= List of places in Bedfordshire =

Map of places in Bedfordshire compiled from this list
See the list of places in England for places in other counties.

Some of the larger settlements of Bedfordshire.

This is a list of all the towns and villages in the county of Bedfordshire. See the List of Bedfordshire settlements by population for a list sorted by population.

== List of places ==
=== A ===
- Aley Green
- Ampthill
- Apsley End
- Arlesey
- Aspley Guise
- Aspley Heath
- Astwick

=== B ===
- Barton-le-Clay
- Battlesden
- Beadlow
- Bedford
- Beeston
- Begwary
- Biddenham
- Bidwell
- Biggleswade
- Billington
- Bletsoe
- Blunham
- Bolnhurst
- Bourne End, Bletsoe
- Bourne End, Cranfield
- Box End
- Brickhill
- Brogborough
- Bromham
- Broom
- Budna

=== C ===
- Caddington
- California
- Campton
- Cardington
- Carlton
- Castle
- Cauldwell
- Chalgrave
- Chalton
- Chaul End
- Church End, Arlesey
- Church End, Totternhoe
- Chawston
- Chellington
- Chicksands
- Chiltern Green
- Clapham
- Clifton
- Clipstone
- Clophill
- Cockayne Hatley
- Colesden
- Colmworth
- Cople
- Cotton End
- Cranfield

=== D ===
- De Parys
- Duck's Cross
- Dunstable
- Dunton
- Denton

=== E ===
- East Hyde
- Eastcotts
- Eaton Bray
- Edworth
- Eggington
- Elstow
- Eversholt
- Everton
- Eyeworth

=== F ===
- Fairfield
- Fancott
- Farndish
- Felmersham
- Flitton
- Flitwick

=== G ===
- Goldington
- Gravenhurst
- Great Barford
- Great Billington
- Great Denham
- Greenfield

=== H ===
- Hall End
- Harlington
- Harpur
- Harrold
- Harrowden
- Hatch
- Haynes
- Haynes Church End
- Haynes West End
- Heath and Reach
- Henlow
- Henlow Camp
- Herrings Green
- Higham Gobion
- Hills End
- Hinwick
- Hockliffe
- Hockwell Ring
- Holme
- Holywell
- Honeydon
- Houghton Conquest
- Houghton Regis
- How End
- Hulcote
- Husborne Crawley
- Hyde

=== I ===
- Ickwell
- Ion
- Ireland

=== K ===
- Keeley Green
- Kempston
- Kempston Central and East
- Kempston Hardwick
- Kempston North
- Kempston Rural
- Kempston South
- Kempston West
- Kensworth
- Kensworth Lynch
- Keysoe
- Keysoe Row
- Kingsbrook
- Knotting
- Knotting Green

=== L ===
- Langford
- Leagrave
- Leedon
- Leighton Buzzard
- Lidlington
- Limbury
- Linslade
- Little Barford
- Little Billington
- Little Staughton
- Lower Caldecote
- Lower Dean
- Lower Gravenhurst
- Lower Shelton
- Lower Stondon
- Lower Sundon
- Lower Woodside
- Luton

=== M ===
- Marston Moretaine
- Maulden
- Melchbourne
- Meppershall
- Millbrook
- Milton Bryan
- Milton Ernest
- Moggerhanger

=== N ===
- New Mill End
- Newnham
- Northill

=== O ===
- Oakley
- Odell
- Old Warden

=== P ===
- Pavenham
- Pegsdon
- Pepperstock
- Pertenhall
- Podington
- Potsgrove
- Potton
- Pulloxhill
- Putnoe

=== Q ===
- Queens Park

=== R ===
- Radwell
- Ravensden
- Renhold
- Ridgmont
- Riseley
- Roxton

=== S ===
- Salford
- Salph End
- Sandy
- Seddington
- Sewell
- Sharnbrook
- Sharpenhoe
- Sheep Lane
- Shefford
- Shelton
- Shillington
- Shortstown
- Silsoe
- Skimpot
- Slip End
- Souldrop
- Southcote
- Southill
- Stagsden
- Stanbridge
- Stanford
- Steppingley
- Stevington
- Stewartby
- Stotfold
- Streatley
- Studham
- Sutton
- Swineshead

=== T ===
- Tebworth
- Tempsford
- The Hyde
- Thorn
- Thorncote Green
- Thurleigh
- Tilsworth
- Tingrith
- Toddington
- Totternhoe
- Turvey

=== U ===
- Upper Caldecote
- Upper Dean
- Upper Gravenhurst
- Upper Shelton
- Upper Staploe
- Upper Stondon
- Upper Sundon

=== W ===
- West End
- Westoning
- Wharley End
- Whipsnade
- Wilden
- Willington
- Wilshamstead
- Wilstead
- Wingfield
- Wixams
- Woburn
- Wood End
- Woodside
- Wootton
- Wootton Green
- Wrestlingworth
- Wyboston
- Wymington

=== Y ===
- Yelden

== Places of interest ==
Key
	Abbey/Priory/Cathedral
Accessible open space	Accessible open space
	Amusement/Theme Park
	Castle
Country Park	Country Park
	English Heritage
	Forestry Commission
Heritage railway	Heritage railway
Historic house	Historic House
Places of Worship	Places of Worship
Museum (free) Museum	Museum (free/not free)
National Trust	National Trust
	Theatre
	Zoo

- Bedford Castle
- Bedford Corn Exchange
- Bedford Park
- Cardington (R101 hangar)
- Chiltern Hills
- De Grey Mausoleum
- Dunstable Downs
- Elstow Moot Hall
- The Higgins Art Gallery & Museum
- Houghton House
- Leighton Buzzard Light Railway
- Luton Hoo
- Luton Museum & Art Gallery
- Marston Vale Community Forest
- Mossman Collection
- Priory Country Park
- RAF Henlow
- RSPB The Lodge, Sandy
- Someries castle
- The Shuttleworth Collection
- Stockwood Craft Museum
- Wardown Park
- Waulud's Bank
- Whipsnade Wildlife Park
- Whipsnade Tree Cathedral
- Willington Dovecote & Stables
- Woburn Abbey
- Woburn Safari Park
- Woodside Farm and Wildfowl Park
- Wrest Park Gardens
