= Wood End, Bedfordshire =

Village in Bedfordshire, England

Coordinates: 52.1103°N 0.54056°W

Wood End
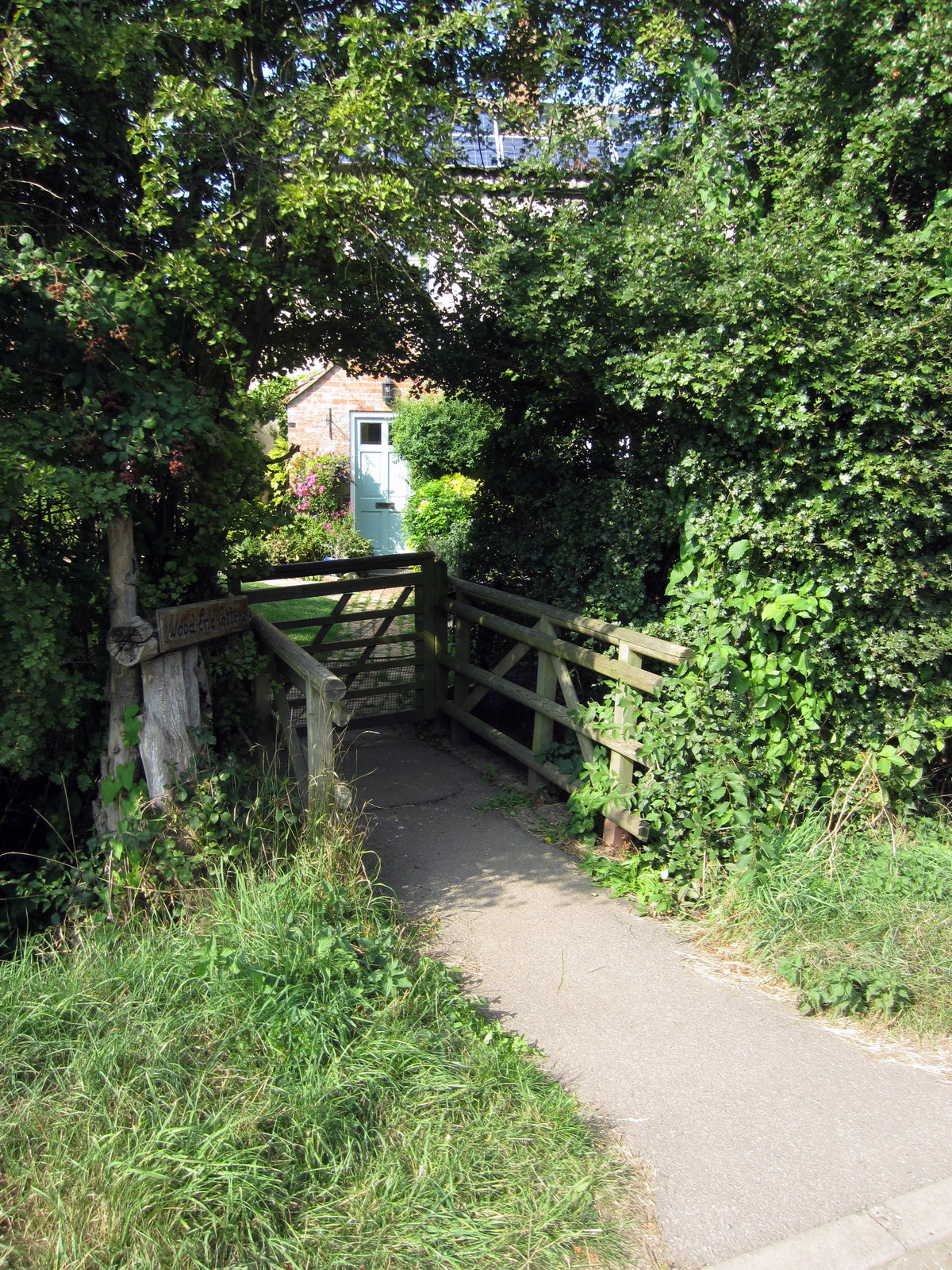
- Wood End Cottage

- Location within Bedfordshire
- OS grid reference: TL000467
- Civil parish: Kempston Rural
- Unitary authority: Bedford
- Ceremonial county: Bedfordshire
- Region: East
- Country: England
- Sovereign state: United Kingdom
- Post town: BEDFORD
- Postcode district: MK43
- Dialling code: 01234
- Police: Bedfordshire
- Fire: Bedfordshire
- Ambulance: East of England
- UK Parliament: Mid Bedfordshire

Wood End (or Kempston Wood End) is a small village located in the Borough of Bedford in Bedfordshire England.

The settlement was historically one of the hamlets (or "Ends") of Kempston. Today, Wood End forms part of Kempston Rural, and is the southernmost settlement within the parish. Wood End is also close to Keeley Green, and Wootton.
