= Bedford Rural District =

Former local government area in Bedfordshire, England

Coordinates: 52.136°N 0.469°W

- Rural district
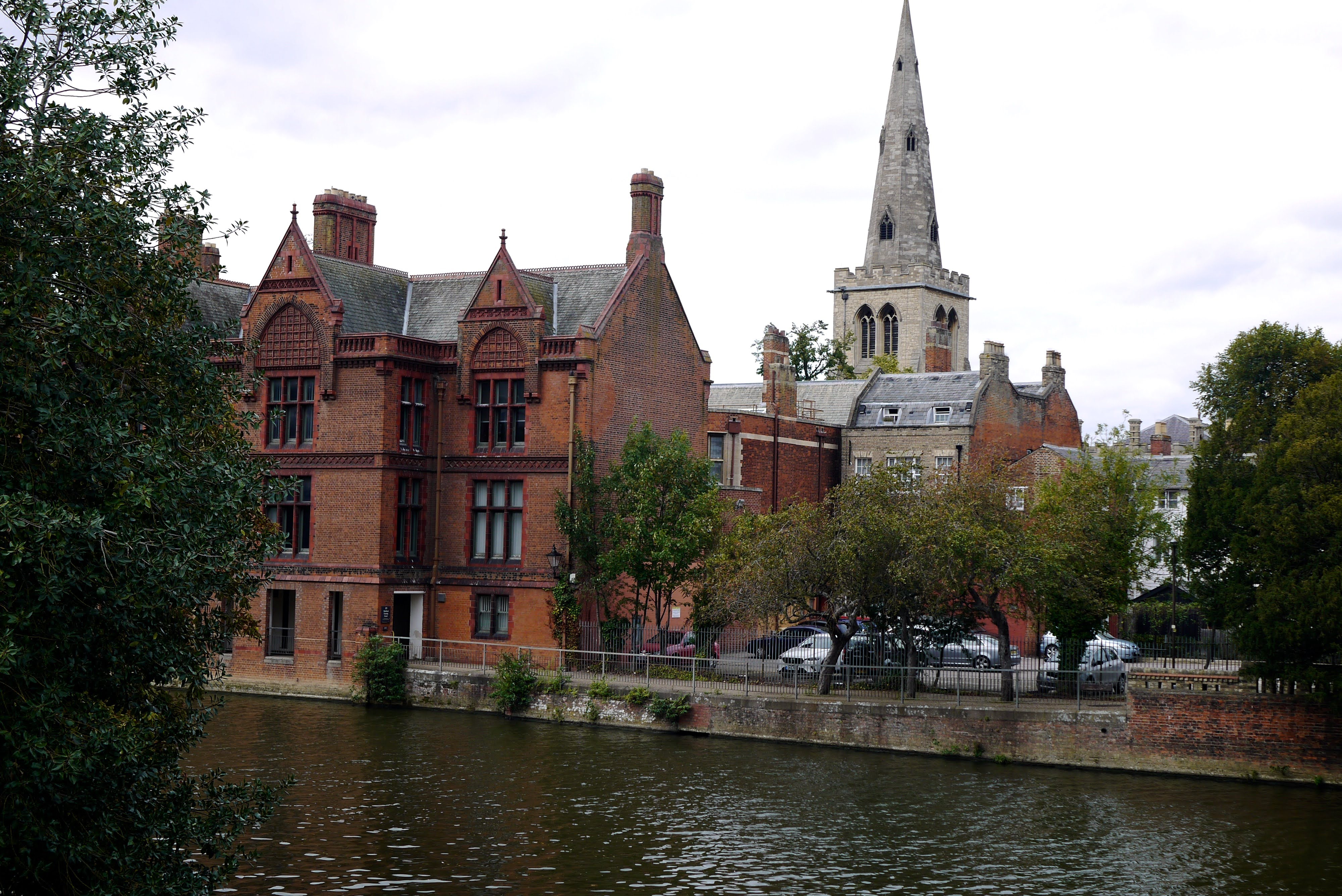
- Population
  - 1901: 18,851
  - 1971: 36,700
- History
  - Created: 28 December 1894
  - Abolished: 31 March 1974
  - Succeeded by: Bedford Borough
  - HQ: Bedford
- Contained within
  - County Council: Bedfordshire
- Map of boundary as of 1971

Bedford Rural District was a rural district in Bedfordshire, England from 1894 to 1974. It surrounded but did not include the Municipal Borough of Bedford and Kempston Urban District.

== Evolution ==
The district had its origins in the Bedford Rural Sanitary District. This had been created under the Public Health Acts of 1872 and 1875, giving public health and local government responsibilities for rural areas to the existing Boards of Guardians of Poor Law Unions.

Under the Local Government Act 1894, Rural Sanitary Districts became Rural Districts from 28 December 1894. Where Rural Sanitary Districts straddled county boundaries, they were to be split or otherwise adjusted so that each new Rural District was in one county. Whilst the Bedford Rural Sanitary District was entirely in Bedfordshire, the neighbouring Wellingborough Rural Sanitary District straddled Northamptonshire and Bedfordshire as it included two small Bedfordshire parishes at Podington and Wymington. An order was made prior to the new councils coming into force directing that Podington and Wymington should join the Bedford Rural District.

The link with the Poor Law Union continued, with all the elected councillors of the Rural District Council being ex officio members of the Board of Guardians for Bedford (or Wellingborough for those two parishes). The first meeting of the new council was held on 5 January 1895 in the board room of the Bedford Union Workhouse. The council's first chairman, Major William Francis Higgins, had been the chairman of the previous Bedford Board of Guardians.

Kempston was initially included within Bedford Rural District, but work began almost immediately to create an urban district council for the more built-up part of the parish. In June 1895 Bedfordshire County Council decided that the parish of Kempston should be split between a Kempston Urban District and a new parish called Kempston Rural which was to stay in the Bedford Rural District. These changes came into force on 1 April 1896.

Bedford Rural District was enlarged in 1934 when it took in the territory of the disbanded Eaton Socon Rural District.

== Parishes ==
Bedford Rural District contained the following civil parishes.

Parish	From	To	Notes
Biddenham	28 Dec 1894	31 Mar 1974	
Bletsoe	28 Dec 1894	31 Mar 1974	
Bolnhurst	28 Dec 1894	31 Mar 1934	Abolished to become part of Bolnhurst and Keysoe.
Bolnhurst and Keysoe	1 Apr 1934	31 Mar 1974	Created on abolition of separate parishes of Keysoe and Bolnhurst.
Bromham	28 Dec 1894	31 Mar 1974	
Cardington	28 Dec 1894	31 Mar 1974	
Carlton	28 Dec 1894	31 Mar 1934	Abolished to become part of Carlton and Chellington.
Carlton and Chellington	1 Apr 1934	31 Mar 1974	Created on abolition of separate parishes of Chellington and Carlton.
Chellington	28 Dec 1894	31 Mar 1934	Abolished to become part of Carlton and Chellington.
Clapham	28 Dec 1894	31 Mar 1974	
Colmworth	28 Dec 1894	31 Mar 1974	
Colworth Farm	28 Dec 1894	31 Mar 1895	Former extra-parochial area, deemed to be a civil parish after 1858. Covered a single farm near Colworth House, west of Sharnbrook. Abolished to become part of Sharnbrook.
Cople	28 Dec 1894	31 Mar 1974	
Dean and Shelton	1 Apr 1934	31 Mar 1974	Created on abolition of separate parishes of Shelton and Dean, and transferred to Bedford Rural District from abolished Eaton Socon Rural District on same day.
Eastcotts	28 Dec 1894	31 Mar 1974	
Eaton Socon	1 Apr 1934	31 Mar 1965	Transferred to Bedford Rural District on abolition of Eaton Socon Rural District. Parish abolished 1965, with its former area being split between St Neots Urban District in the county of Huntingdon and Peterborough and a new parish called Staploe covering the rural parts of the parish, which stayed in Bedford Rural District.
Elstow	28 Dec 1894	31 Mar 1974	
Felmersham	28 Dec 1894	31 Mar 1974	
Goldington	28 Dec 1894	31 Mar 1934	Parish abolished 1934, with most of the area and population added to Bedford Municipal Borough, and smaller areas added to Ravensden and Renhold.
Great Barford	28 Dec 1894	31 Mar 1974	
Harrold	28 Dec 1894	31 Mar 1974	
Kempston	28 Dec 1894	31 Mar 1896	Parish divided into two parishes called Kempston Urban and Kempston Rural, with Kempston Urban becoming an urban district independent of Bedford Rural District.
Kempston Rural	1 Apr 1896	31 Mar 1974	Parish created from that part of old Kempston parish excluded from Kempston Urban District.
Keysoe	28 Dec 1894	31 Mar 1934	Abolished to become part of Bolnhurst and Keysoe parish.
Knotting	28 Dec 1894	31 Mar 1934	Abolished to become part of Knotting and Souldrop parish.
Knotting and Souldrop	1 Apr 1934	31 Mar 1974	Created on abolition of separate parishes of Souldrop and Knotting.
Little Barford	1 Apr 1934	31 Mar 1974	Transferred to Bedford Rural District on abolition of Eaton Socon Rural District.
Little Staughton	1 Apr 1934	31 Mar 1974	Transferred to Bedford Rural District on abolition of Eaton Socon Rural District.
Melchbourne	28 Dec 1894	31 Mar 1934	Abolished to become part of Melchbourne and Yielden.
Melchbourne and Yielden	1 Apr 1934	31 Mar 1974	Created on abolition of separate parishes of Yelden (or Yielden) and Melchbourne.
Milton Ernest	28 Dec 1894	31 Mar 1974	
Oakley	28 Dec 1894	31 Mar 1974	
Odell	28 Dec 1894	31 Mar 1974	
Pavenham	28 Dec 1894	31 Mar 1974	
Pertenhall	1 Apr 1934	31 Mar 1974	Transferred to Bedford Rural District on abolition of Eaton Socon Rural District.
Podington	28 Dec 1894	31 Mar 1974	
Ravensden	28 Dec 1894	31 Mar 1974	
Renhold	28 Dec 1894	31 Mar 1974	
Riseley	28 Dec 1894	31 Mar 1974	
Roxton	28 Dec 1894	31 Mar 1974	
Sharnbrook	28 Dec 1894	31 Mar 1974	
Souldrop	28 Dec 1894	31 Mar 1934	Abolished to become part of Knotting and Souldrop.
Stagsden	28 Dec 1894	31 Mar 1974	
Staploe	1 Apr 1965	31 Mar 1974	Created from that part of Eaton Socon parish which was not transferred to St Neots Urban District.
Stevington	28 Dec 1894	31 Mar 1974	
Stewartby	1 Oct 1937	31 Mar 1974	Created from parts of Wootton and Kempston Rural.
Swineshead	1 Apr 1934	31 Mar 1974	Transferred to Bedford Rural District on abolition of Eaton Socon Rural District.
Thurleigh	28 Dec 1894	31 Mar 1974	
Turvey	28 Dec 1894	31 Mar 1974	
Wilden	28 Dec 1894	31 Mar 1974	
Willington	28 Dec 1894	31 Mar 1974	
Wilshamstead	28 Dec 1894	31 Mar 1974	
Wootton	28 Dec 1894	31 Mar 1974	
Wymington	28 Dec 1894	31 Mar 1974	
Yelden	28 Dec 1894	31 Mar 1934	Abolished to become part of Melchbourne and Yielden.

== Premises ==
From its formation until the 1920s the council generally met at the Bedford Union Workhouse. By 1929 the council was meeting at the Town Hall in Bedford. Administrative offices were nearby at 6A St Mary's Street. In 1958 the council moved to a pair of large Victorian houses at 41-43 Goldington Road in Bedford, and gradually acquired adjoining properties. By the time of the council's abolition in 1974 it occupied numbers 37-45 (odds) Goldington Road.

== Abolition ==
In 1974, under the Local Government Act 1972, it was merged with Bedford borough and Kempston Urban District to form the new Bedford district. The old council's former offices on Goldington Road continued to be used as offices by the new authority for several years.
