= Kempston West =

Area of Kempston, Bedfordshire, England

Coordinates: 52.11°N 0.51°W

- Location within Bedfordshire
- Population: 4,361 (2011 Census. Ward)
- Civil parish: Kempston
- Unitary authority: Bedfordl
- Ceremonial county: Bedfordshire
- Region: East
- Country: England
- Sovereign state: United Kingdom
- Post town: BEDFORD
- Postcode district: MK42
- Dialling code: 01234
- Police: Bedfordshire
- Fire: Bedfordshire
- Ambulance: East of England
- UK Parliament: Bedford

Kempston West is an electoral ward and area within the town of Kempston, Bedfordshire, England.

The boundaries of Kempston West are approximately the River Great Ouse to the north, Woburn Road to the south and east and Kempston Rural to the west.

The ward was created in 2011 and was first contested in the 2011 local elections. Today, Kempston Academy and the headquarters of Bedfordshire Police are located within the boundaries of Kempston West.
