= Biddenham International School and Sports College =

Location
- Biddenham Turn; Biddenham, Bedfordshire, MK40 4AZ; England; 52°08′12″N 0°29′49″W

Information
- Type: Foundation school
- Established: 1979
- Local authority: Bedford
- Department for Education URN: 109690 Tables
- Ofsted: Reports
- Headteacher: David Bailey
- Gender: Mixed
- Age: 11 to 18
- Enrolment: 880 as of January 2016
- Website: http://www.biddenham.beds.sch.uk/

Biddenham International School and Sports College (formerly John Howard Upper School) is a mixed secondary school and sixth form located in Biddenham in the English county of Bedfordshire.

The school serves the Brickhill, Harpur and Queens Park areas of Bedford as well as the villages of Biddenham and Great Denham. The school holds Specialist Sports College status.

== History ==
It was established in 1979 as John Howard Upper School (for pupils ages 13 to 18). The headmaster for the entire time the school was as John Howard Upper School was Roy Grace. In 1988 the school was merged with Pilgrim Upper to form Biddenham Upper School on the John Howard site. Garry Fitzhugh took over as head when the merger was complete.

In October 2008 Biddenham Upper School was awarded International School status by the British Council. The award was made in recognition of Biddenham's international ethos and its links with schools abroad. Following this, the school planned to offer the International Baccalaureate to its sixth form students as an alternative to A level courses from September 2010, however a lack of interest amongst students has led to the baccalaureate being withdrawn at the school.

In January 2010, Bedford Borough Council confirmed its intention to move St John’s School in Kempston in the next few years to a new campus on the site of Biddenham Upper School. However since 1 September 2011, St John’s School has gained academy status and the plans for the move are on hold.

In September 2015 the school began admitting 11 year old pupils. The change meant that Biddenham converted from being an upper school to full-age range secondary school, with pupils aged 11 to 18.

== Notable former pupils ==
- Etienne Stott, slalom canoeist
- Sam Oldham, gymnast
