= Box End =

Village in Bedfordshire, England

Coordinates: 52.12°N 00.54°W

- Location within Bedfordshire
- OS grid reference: TL0048
- Civil parish: Kempston Rural
- Unitary authority: Bedford
- Ceremonial county: Bedfordshire
- Region: East
- Country: England
- Sovereign state: United Kingdom
- Post town: BEDFORD
- Postcode district: MK43
- Dialling code: 01234
- Police: Bedfordshire
- Fire: Bedfordshire
- Ambulance: East of England
- UK Parliament: Mid Bedfordshire

Box End (or Kempston Box End) is a village in the Borough of Bedford in Bedfordshire, England. It is in the civil parish of Kempston Rural.

The settlement was one of the hamlets (or "Ends") of Kempston. Today, Box End forms part of the Kempston Rural civil parish.

Box End has a watersports and activity leisure centre. The village pub, the Slaters Arms, began as a beerhouse with the first reference to it being one of six cottages settled on Thomas Mitchell and his wife Sarah Ann in 1853. It closed in December 2013.

Box End House has been a Grade II* listed building since 1977. It is a late-16th-century timber-framed house, probably built in an original H-plan layout. The right-hand cross wing was removed, and a gable end was built up with stone rubble. In 1847 a new principal range was built, parallel with the original, facing south. In 1977 an early 17th-century wall painting was uncovered in a first floor room showing bull-baiting and was the catalyst for listing the entire building.

== Notable resident ==
- Paula Vennells, the former Post Office Limited CEO, lives here in a Grade II listed property.
