= BFRS =

BFRS may refer to two fire and rescue services in England:

- Bedfordshire Fire and Rescue Service
- Buckinghamshire Fire and Rescue Service
