= Keeley Green =

Area of Wootton in Bedfordshire, England

Coordinates: 52.10397°N 0.52855°W

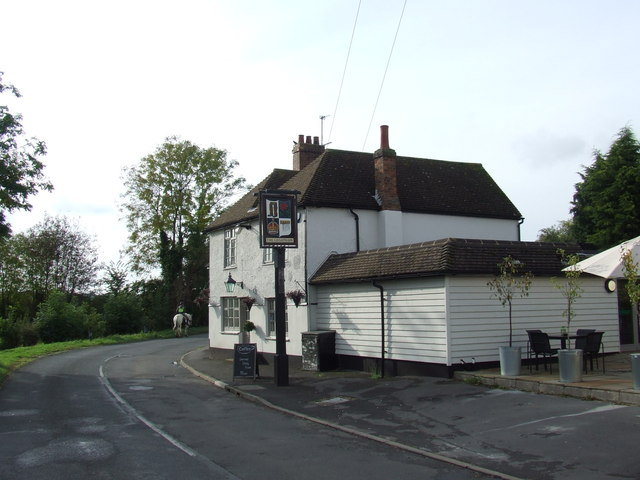
- The Legstraps at the end of Keeley Lane

- Location within Bedfordshire
- OS grid reference: TL008460
- Civil parish: Wootton
- Unitary authority: Bedford
- Ceremonial county: Bedfordshire
- Region: East
- Country: England
- Sovereign state: United Kingdom
- Post town: BEDFORD
- Postcode district: MK43
- Dialling code: 01234
- Police: Bedfordshire
- Fire: Bedfordshire
- Ambulance: East of England
- UK Parliament: Mid Bedfordshire

Keeley Green is an area of the village of Wootton in the Borough of Bedford in Bedfordshire, England. It borders the parish of Kempston Rural. Keeley Green was historically a medieval settlement and there was once a village green, now "built over and/or subsumed into the agricultural land and gardens". Records of The Rose and Crown public house on Keeley Lane go back to 1820. The pub was refurbished in 2012 and renamed The Legstraps. Also on Keeley Lane are a number of 17th and 18th century timber-framed, Grade II listed dwellings. On Bedford Road stand Keeley Grange, a 17th century timber-framed farmhouse and Pear Tree Cottage, both Grade II listed, plus the wildlife haven of Keeley End Pond. Historical Environment Records place a moated site and earthworks at Keeley Farm. An Ordnance Survey map of 1901 shows a brickworks close to the hamlet.
