= West End, Bedfordshire =

Hamlet in Bedfordshire, England

Coordinates: 52.15961°N 0.5603°W

West End
- Location within Bedfordshire
- OS grid reference: SP985522
- Civil parish: Stevington
- District: Bedford
- Unitary authority: Bedford Borough Council
- Ceremonial county: Bedfordshire
- Region: East
- Country: England
- Sovereign state: United Kingdom
- Post town: BEDFORD
- Postcode district: MK43
- Dialling code: 01234
- Police: Bedfordshire
- Fire: Bedfordshire
- Ambulance: East of England
- UK Parliament: North East Bedfordshire

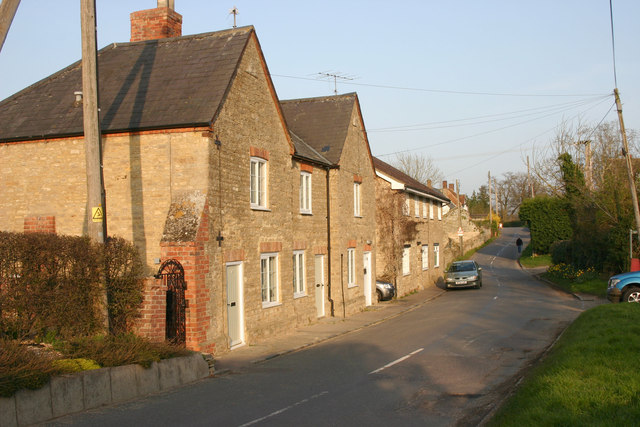
Cottages at West End, Stevington

West End is a hamlet in the civil parish of Stevington, in the Borough of Bedford in Bedfordshire, England.

The settlement is close to Carlton, Pavenham and Stevington. West End also forms part of the wider Stevington civil parish.
