= Queens Park, Bedford =

Area of Bedford, England

Coordinates: 52.13462°N 0.48934°W

Queens Park
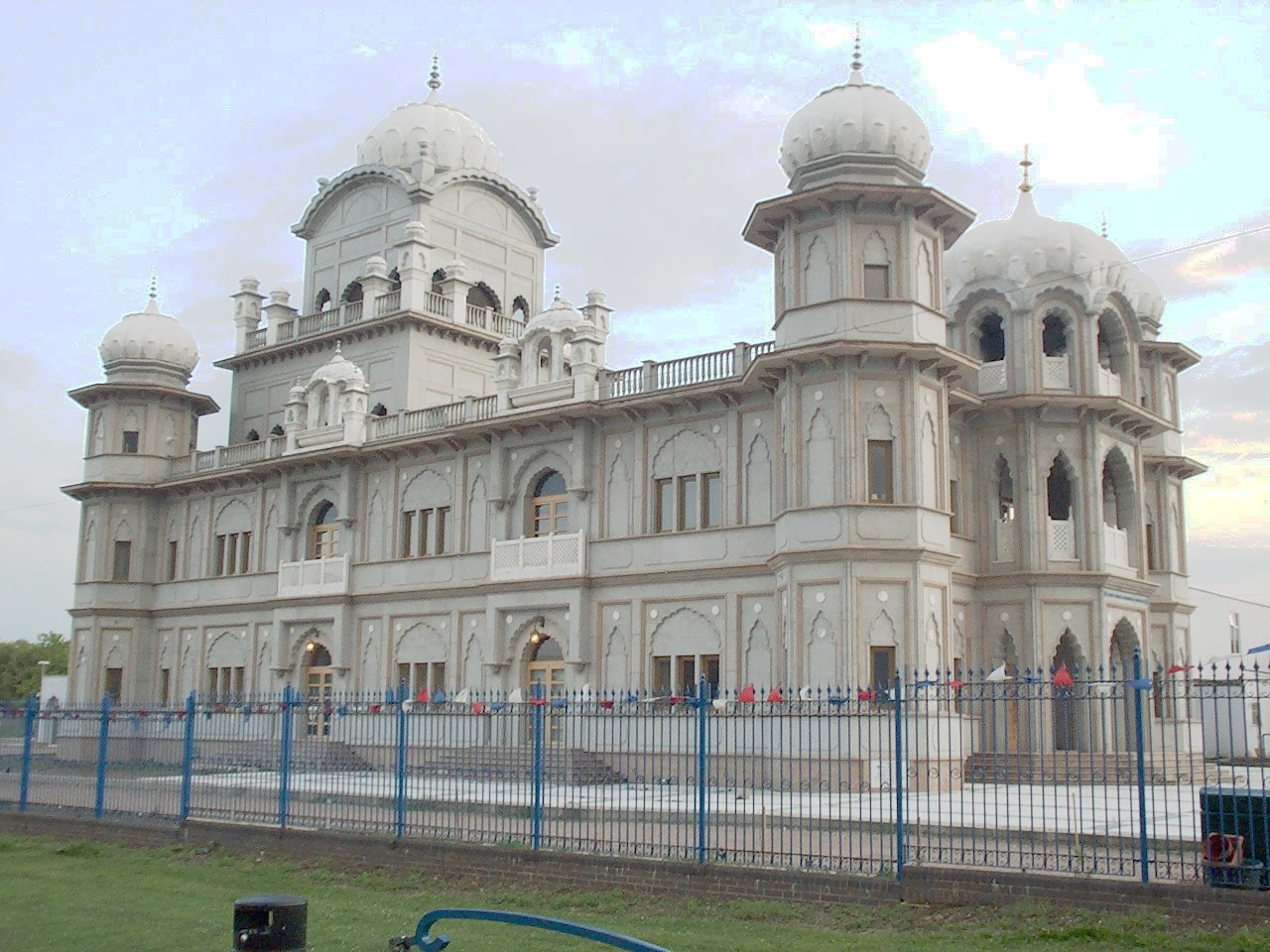
- Guru Nanak Gurdwara in Queens Park

- Location within Bedfordshire
- Population: 9,800 (2021 Census. Ward)
- OS grid reference: TL034495
- Unitary authority: Bedford
- Ceremonial county: Bedfordshire
- Region: East
- Country: England
- Sovereign state: United Kingdom
- Post town: BEDFORD
- Postcode district: MK40
- Dialling code: 01234
- Police: Bedfordshire
- Fire: Bedfordshire
- Ambulance: East of England
- UK Parliament: Bedford

Queens Park is an electoral ward and area of Bedford, England, west of the town centre. The community was established in the 1890s and has been described as Bedford's first industrial suburb. Nowadays, it is diverse and multicultural with many specialist shops and businesses including international supermarkets and delis. Places of worship include an Anglican church, two mosques and one of the largest Sikh temples in the United Kingdom.

== History ==
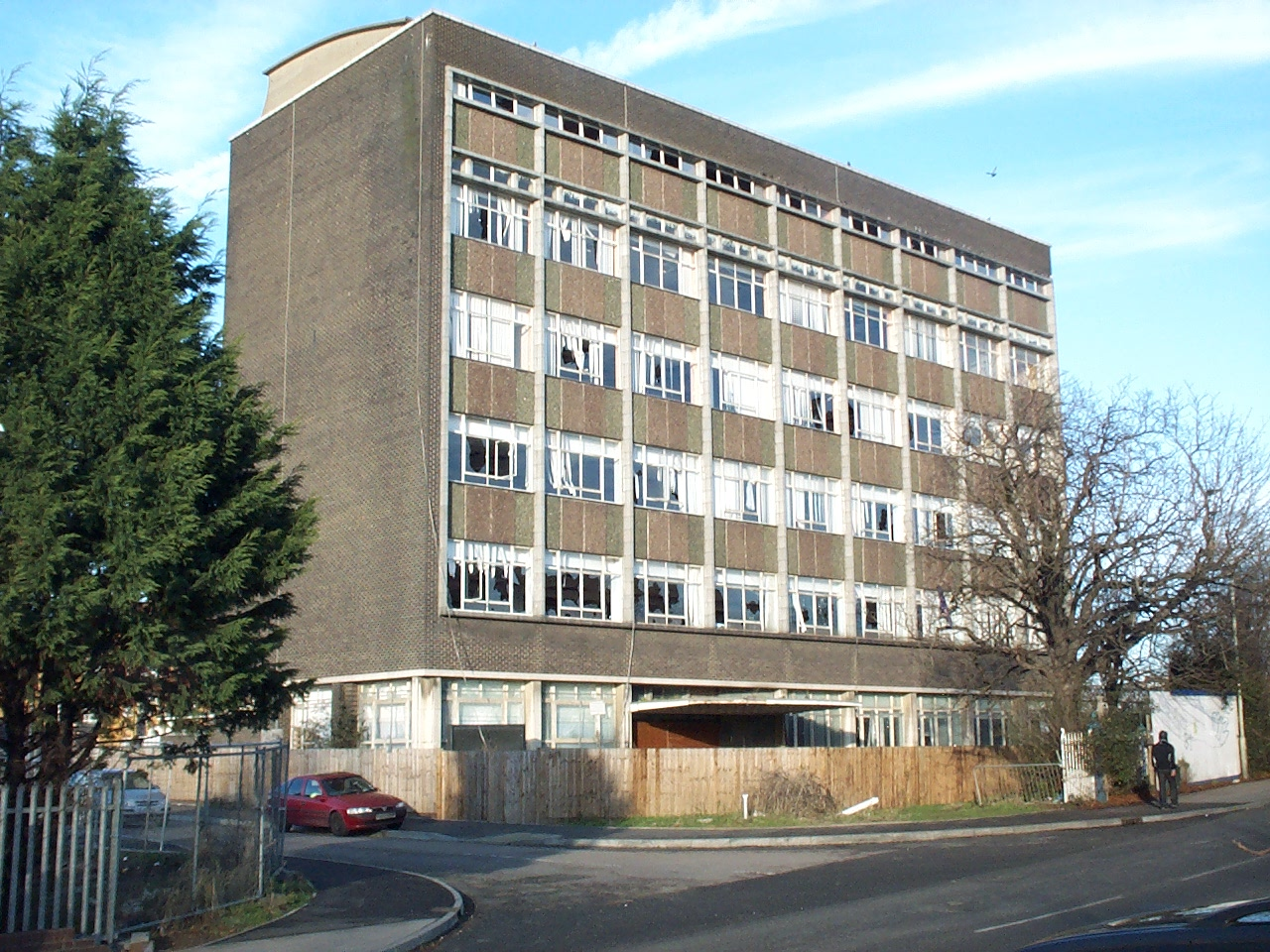
The Allens Tower (demolished 2009), offices for W H Allen Sons and Company opened by Prince Philip, Duke of Edinburgh in 1959.

The land in Queens Park was farmed as early as the 11th century, and occupied by tenant farmers. The only evidence of primitive settlements is the discovery of flint at Honey Hills. Early settlements and dwellings included; Provendor Farm, Prebend Farm, and the Farm House & cottages at Bedford Ford End (until the 1950s) now Fernleigh Close. Gallows existed up to 1802 at the sharp bend on the Bromham Road.

One of the earliest developments west of the Midland Main Line was the building of a gasworks off Ford End Road in 1864. The works expanded in the first half of the twentieth century and three gas holders formed a prominent visual feature of the area. The earliest was likely Edwardian but significantly altered by 1960; the other two were constructed in 1926 and 1938. Much of the site was cleared after the conversion from town gas to North Sea natural gas in the 1970s. The gas holders continued in use into the 2000s but became redundant and were demolished in 2018.

In 1887 advertisements appeared in the Bedfordshire Times and Independent for auctions of plots of land for the Queen's Park Building Estate, so named to mark the Golden Jubilee of Queen Victoria. In 1890 William Henry Allen bought twenty acres immediately west of the Midland Main Line to relocate his business, W H Allen, Son and Company from Lambeth in London. Four years later the company opened the "Queen's Engineering Works". Over the years, the company manufactured centrifugal pumps, steam and diesel engines, industrial fans and gas turbines. Equipment was installed in pumping stations, sewage works, power stations and used in marine applications; much was exported. Around 2,500 persons were employed at the works in the 1950s. The works closed in 2000, after one hundred and six years in operation.

John Parish White established the "Pyghtle Works" in 1896 on land bought from and adjoining W H Allen. The business initially made architectural joinery, but soon diversified into making furniture designed by among others Baillie Scott and C. F. A. Voysey, as well as garden furniture to the designs of C. H. B. Quennell. The works closed in 1960 and the land reverted to W H Allen.

Queens Park was home to Bedford Town Football Club from 1911 to 1982 with the exception of the First World War years. The ground came to be known as "The Eyrie" owing to the club's nickname of "The Eagles". Greyhound racing took place at the stadium from the late 1960s until the ground's closure. The stadium was demolished in 1983 and the site taken over by freeholder, Charles Wells Ltd, for the Eagle Brewery. After Bedford Town FC was reformed in the early 1990s home matches were for a brief spell played on a public park pitch in the area.

== Demography ==
Queens Park has hosted many communities migrating to the Bedford area over the 20th century, firstly Irish and Italian families, followed by Asians, Africans, and most recently, people from Eastern Europe.

== Governance ==
Queens Park is an unparished area, with all community services under the direct control of Bedford Borough Council. Queens Park elects three councillors to Bedford Borough Council. In the election held on 4 May 2023, all three councillors elected represented the Labour Party. The ward boundaries are Biddenham to the north, the River Great Ouse to the south, the Midland Main Line railway line to the east, and Great Denham and Bedford Golf Club to the west.

== Economy ==
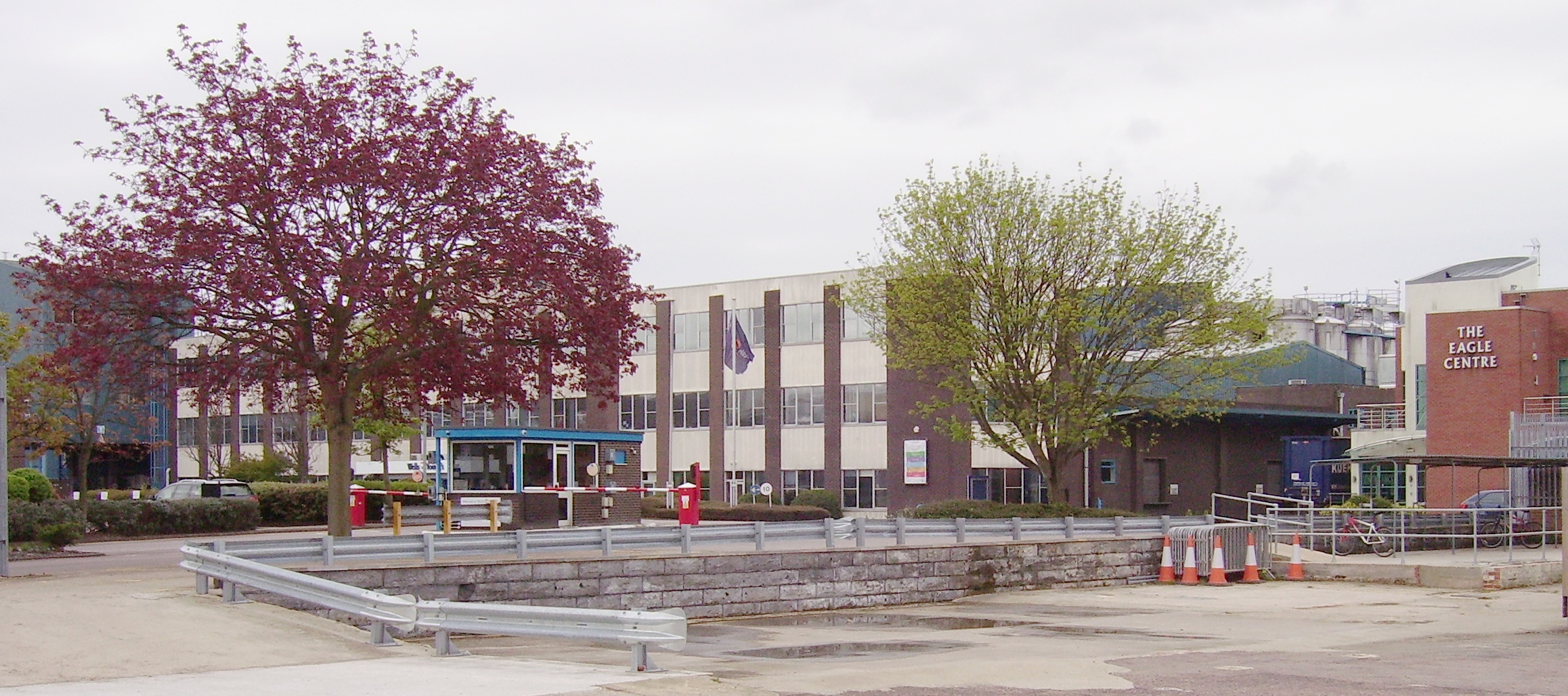
Eagle Brewery

Ford End Road acts as the "high street" for the area, and includes independent supermarkets, deli's, takeaway restaurants, and a Tesco Express store. Further shops and businesses are located on Iddesleigh Road, including convenience stores and Queens Park post office. Today, Queens Park is an established area of Bedford.

The 'Eagle Brewery' on Havelock Street was established by Charles Wells Ltd and opened by Prince Richard, Duke of Gloucester on 18 May 1976. Marston's acquired the brewery in May 2017. In November 2022, it was announced that the brewery would be sold to Spanish-based brewer S A Damm. All 67 employees would be retained.

== Education ==
There are three primary schools in Queens Park - Queens Park Academy which is situated over two sites on Chestnut Avenue and Marlborough Road, Westfield School on Chester Road, and St Joseph's and St Gregory's Roman Catholic Middle School which is also on Chester Road. For older children the area is in the catchment for Biddenham International School which is located just to the north of Queens Park.

Enterprise House (located on Old Ford End Road) is a small adult education centre operated by Bedford College. The centre offers a range of part-time courses for the Queens Park community, covering a range of subjects from child care and computing to English language skills and maths.

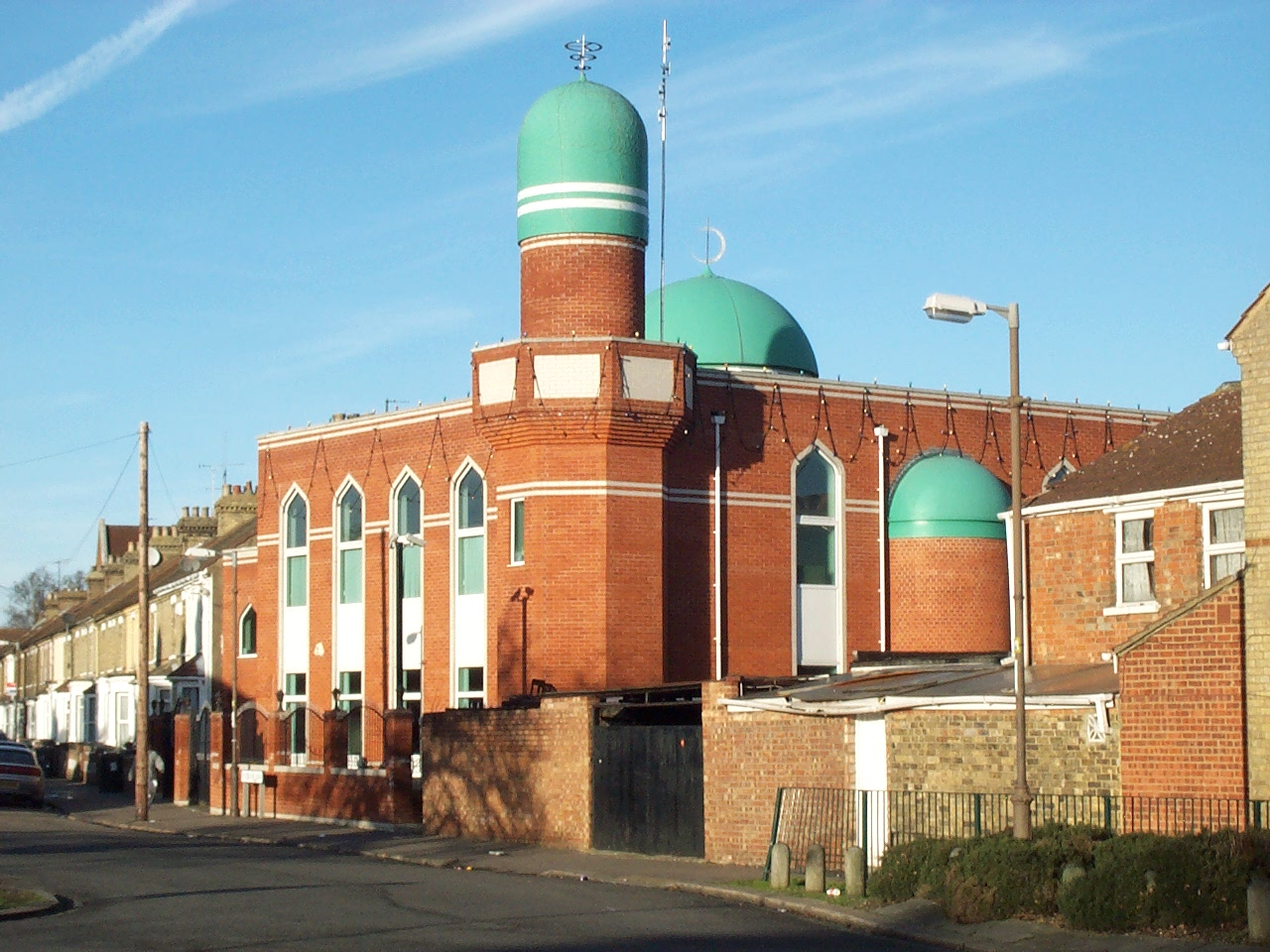
Jamia Masjid Gulshani Baghdad Mosque in Queens Park

== Religious sites ==
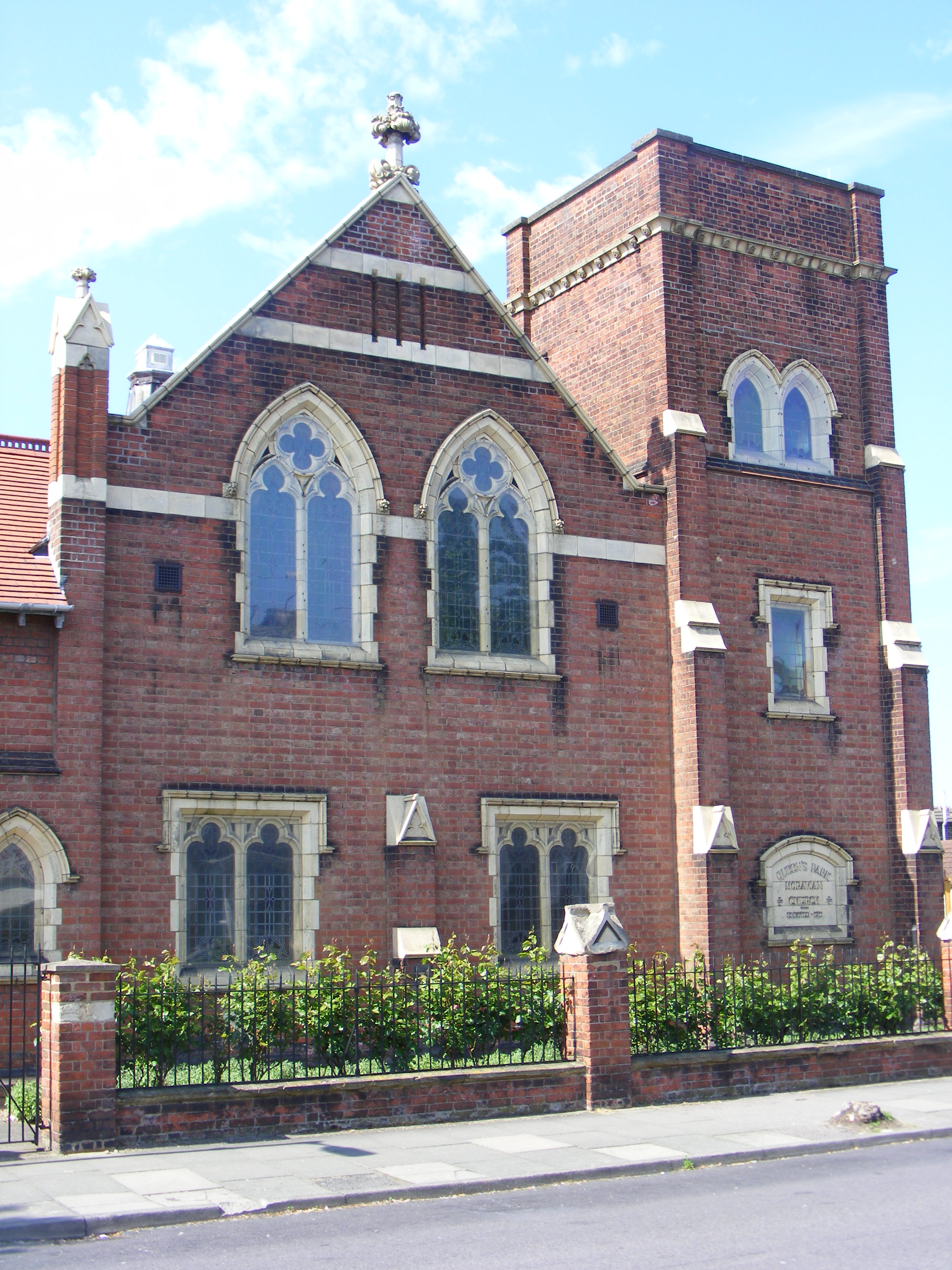
The Moravian Church, Howard Avenue

- All Saints Church (Church of England), located on Iddesleigh Road
- A hall on Howard Avenue was opened for worship by the Moravian Church in 1895. The adjoining church building was added in 1911
- Serbian Orthodox Church services are also held at Bedford Moravian Church
- The Jamia Masjid Gulshani Baghdad Mosque, located on Westbourne Road opened in 2001
- The Jamia Masjid Hanfia Ghousia Mosque located on Ford End Road
- The Guru Nanak Gurdwara (Sikh Temple), also on Ford End Road opened in April 2007

== Community facilities ==
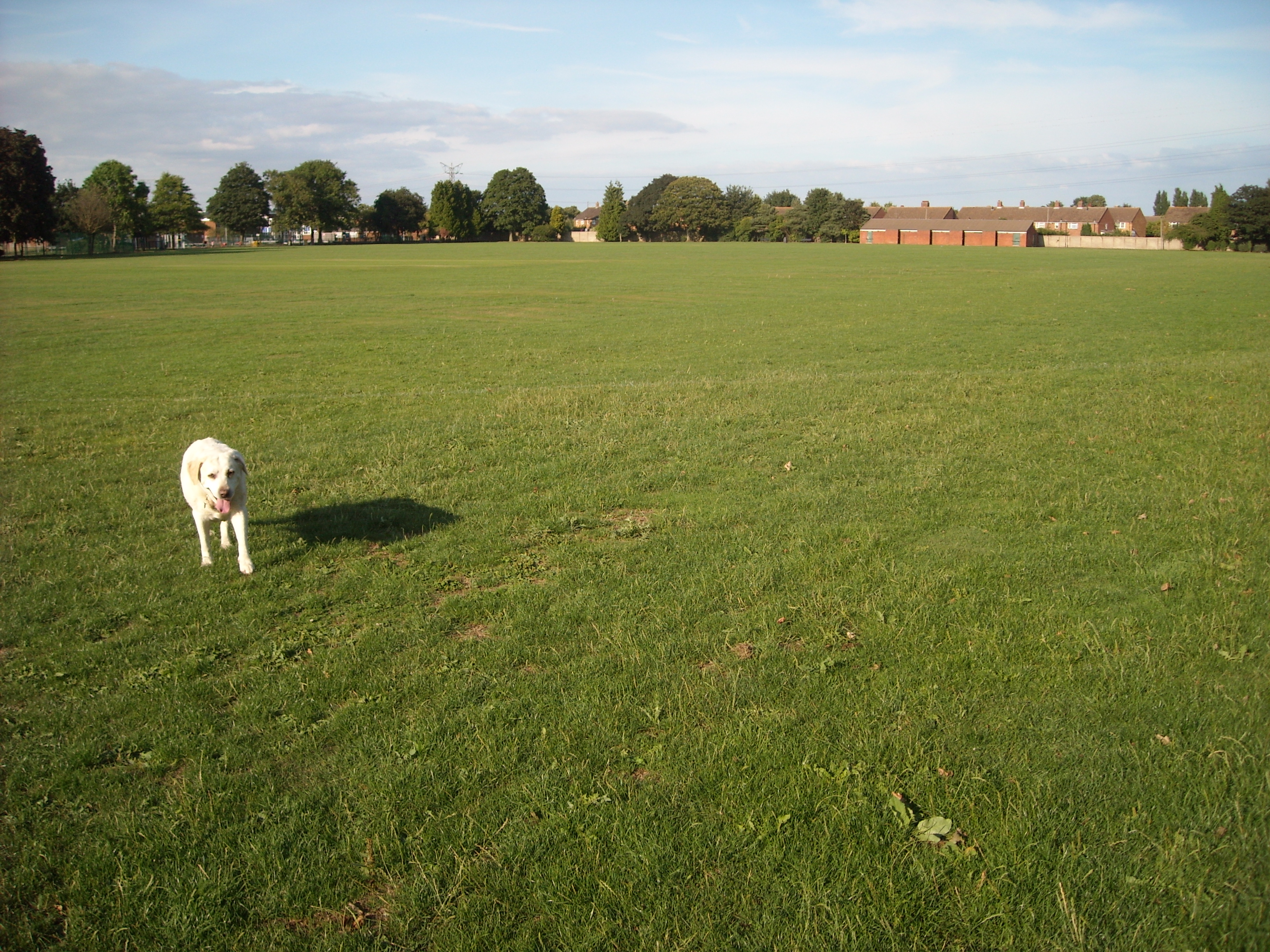
Allen Park Recreation Ground

The main open space in Queens Park is located along the riverside as well as the Allen Park Recreation Ground. There is also a provision of allotments located on the western edge of the area. Queens Park Community Centre is situated on Marlborough Road.

== Transport links ==
Vehicular access to Queens Park from Bedford town centre is across the nineteen-span Ford End Road railway bridge, constructed in 1894. The bridge has only a single path for pedestrians but a separate footbridge of metallic construction was erected alongside in 1972. One of the spans of the road bridge was reconstructed in 2018 to accommodate overhead wires for the electrification of the Midland Main Line. A planning document described the road bridge as "narrow and unpleasant" and criticised the footbridge as "narrow and boxing in pedestrians". The report suggested the construction of a new road bridge while retaining the existing bridge for pedestrians and cyclists.

Queens Park is served by bus route no.8 Bedford bus station – Great Denham. The roadway is restricted to buses and cyclists at the point Old Ford End Road meets Greenkeepers Road with access controlled by retractable bollards.
