= Kempston Central and East =

Area of Kempston, Bedfordshire, England

Coordinates: 52.11888°N 0.48784°W

- Location within Bedfordshire
- Population: 7,136 (2011 Census. Ward)
- OS grid reference: TL036478
- Civil parish: Kempston
- Unitary authority: Bedford
- Ceremonial county: Bedfordshire
- Region: East
- Country: England
- Sovereign state: United Kingdom
- Post town: BEDFORD
- Postcode district: MK42
- Dialling code: 01234
- Police: Bedfordshire
- Fire: Bedfordshire
- Ambulance: East of England
- UK Parliament: Bedford

Kempston Central and East is an electoral ward and area within Kempston, Bedfordshire, England.

The boundaries of the ward are approximately the River Great Ouse to the north, the Midland Main Line railway line to the east, Elstow Road to south and Bedford Road to the west.

The area used to be a hamlet known as Kempston East End, but was absorbed into the Kempston Urban District in 1896. Today, Kempston Barracks and the Saxon shopping centre (including a Sainsbury's supermarket) are located within the boundaries of the ward.

Previously known as Kempston East, the ward's name was changed for the 5 May 2011 local elections and it became Kempston Central and East.
