= Kempston Academy =

Secondary school and sixth form in Bedfordshire

Location
- Hill Rise; Kempston, Bedfordshire, MK42 7EB; England
- 52°06′36″N 0°30′33″W

Information
- Type: Academy
- Local authority: Bedford
- Trust: Chiltern Learning Trust
- Department for Education URN: 142387 Tables
- Ofsted: Reports
- Headteacher: Paul House
- Gender: Mixed
- Age: 11 to 16
- Colours: Red, grey and black
- Website: https://www.kempstonacademy.co.uk/

Kempston Academy is a mixed secondary school and sixth form located on Hill Rise in Kempston, Bedfordshire, England. The school forms part of an educational campus which also includes a Child Development Centre and Ridgeway School.

== History ==
The school was originally named Hastingsbury Upper School and Community College, and later became a Business and Enterprise College. It was previously an upper school, teaching children from the age of 13 to 18. It was also a foundation school administered by Bedford Borough Council. Hastingsbury converted to academy status November 2015 and is now sponsored by the Challenger multi-academy trust. The school was later renamed Kempston Challenger Academy. The school extended its lower age range in 2017 and is now a secondary school. In May 2022 the school was transferred to the Chiltern Learning Trust. The school is now known as Kempston Academy.

== Academics ==
Kempston Academy offers GCSEs and BTECs as programmes of study. Pupils in the sixth form can no longer choose to study from a range of A Levels and BTECs after GCSE.
