= Kempston gravel pit railway =

UK railway line

Coordinates: 52.12°N 0.50°W

Kempston gravel pit railway was a narrow-gauge tramway which connected a gravel pit in the Hill Grounds area of Kempston, Bedfordshire to Bedford Road. There are a small number of records of its operation in the late 1910s and 1920s and perhaps some years early. The terminus lay by the entrance to the Robert Bruce School site on what is now Bedford Road.

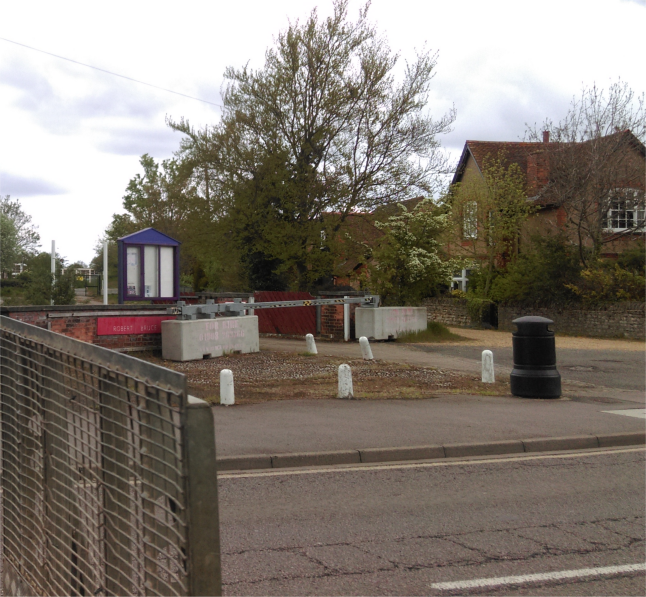
The entrance to the Robert Bruce School site, as it appeared in April 2019. The southern terminus of the Kempston gravel railway is likely to have been to the left of the row of trees.

The gravel pit lay on the banks of the River Great Ouse. The tramway is shown on sheet 84 of the Ordnance Survey Popular Edition Map, which was surveyed between 1912 and 1923 and first published in 1919. According to this map, the track was about 750 metres (2,460 ft) long and ended in the area where Mahew Court now stands on Emmerton Road. Trains consisting of three or four trucks were pulled by horses to the road where the gravel was transferred to road vehicles for onward transport. Along the length of the left-hand side of the line lay Hill Grounds, 'a lovely wooded copse, full of wild flowers going down to the river'. For much of its length, the tramway shared the same route as the road which provided access to Hill Grounds. There is some evidence that this street running was the cause of at least one accident in July 1907:

A young lad named George Graham, met with an accident early on Friday morning, whilst riding his bicycle on the road leading to Mr. Folkes' gravel pits. It appears that in trying to pass in front of the horse drawing up the trucks he was knocked down and run over. Fortunately, no bones were broken, and he is progressing favourably.

Hill Grounds and the area containing the gravel pit were owned in the 1800s by Reverend Edmund Williamson of Kempston Manor. Ownership later passed to Mrs Anne Charles-Williamson, one of Reverend Williamson's daughters. By this time, the Hill Grounds pit was being worked by Mr William Folkes. The Folkes family lived at 'Stoneyside', a large cottage close to the line's southern terminus. Stoneyside's outbuildings included stabling for two horses, so it is possible that these housed the animals used to pull the trucks.

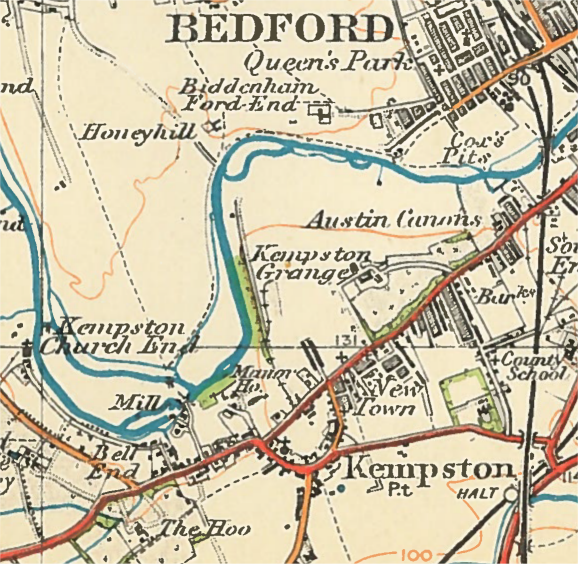
Detail from the Ordnance Survey Popular Edition Sheet 84 (first published 1919), showing the tramway and the surrounding area.

After the death of Mrs Anne Charles-Williamson in 1927, the Kempston Manor estate was divided up for sale. The auction brochure confirms that the tramway was still in place, and that it ran over several of the advertised lots. The brochure also states that 'the tram lines and sleepers on this Roadway and on Lot 23 are the property of Mrs Folkes and will not be included in the Sale'. Mrs Folkes, who had taken over running the gravel pit following the death of her husband bid successfully on Stoneyside and the Hill Grounds wood. These purchases clearly went down well with many of those present at the auction, who applauded as the sales were completed.

The Hill Grounds gravel pit had begun operation in the 1860s and was finally worked out by the mid-twentieth century. The area subsequently became a small residential caravan site. The growth of the area of Kempston formerly known as 'Up End' is thought to be due largely to the employment opportunities presented by the gravel pits in this area, including that at Hill Grounds. Such was the importance of this industry that the area around Bunyan Road was known as 'Gravel End' by 1877.

Narrow gauge railways are known to have served at least two other gravel pits in the area nearby. Short 2 ft (610 mm) gauge railways operated at Biddenham Gravel Pit and Radwell Gravel Pit, near Milton Ernest. The former appears to have been operating around the same time that the Kempston line ran. The latter was a latter development, associated with quarrying to support the second world war effort. It is unclear whether the Kempston tramway was also 2 ft (610 mm) gauge.

Little today remains of the Kempston tramway, beyond—perhaps—a short section of embanked roadbed/trackbed at the southerly end of the line. Stoneyside and its outbuildings still stand.
