= Kempston Rural =

Civil parish in Bedfordshire, England

Coordinates: 52.120116°N 0.516613°W

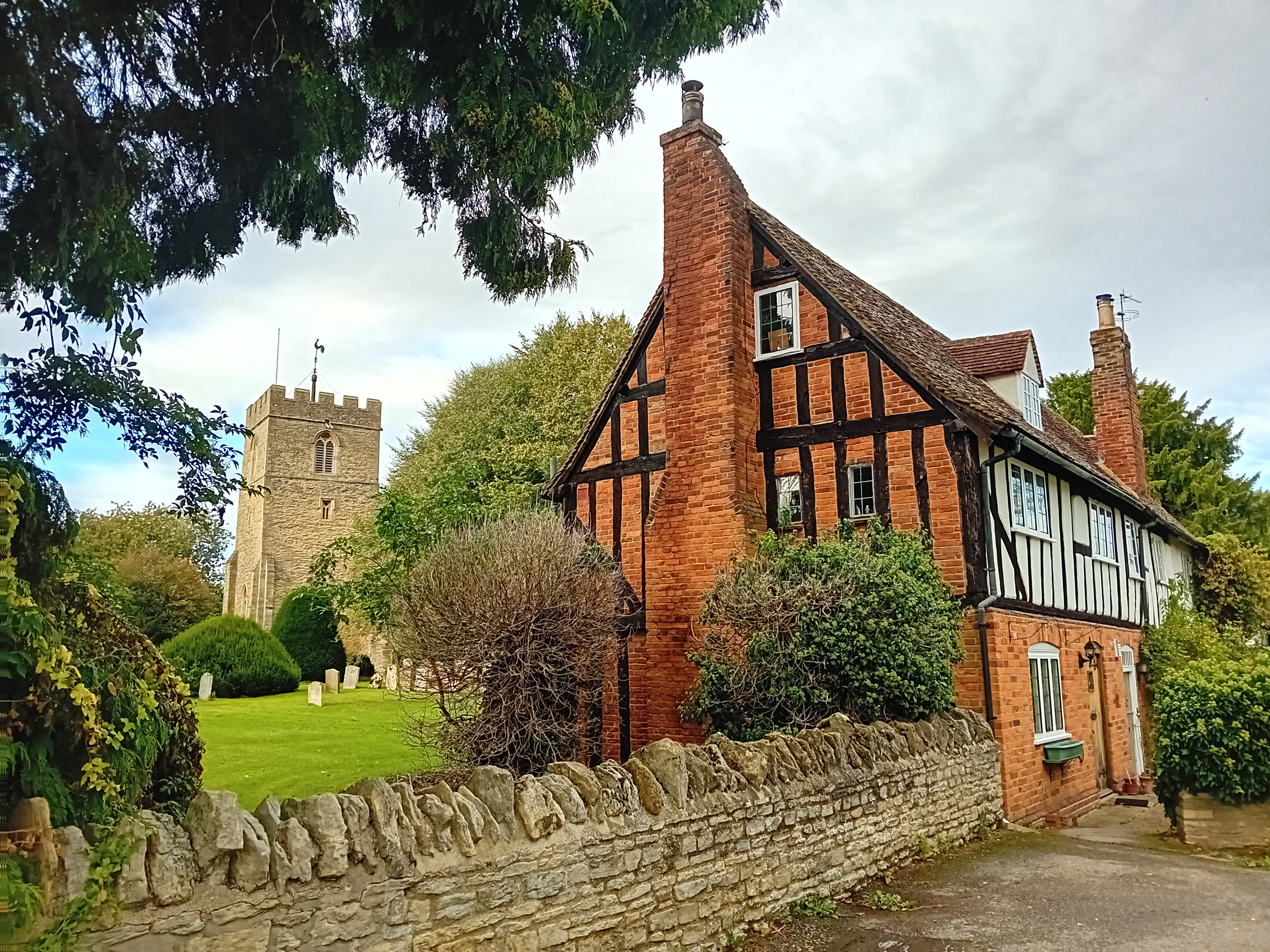
- Church End, Kempston

- Location within Bedfordshire
- Population: 2,764 (2021)
- OS grid reference: TL015479
- Civil parish: Kempston Rural
- Unitary authority: Bedford
- Ceremonial county: Bedfordshire
- Region: East
- Country: England
- Sovereign state: United Kingdom
- Post town: BEDFORD
- Postcode district: MK43
- Dialling code: 01234
- Police: Bedfordshire
- Fire: Bedfordshire and Luton
- Ambulance: East of England
- UK Parliament: Mid Bedfordshire

Kempston Rural is a civil parish in the Borough of Bedford in Bedfordshire, England.

== History ==
Kempston Rural was formed in 1896 when the old parish of Kempston was split into two parts - Kempston Urban District (now the town of Kempston), and Kempston Rural parish.

Historically Kempston was a large but lightly populated parish, with a decentralised population pattern. The typical parish in pre-Industrial England had one main village, perhaps complemented by a few hamlets, but in Kempston the settlement around the church - Church End - has never had more than a dozen or so houses, so it has never dominated the parish. When urban growth arrived in Kempston in the 19th century it was concentrated in the eastern parts of the parish, around the neighbouring ends of East End and Up End (i.e. the area around the High Street and St John Street) and in Kempston New Town, close to the boundary of Bedford.

== Geography ==
Kempston Rural is to the west of the town of Kempston, and comprises approximately the western half of the historical ecclesiastical parish of Kempston. The parish includes the small hamlets ("ends" in local parlance) of Box End, Church End, Gibraltar, Green End, West End and Wood End. These five ends each have a dozen or more houses, up to a hundred or so, with Box End and Wood End being the largest and most identifiable of the settlements.

The narrow south western extension of the parish was once known as Bourne End or Kempston Bourne, but the hamlet is now represented only by Meadow Farm. Other semi-forgotten "ends" in Kempston Rural - now represented by just a house or two - include Crow End and Littleworth End, in the Western part of the parish, and Moor End and Mill End, both of which lie to the north of Box End, towards Bromham.

Not all of "rural" Kempston is in Kempston Rural: there is one "end" of the old parish - Kempston Hardwick - which is now within the boundaries of the Stewartby civil parish, and the rural land either side of Ridge Road at the Bury and Bell End Farm, is in Kempston Urban.

All Saints' Church at Church End, was originally the parish church for the whole of Kempston, and is the most notable historical building in either part of Kempston.

== Governance ==
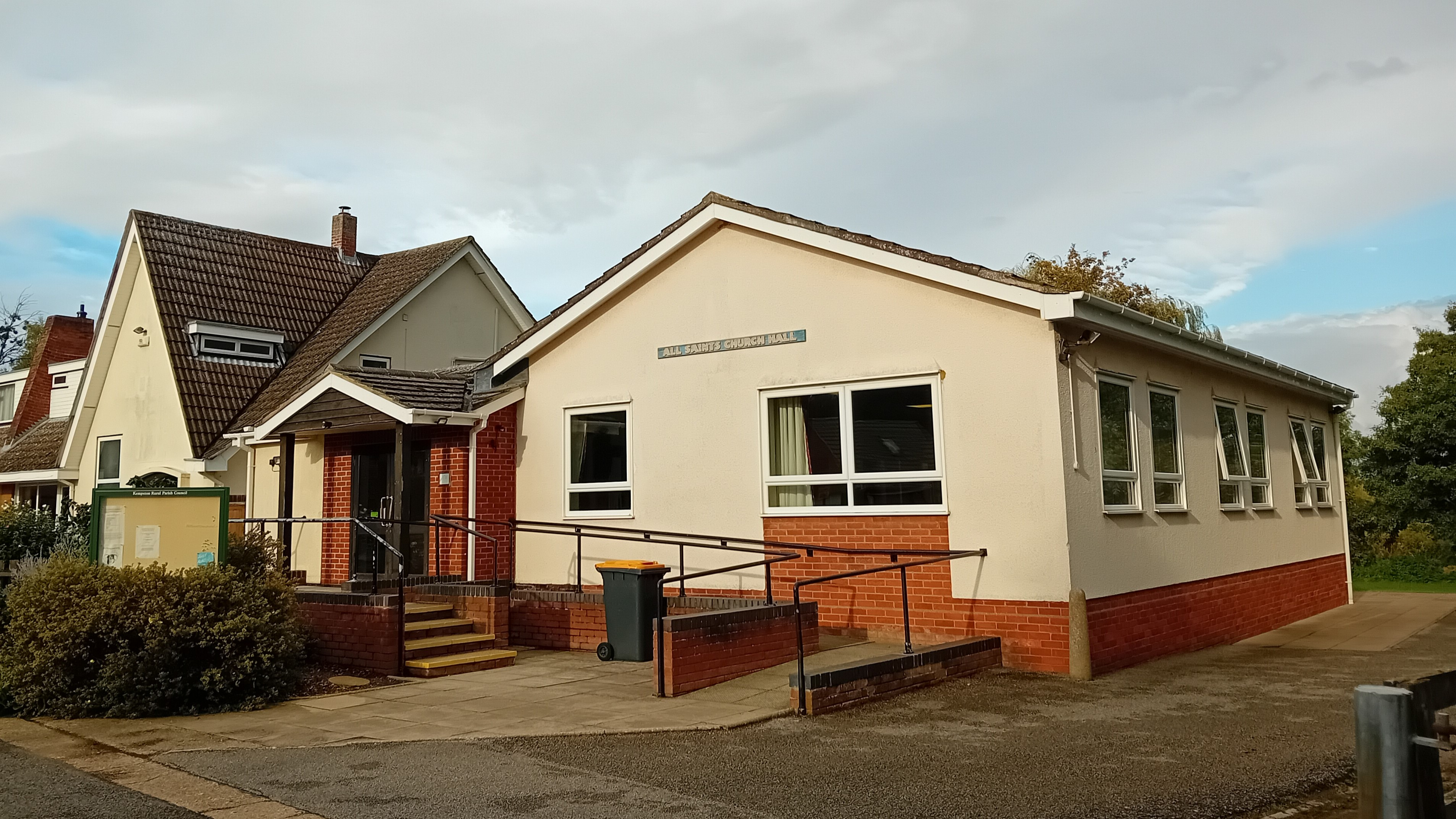
Church Hall at Church End

There are two tiers of local government covering Kempston Rural at civil parish and unitary authority level: Kempston Rural Parish Council and Bedford Borough Council. The parish council meets at the Church Hall in Church End.

For local election purposes Kempston Rural is in Turvey Ward, which also includes the civil parishes of Stagsden and Turvey. The area is represented on Bedford Borough Council by Mark Smith, elected in May 2007.
