= Kempston North =

Area of Kempston, Bedfordshire, England

Coordinates: 52.12237°N 0.49563°W

- Location within Bedfordshire
- OS grid reference: TL030481
- Civil parish: Kempston
- Unitary authority: Bedford
- Ceremonial county: Bedfordshire
- Region: East
- Country: England
- Sovereign state: United Kingdom
- Post town: BEDFORD
- Postcode district: MK42
- Dialling code: 01234
- Police: Bedfordshire
- Fire: Bedfordshire
- Ambulance: East of England
- UK Parliament: Bedford

Kempston North is an electoral ward and area within the town of Kempston, Bedfordshire, England.

The boundaries of Kempston North are approximately the River Great Ouse to the north west, with Kempston High Street and Bedford Road to the south east. the population at the 2021 census for the ward was 4,174.

The Hillgrounds neighbourhood is within Kempston North.

The area used to be a hamlet called Kempston Up End, but was absorbed into the Kempston Urban District in 1896. Today, Addison Howard Park and Kempston Pool are located within the boundaries of Kempston North.
