= Daubeney Academy =

Location
- Orchard Street; Kempston, Bedfordshire, MK42 7PS; England; 52.1137°N 0.4855°W

Information
- Former name: Daubeney Middle School
- Type: Academy
- Established: 1972
- Local authority: Bedford Borough Council
- Trust: Chiltern Learning Trust
- Department for Education URN: 138067 Tables
- Ofsted: Reports
- Head of school: Chris Carter
- Gender: Coeducational
- Age range: 11–16
- Enrolment: 575 (2025)
- Capacity: 600
- Website: www.daubeneyacademy.co.uk

Daubeney Academy (formerly Daubeney Middle School) is an 11–16 coeducational secondary school located in Kempston, Bedfordshire, England. It was established in 1972 and is part of the Chiltern Learning Trust.

== History ==
The school was established in 1972 as Daubeney Middle School, a middle school for ages 9–13, named after the Manor of Kempston Daubeney (named after Sir Giles Daubeney and his descendants). It converted to an academy in April 2012 and renamed Daubeney Academy. It became a secondary school after changing its age range to 11–16 following a three-year transition that began in 2017.

== Academics ==
Daubeney Academy offers GCSEs, BTECs and OCR Nationals as programmes of study for pupils.

== Events ==
=== Food Tech' Room Fire ===
On the 14th October 2022, a fire broke out in the school’s Food Technology (cooking class) building. Students who had turned up to school had been ushered onto the field whilst waiting to be evacuated.

At around 8:46 AM (BST), the fire brigade received a call reporting the fire. After the fire brigade had arrived, students were allowed out through the nearby Springfield Primary School. School was closed down for the day, and expected to open the following Monday.

The head teacher of the time, John Linehan, thanked the quick-thinking of the staff and quick response of the fire brigade, along with the support from the surrounding primary schools.
