= Kempston Urban District =

History of Bedfordshire

Coordinates: 52.121°N 0.489°W

Kempston
- Urban district
- Population
  - 1901: 4,729
  - 1971: 12,485
- History
  - Created: 1 April 1896
  - Abolished: 31 March 1974
  - Succeeded by: Bedford Borough
  - HQ: Kempston
- Contained within
  - County Council: Bedfordshire
- Map of boundary as of 1971

Kempston was an urban district in Bedfordshire, England, between 1896 and 1974.

== Formation ==
The historic parish of Kempston covered a large area to the south-west of the town of Bedford. From 1835 Kempston had been part of the Bedford Poor Law Union, and therefore became part of the Bedford Rural Sanitary District under the Public Health Acts of 1872 and 1875. The Bedford Rural Sanitary District became the Bedford Rural District under the Local Government Act 1894.

By this time, the north-eastern part of Kempston parish (closest to Bedford) was becoming increasingly urbanised. Within months of the Bedford Rural District being established, work began to create an urban district council for the more built-up part of the parish. In June 1895 Bedfordshire County Council decided that the parish of Kempston should be split between a Kempston Urban District and a new parish for the remainder called Kempston Rural which was to stay in the Bedford Rural District. These changes came into force on 1 April 1896.

The first meeting of the Kempston Urban District Council was held on 18 May 1896 at the Bedford Road School in Kempston, with Paul Williams Wyatt being appointed the first chairman. He was a clergyman, being the chaplain of the Savoy Chapel at the time, but had previously served between 1889 and 1894 as the first vicar of St Leonard's Church, just over the borough boundary into Bedford.

== Premises ==
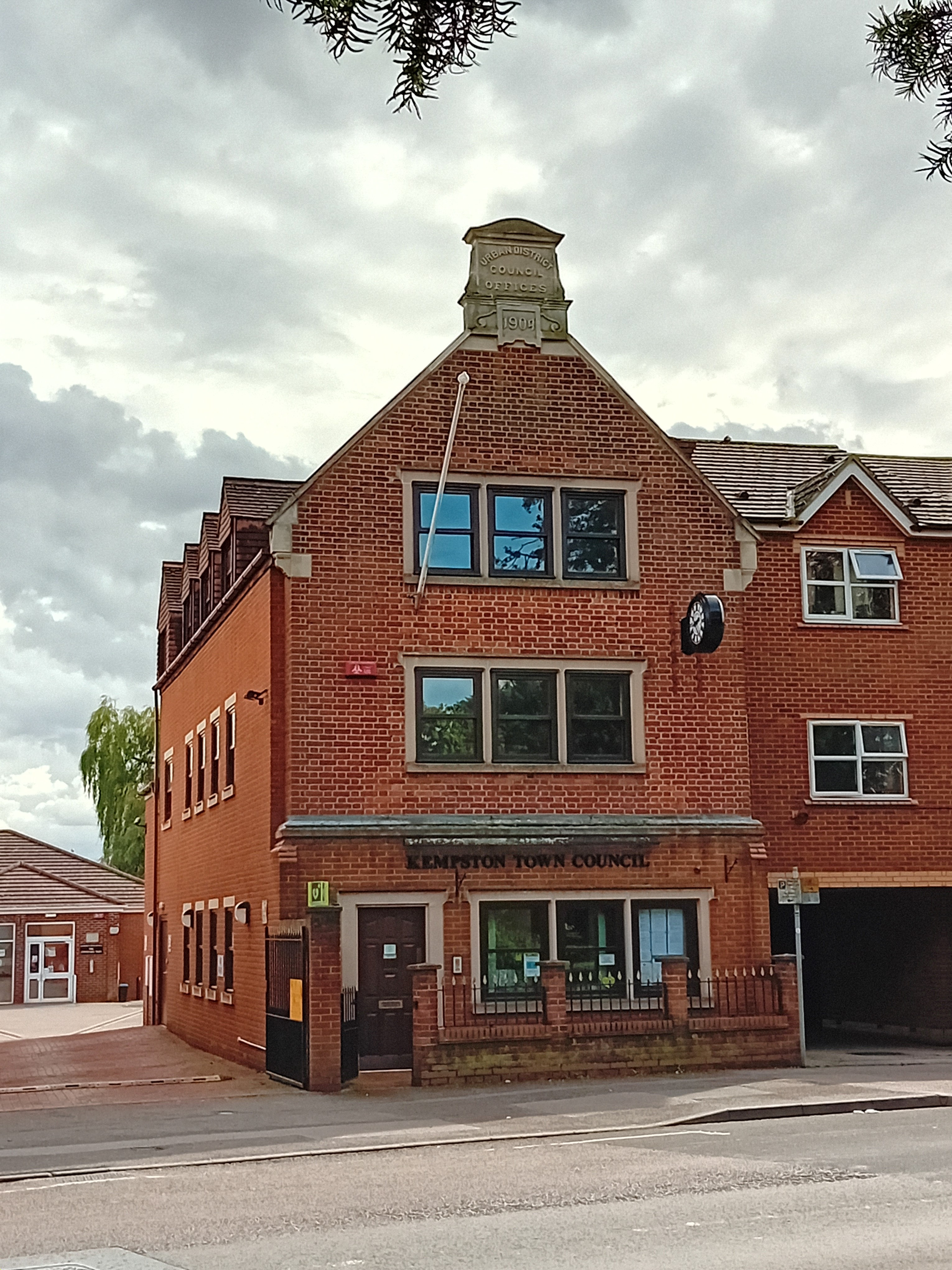
104 Bedford Road, Kempston – built as the Urban District Council's headquarters in 1904

For the first few years of its existence, Kempston Urban District Council met at Bedford Road School in Kempston. New offices and a council chamber were built in 1904 at 104 Bedford Road, Kempston, being officially opened on 13 October 1904. The council stayed at 104 Bedford Road until 1970 when it moved to The Manor on Manor Drive in Kempston.

== Abolition ==
Kempston Urban District was abolished under the Local Government Act 1972, becoming part of Bedford District on 1 April 1974. A successor parish was created covering the area of the former urban district, with its council taking the name Kempston Town Council, which continued to be based at The Manor until 1996 when it returned to 104 Bedford Road. A community centre was built behind 104 Bedford Road at the time, which was named Centenary Hall, marking the anniversary of the creation of the Urban District Council a hundred years earlier.
