= Kempston South =

Area of Kempston, Bedfordshire, England

Coordinates: 52.11021°N 0.50363°W

- Location within Bedfordshire
- Population: 4,099 (2011 Census. Ward)
- OS grid reference: TL025468
- Civil parish: Kempston
- Unitary authority: Bedford
- Ceremonial county: Bedfordshire
- Region: East
- Country: England
- Sovereign state: United Kingdom
- Post town: BEDFORD
- Postcode district: MK42
- Dialling code: 01234
- Police: Bedfordshire
- Fire: Bedfordshire
- Ambulance: East of England
- UK Parliament: Bedford

Kempston South is an electoral ward and area within the town of Kempston, Bedfordshire, England.

The boundaries of Kempston South are approximately Elstow Road to the north, the A421 road to the south and east and Woburn Road to the west.

The area was developed from 1870 onwards under the name of Kempston New Town. In 1896 the settlement was absorbed into the Kempston Urban District. Today, Kempston Interchange Retail Park and the headquarters of Bedfordshire and Luton Fire and Rescue Service are located within the boundaries of Kempston South.
