= Queens Park Football Ground (Bedford) =

Football ground in England

- Location: Nelson Street, West Bedford
- Coordinates: 52°07′51.3″N 0°28′59.4″W
- Opened: 1910s
- Closed: 1982

The Queens Park Football Ground was a football ground located at the end of Nelson Street in the Queens Park area of Bedford on the north side of the River Great Ouse.

== Football ==
The ground hosted Bedford Town F.C also known as Bedford Eagles from about 1910 until 1982.

== Greyhound racing ==
Greyhound racing started during 1975 following the construction of a track around the perimeter of the football pitch. Bedford Town Eagles required a financial boost and the introduction of greyhound racing had the desired effect because in 1979 it brought in an extra income of £10,000 as compared to the £4,000 football income. The greyhound racing was independent (not affiliated to the sports governing body the National Greyhound Racing Club) and was known as a flapping track which was the nickname given to independent tracks.

== Closure ==
The lease to the football team was not renewed by ground owner Charles Wells in 1982, which resulted in both the football and greyhound racing coming to an end. Warehouse facilities were erected on the site before being taken over by an extension to the Wells & Youngs Brewery.
