= Kempston Barracks =

Military building in Kempston, Bedford, England

- Kempston
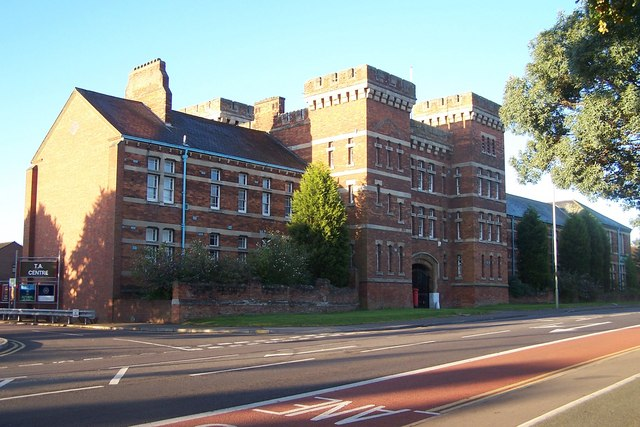
- Kempston Barracks keep

Site information
- Type: Barracks
- Operator: British Army

Location
- Location within Bedfordshire
- Coordinates: 52°07′28″N 00°29′01″W

Site history
- Built: 1875–1876
- Built for: War Office
- In use: 1876-1958

Garrison information
- Occupants: Bedfordshire and Hertfordshire Regiment

Kempston Barracks is a former military installation at Kempston in Bedfordshire.

== History ==
The barracks were built in the Fortress Gothic Revival Style and completed between 1875 and 1876. Their creation took place as part of the Cardwell Reforms which encouraged the localisation of British military forces. The barracks became the depot for the two battalions of the 16th (Bedfordshire) Regiment of Foot. Following the Childers Reforms, the regiment evolved to become the Bedfordshire Regiment with its depot in the barracks in 1881.

The barracks went on to be the depot for the Bedfordshire and Hertfordshire Regiment in 1919. The building was used as a convalescent centre during the Second World War. The barracks were closed when the regiment was merged with the Essex Regiment to form the 3rd East Anglian Regiment (16th/44th Foot) on 2 June 1958; much of the site has been developed for residential use and the keep is now occupied by a masonic lodge.
