= Wootton, Bedfordshire =

Village in Bedfordshire, England

Coordinates: 52.0987°N 0.5319°W

Wootton
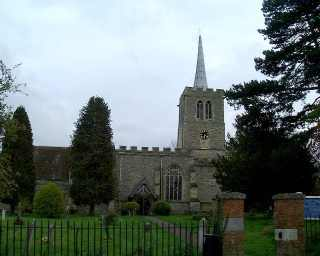
- St Mary's Church

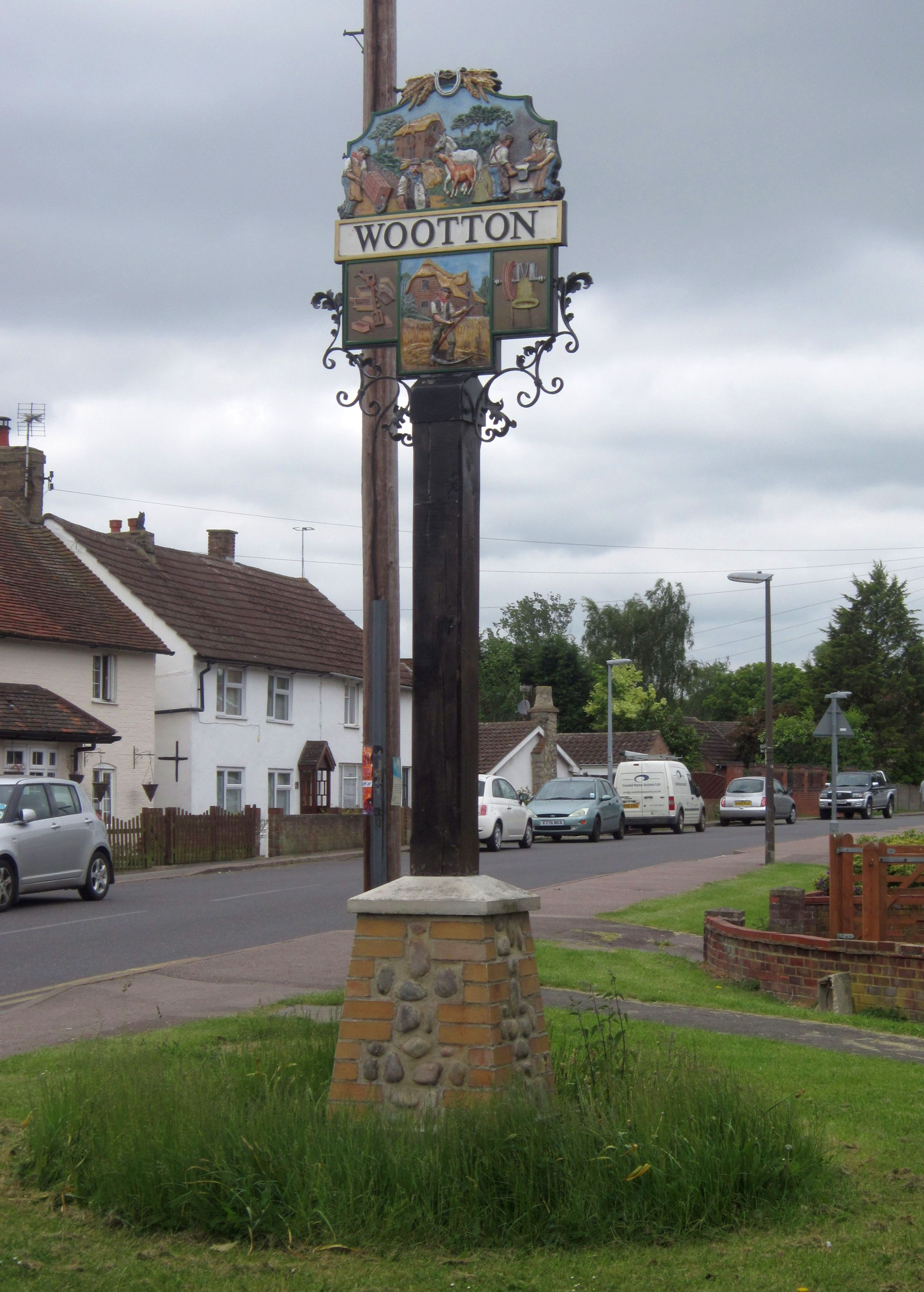
- Village sign

- Location within Bedfordshire
- Interactive map of Wootton
- Population: 4,156 (2011)
- OS grid reference: TL005455
- Unitary authority: Bedford
- Ceremonial county: Bedfordshire
- Region: East
- Country: England
- Sovereign state: United Kingdom
- Post town: BEDFORD
- Postcode district: MK43
- Dialling code: 01234
- Police: Bedfordshire
- Fire: Bedfordshire
- Ambulance: East of England
- UK Parliament: Mid Bedfordshire

Wootton is a large village and civil parish, southwest of Bedford, in Bedfordshire, England. The village includes the areas of Bott End, Church End, Hall End, Keeley Green and Mount Pleasant. In addition to the village of Wootton, the civil parish includes the hamlet of Bourne End and part of the hamlet of Wootton Green.

== History ==
The Domesday Book of 1086, listed Wootton as having 26 residents (20 villagers and six slaves) across ten hides.

Wootton has had a long association with brick-making, but is now mainly a dormitory community for Bedford and Milton Keynes. In the 18th century church bells were made here for several churches in Bedfordshire and adjoining counties. Wootton is noted as a parish and scattered village in the Imperial Gazetteer of England and Wales of 1872. By 1901, the population had risen to 1,252.

The Church of St Mary the Virgin in the village is mainly 14th century but contains two fine monuments in the chancel to members of the Monoux family who died in 1685 and 1707. To the west of the church is Wootton House, an impressive late 17th-century house with a contemporary, red brick stable block.

An archaeological report from 1999 describes Wootton as an agglomeration of "barely distinguishable" separate settlements.

== Demography ==
The population remained fairly steady throughout the first half of the 20th century. But by 1971, the population had climbed to 2,386, a 35.61% (1010 residents) increase within ten years. By 2001 that figure was 4,230.

According to the 2011 Census, the area covered by Wootton civil parish had 4,156 residents who lived in 1,654 households. The median age of the population is 44. Of these residents, 83% describe their health as "good" or "very good" and 2.6% of economically active people aged 16–74 were unemployed.

== Village expansion ==
There has been a great deal of residential development over the last 30 years but some attractive old timber-framed houses still survive.

Planned housing developments include:

- More than 1000 new houses on fields situated next to the A421 road.
- Possible plans to build another 1000 houses on fields located on the road between the village and Kempston.
- Development of Wootton Park as part of the expansion project was led by a consortium of Bovis, Bellway and Taylor Wimpey. ECL Civil Engineering was the sole civil engineering contractor on the 600 homes development south of the village of Wootton.

== Sport and leisure ==
Wootton has a Non-League football team Wootton Blue Cross F.C., founded in 1887. For the 2020–21 season, they are members of the Bedfordshire County Football League Premier Division. Wootton Blue Cross play at Weston Park, that has a capacity of 750. The clubs most successful season came in the 2002–03 season, when they reached the 4th round of the FA Vase.

== Services in Wootton ==
- Wootton Library
- Wootton Vale Retirement Community

== Notable residents ==
- Letitia Dean, EastEnders actress
- Steve Mattin, automobile designer

== Past Residents ==
- Mathew Scherne, clerk & vicar, fl. 1460

== See also ==
- Wootton Upper School
