= Great Denham =

Village in Bedfordshire, England

Coordinates: 52.134444°N 0.514722°W

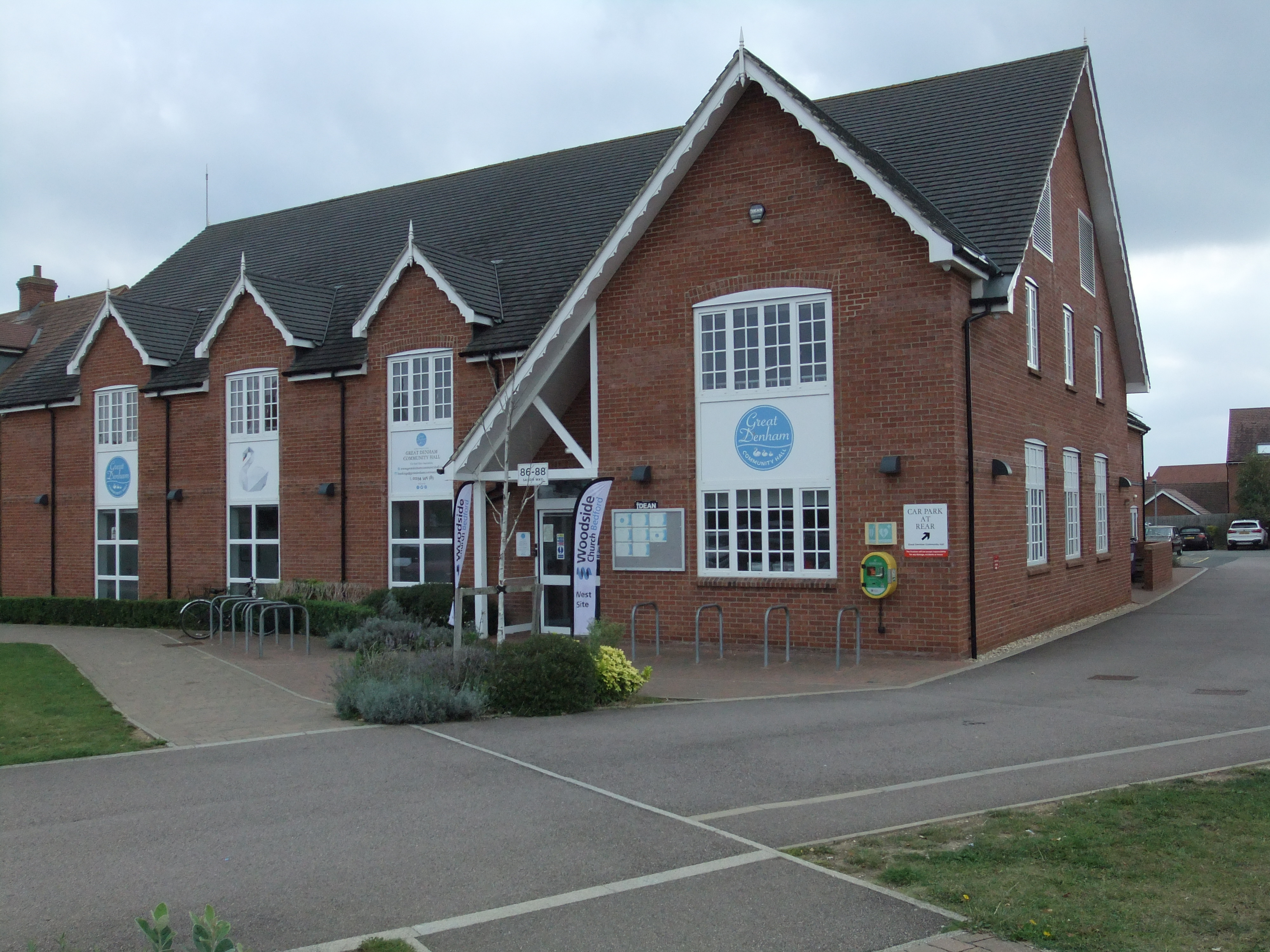
- Community Hall

- Location within Bedfordshire
- Population: 5,061 (2021 Census)
- Unitary authority: Bedford
- Ceremonial county: Bedfordshire
- Region: East
- Country: England
- Sovereign state: United Kingdom
- Post town: BEDFORD
- Postcode district: MK40
- Dialling code: 01234
- Police: Bedfordshire
- Fire: Bedfordshire
- Ambulance: East of England
- UK Parliament: North Bedfordshire

Great Denham is a village and civil parish located in Bedfordshire, England, on the western outskirts of Bedford. The village is the location of Bedford Golf Course.

== History ==
Great Denham has evidence of Neolithic settlement as well as Roman and Saxon presence in the form of coins, pottery and other implements.

By the 7th century, the Great Denham area had been absorbed into the Saxon kingdom of Mercia. In 886 the Saxons and Vikings fixed a formal boundary between them, along the rivers Thames, Lea, and Great Ouse. Great Denham was thus on the border between the Danelaw and Saxon England, which remained hostile adversaries. England was eventually united as one kingdom. St James Church, just over the border of Great Denham in the neighbouring village of Biddenham, was first constructed in the Norman period.

The Great Denham loop of the river remained undeveloped farmland until the Bedford Golf Course was built in the 1990s, together with a 'golf village', with all roads named after golf courses. The Bedford Golf Course, situated within the Great Denham Golf Village, officially opened in April 1999. Great Denham was part of Biddenham parish until April 2007, when the new Parish of Great Denham was created. It covers around 3 km^{2}.

== Location ==
Great Denham is on the banks of River Great Ouse, in a loop carved out by the river flow. It borders Biddenham to the north, Bedford on the west and Kempston to the south. The A6 road spans across the east.

== Community facilities ==
There is a small parade of shops on Anglia Way which includes a Sainsbury's Local supermarket, Indian takeout, beauty salon, a charity shop, cafe, estate agents and off licence with a post office. There is a GP surgery with ProHealth Clinic located inside it on Kingswood Way, and a Community Hall on Saxon Way. The Ouse Valley Way footpath runs through the village. A new bridge across the Great Ouse opened in 2010 which connects the village with Kempston. The country park is a green space providing paths for walking, running and cycling. A number of football pitches are available to book, for both senior and junior 11-a-side, and also a smaller 7-a-side pitch. A sports pavilion provides changing facilities for those using the sports pitches. It is managed by Bedford Borough Council.

In the south of Great Denham, there is a football and basketball court, with another cafe and a playground nearby, overlooking the park.

Great Denham Primary School opened as part of the development in September 2012.

== Government ==
Great Denham Parish Council was created in April 2007 and has nine members elected every four years. The village is represented on the borough council by Cllr Jim Weir.
