= Kempston =

Town in Bedfordshire, England

Coordinates: 52.114°N 0.497°W

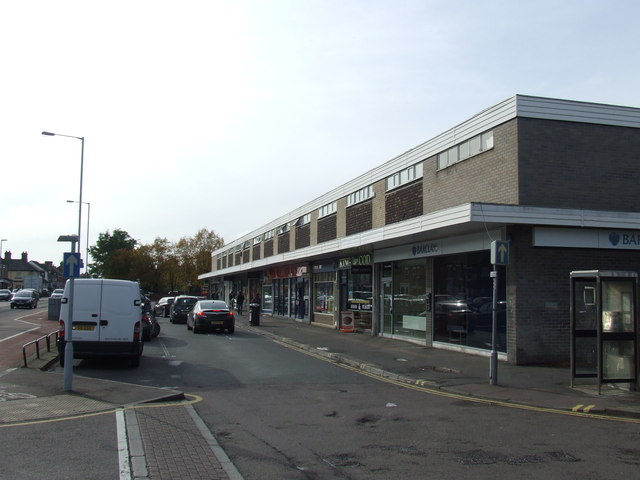
- Kempston Town Centre

- Location within Bedfordshire
- Population: 20,733 (Parish, 2021); 22,785 (Built-up area, 2021)
- OS grid reference: TL035485
  - London: 54.6 m
- Civil parish: Kempston
- Unitary authority: Bedford
- Ceremonial county: Bedfordshire
- Region: East
- Country: England
- Sovereign state: United Kingdom
- Post town: BEDFORD
- Postcode district: MK42
- Dialling code: 01234
- Police: Bedfordshire
- Fire: Bedfordshire
- Ambulance: East of England
- UK Parliament: Bedford

Kempston is a town and civil parish in the Borough of Bedford in Bedfordshire, England, situated around 2 miles (3.2 km) south-west of Bedford town centre. It had a population of 19,330 in the 2011 census, and forms part of the wider Bedford built-up area. The River Great Ouse separates it from the Queen's Park area of Bedford.

== History ==
Kempston Inclosure Act 1802
- Act of Parliament
- Parliament of the United Kingdom
- Long title: An Act for dividing, allotting and inclosing the Open and Common Fields, Meadows, Pastures and other Commonable Lands and Waste Grounds, in the Parish of Kempston, in the County of Bedford.
- Citation: 42 Geo. 3. c. xxxii

Dates
- Royal assent: 15 April 1802

Text of statute as originally enacted

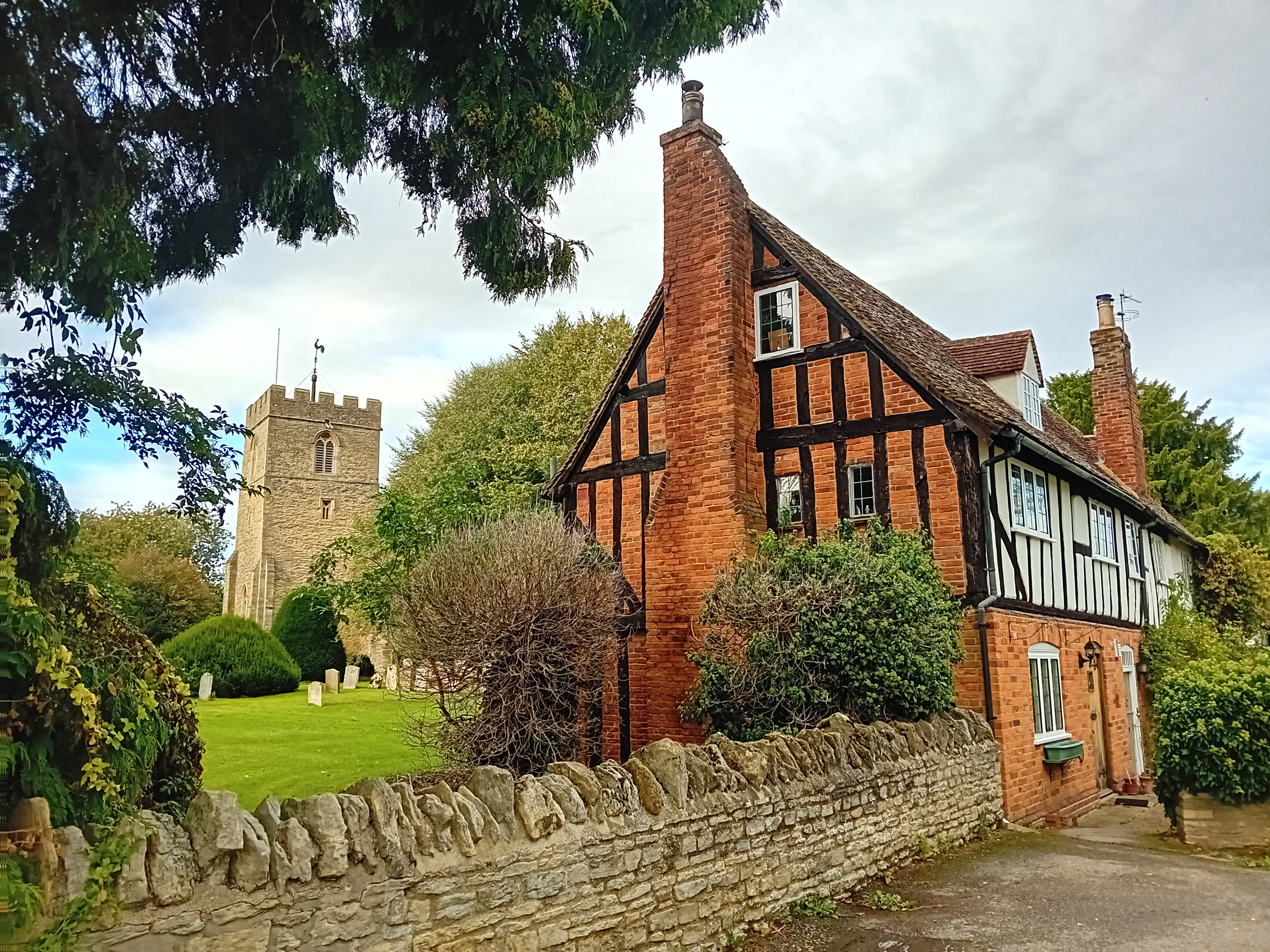
Kempston Church End: All Saints' Church and Church End Cottages

The name Kempston derives from the Primitive Welsh word camm meaning 'crook' or 'crooked' and the Old English tūn meaning 'settlement'. This refers to the town's location on a crook-like bend on the River Great Ouse.

Until the 19th century Kempston was a mainly rural parish. It was one of the largest in Bedfordshire with an area of 5,025 acres (20 km^{2}) at the time of enclosure in 1804, and was in Redbournestoke Hundred. Historically there was no central village, but instead settlement was divided between a number of hamlets called "Ends", including Up End, Bell End, Wood End and Box End. Kempston's parish church, All Saints, was in Church End, which was not the largest end but was fairly central to the parish. In the 19th century East End, Bell End and Up End began to coalesce into a larger settlement. In 1870 developers began to attempt to develop land on the road from Kempston to Bedford under the name "Kempston New Town". Construction was slow at first, but the new district soon began to expand steadily and Kempston acquired a more urban feel. A permanent military presence was established in the town with the completion of Kempston Barracks in 1876.

On 1 April 1896 the parish was divided into "Kempston" (in Kempston Urban District) 1,255 acres (5.08 km^{2}) and of Kempston Rural 3,770 acres (15.3 km^{2}).

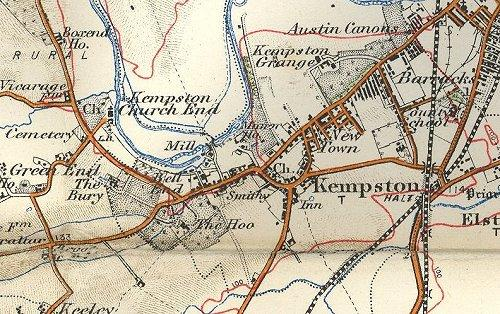
Kempston in 1908

The Urban District was based on East End, Up End and Kempston New Town all of which are in the north eastern part of the parish close to Bedford, and had 86.8% of the total population at the 1901 census. Kempston Rural was three times larger, but remained sparsely populated. Church End, with Kempston's original parish church, was included in the Kempston Rural parish and remains a small hamlet today.

A gravel pit was opened at Hill Grounds in the 1860s and the area around Bunyan Road was known as 'Gravel End' in 1877. The growth of the area of Kempston formerly known as 'Up End' is thought to be due largely to the employment opportunities presented by the gravel pits in this area, including that at Hill Grounds. From around 1910 until the early 1930s the Kempston gravel pit railway served the Hill Grounds pit.

The growth of Kempston's population levelled off in the early decades of the 20th century, with a rise of just 12% between 1901 and 1931, but it then began to expand rapidly. The 1951 population of just under 10,000 was 60% higher than that of 1931; in the second half of the 20th century, the population nearly doubled. In 1974 Kempston Urban District was abolished and Kempston parish was renamed "Kempston Urban" and became part of the Borough of Bedford but with a separate town council with minor powers. On 25 March 1975 the parish was renamed back to "Kempston". For borough election purposes the town is divided into four wards called Kempston Central and East, Kempston North, Kempston South and Kempston West. Kempston Rural remains a civil parish and is part of Turvey Ward for borough election purposes.

== Climate ==
Climate data for Kempston (1981–2010)
Month	Jan	Feb	Mar	Apr	May	Jun	Jul	Aug	Sep	Oct	Nov	Dec	Year
Mean daily maximum °C (°F)	6.9 (44.4)	7.2 (45.0)	10.3 (50.5)	12.9 (55.2)	16.3 (61.3)	19.3 (66.7)	22.1 (71.8)	21.9 (71.4)	18.7 (65.7)	14.4 (57.9)	9.9 (49.8)	7.0 (44.6)	13.9 (57.0)
Mean daily minimum °C (°F)	1.2 (34.2)	0.8 (33.4)	2.6 (36.7)	4.0 (39.2)	6.8 (44.2)	9.8 (49.6)	12.0 (53.6)	12.0 (53.6)	10.1 (50.2)	7.1 (44.8)	3.8 (38.8)	1.5 (34.7)	6.0 (42.8)
Average precipitation mm (inches)	49.0 (1.93)	36.7 (1.44)	40.8 (1.61)	47.3 (1.86)	48.3 (1.90)	51.4 (2.02)	49.2 (1.94)	54.5 (2.15)	54.9 (2.16)	62.5 (2.46)	53.4 (2.10)	49.7 (1.96)	597.6 (23.53)
Average precipitation days (≥ 1.0 mm)	10.5	8.8	9.7	9.2	9.0	8.7	8.7	8.3	8.6	9.9	10.2	10.1	111.7
Mean monthly sunshine hours	63.6	83.1	106.8	168.2	201.4	183.4	197.6	187.2	138.5	109.3	66.0	54.3	1,559.2

=== Population table ===
Year	Kempston Urban	Kempston Rural	Total
1671	–	–	752 (est)
1801	–	–	1,035
1811	–	–	1,161
1821	–	–	1,419
1831	–	–	1,571
1841	–	–	1,699
1851	–	–	1,962
1861	–	–	2,191
1871	–	–	2,706
1881	–	–	3,432
1891	–	–	4,736
1901	4,729	719	5,448
1911	5,459	648	5,997
1921	5,218	656	5,874
1931	5,390	730	6,120
1941	N/A	N/A	No census
1951	8,645	1,171	9,816
1961	9,190	1,289	10,479
1971	12,826	1,306	14,132
1981	15,500	1,280	16,780 (note 1)
1991	17,938	1,163	19,101
2001	19,440	?	see note 2
2011	19,330	1,184	20,514

Note 1: 1981 figures are provisional (more up to date source needed).
Note 2: The 2001 Kempston Urban figure is the combined total for the three urban wards of Kempston East, Kempston North and Kempston South.

=== Etymology ===
The name in its old form is "kemestun" which includes the Brittonic word "cambio" meaning bent or curved. Therefore, the name meant when coined "the enclosed settlement on the bend". The bend was that of the River Great Ouse, noted for its sharp bends upstream of Bedford. It is, however, also possible that "cambita" (the curved one) was the name given to this stretch of the river by the Celtic-speaking population. In this case the name could have developed like that of the river Kembs in the French Department of Haut Rhin. Kempston is also a family name for many individuals from British Ancestry. Kempston was recorded as "camestone" in the Domesday Book and had a 6th-century Anglo Saxon burial site, now home to the Saxon Centre. The meaning of the name Kempston is not known for certain. The element 'ton' is Old English and means a settlement of some sort. The most plausible meaning of the element 'Caemb' is that it was the name of an Anglo-Saxon who owned the settlement. Thus we have the possessive case expressing this relationship by the 's.' The speculation that the element 'Caemb' means bent or curved seems much less likely, because the river consists of many bends and curves and therefore the name would have been of no use in locating a particular settlement.

== Sport and leisure ==
Kempston has a Non-League football team A.F.C. Kempston Rovers who play at Hillgrounds Leisure.

A short lived greyhound racing track was opened by the Box End (Kempston) Dog Club during 1932. The racing was independent (not affiliated to the sports governing body the National Greyhound Racing Club) and was known as a flapping track, which was the nickname given to independent tracks. Racing continued for just two more years.

== Churches ==
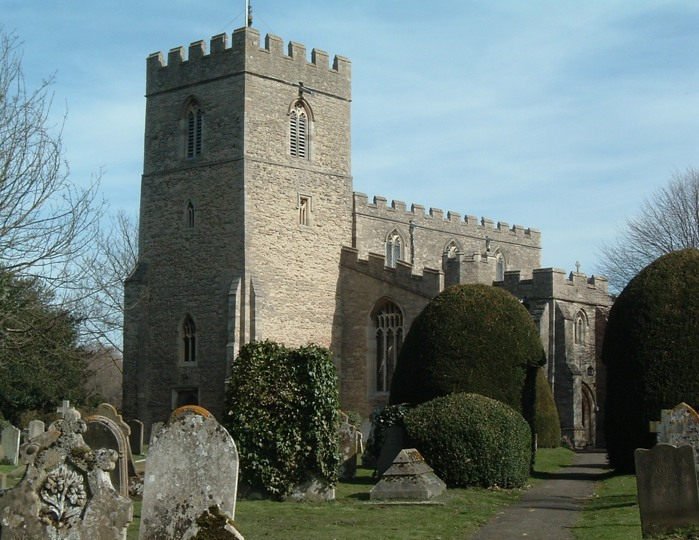
All Saints' Church in Church End

For many centuries, All Saints' Church in Church End, which was first Catholic and later Anglican, was the only place of worship in Kempston. It is attractively situated in a green churchyard close to the river, and the location is still rural. William the Conqueror's niece Judith commissioned the west tower, nave and chancel in 1100. The tower arch and chancel arch remain from Norman times. The aisles were added in the 13th century. In the 15th century the windows were replaced, the tower was heightened and the nave walls were also heightened, forming a clerestory. The font is 14th-century. Refurbishments were carried out in the 19th century, and the north and south galleries were added at that time to accommodate children.

In the 19th century two additional Church of England churches were built to accommodate the rising population. The first was St John's in Up End, which was consecrated in 1868. It soon suffered from subsidence, possibly caused by an underground stream. The burgeoning population of Kempston New Town was served by St Stephen's, a temporary iron church in Spring Road which was built in 1888. After a member of the locally prominent Williamson family bequeathed £8,000 for the purpose in 1927 the Church of the Transfiguration (Transfiguration Church, Kempston) was built in Bedford Road to replace two unsatisfactory Victorian churches. It is a solid work in red brick and was consecrated in 1940. St John's was unused as a church after that and was eventually demolished in 1965. St Stephen's was sold to the Saunders' leather factory on nearby College St.

Methodism has been prominent in Kempston since the mid-19th century. The first Methodist chapel in the parish was built in Bell End in 1839, and its capacity was expanded by adding a gallery in 1843. In 1860 a larger replacement was constructed in the High Street at a cost of £600. The modern Kempston West Methodist Church now stands on the site. Kempston East Methodist Church in Bedford Road was opened in 1904 to serve the new parts of Kempston in the direction of Bedford. Sir Frederick Howard donated the site and £1,000, the Twentieth Century Trust provided another £1,000 and a local appeal raised around £3,000. The church is an attractive Gothic building in pale rustic Weldon stone, and has a hammerbeam roof. In addition to the two mainstream Methodist churches a small Primitive Methodist chapel was built in Bedford Road in or soon after 1896, when a site was purchased for £65 2s. 6d. It became Newtown Methodist chapel after the merger of the various Methodist churches in the 1930s, but it was sold off in 1959 and used for business purposes.

Kempston abuts both John Bunyan's home parish of Elstow and Bedford, where he was imprisoned. The Bedford church now known as the Bunyan Meeting had members in Kempston from at least 1657, and ministers from the church sometimes preached in private houses in Kempston. The first Congregationalist church building in Kempston was opened in the High Street in 1813. A replacement church was built in Kempston New town in 1871. It was extended in 1888 and a hall was added in 1907.

Up until the Second World War Roman Catholics who lived in Kempston were obliged to worship at a church in Bedford. A Roman Catholic chapel was established during the war at the Army's Grange Camp, which was situated where Hillgrounds is now, and it retained after 1945. The first resident Catholic priest in Kempston was appointed in 1965 and the present small and plain Catholic church in Bedford Road was built at around this time.

The Church of Jesus Christ of Latter-day Saints was first introduced in Bedford and Kempston by a missionary called Willard Richards on 1 August 1837. Bedfordshire was one of the first places in the British Isles to have an LDS Church organised: It was first introduced to the British Isles on 20 July 1837. Between that time and Willard Richards being called back to Preston on 7 March 1838 about 40 people were baptised members of the LDS Church in the Bedford area. Kempston still has Mormon missionaries and membership is steadily increasing. In 1986 the LDS Church completed the building of its Bedford Chapel/Meetinghouse. The Chapel stands near the north west corner of Addison Park close to The Grange. The plot was previously the location of the Kempston Liberal Club. The LDS Church previously met at Silver Jubilee School off Acacia Road in Bedford for at least six years before and various other locations in Bedford before that.

== Education ==
There are four primary schools in the urban area: Balliol Primary School, Bedford Road Primary School, Camestone School and Springfield Primary School. Kempston Rural Primary School serves Kempston Rural. There are two secondary schools in Kempston: Kempston Academy and Daubeney Academy.

Grange Academy, Ridgeway School and St John's School are all located in Kempston. These are special requirements schools for pupils from all over Bedford Borough.

== Estates ==
Kempston's main park is Addison Howard Park, which is part of the grounds of Grange House, once one of the principal residences in the parish, which survives as flats. This estate was owned in the 1880s by the Howard family (ancestors of the randlord Sir George Herbert Farrar Bt and the current Earl of Lonsdale) proprietors of the Britannia Iron Works in Bedford (opposite Bedford Hospital, and also known as George Fisher Castings, before its closure and demolition in the late 20th century). Scions of the Howard family were also settled at the nearby estates of Clapham Park and Biddenham Manor. Grange House was later donated by the Kempston branch of the Howard family to the people of Kempston. There is an indoor swimming pool which opened in the 1980s. Kempston's Sainsbury's supermarket was the chain's largest branch when it opened in the 1970s. The headquarters of the Bedfordshire Police are in Kempston.

Apart from All Saints' Church, the best-known historic buildings are the King William IV pub and Kempston Barracks. The King William is a timber-framed building in bold black and white. The exterior is 17th century, but it is believed to contain much medieval work.

== Media ==
Local news and television programmes are provided by BBC East and ITV Anglia. Television signals are received from the Sandy Heath TV transmitter.

Local radio stations are BBC Three Counties Radio on 95.5 FM, Heart East on 96.9 FM, In2beats on 106.5 FM, and Bedford Radio, a community based radio station which broadcast online.

The town is served by the local newspaper, Bedford Today (formerly Times & Citizen).

== Transport ==
=== Rail ===
The railway stations of Bedford and Bedford St Johns are located roughly 1.5 miles (2.4 km) to the north-east of the town, with the former being serviced by inter-city routes on the Midland Main Line as well as the Marston Vale Line, and the latter only being serviced by routes on the Marston Vale Line.

=== Road ===
The Bedford Southern Bypass on the A421, was constructed in the 1990s and links with the Kempston relief road, built in the 1980s. There is an out-of-town shopping centre called Kempston Interchange Retail Park alongside it, and Asda, Argos and Sainsbury's distribution centres have opened at Marsh Leys site since the early 2000s. Formerly, the Sainsbury's warehouse was a Woolworth's distribution centre, until their bankruptcy in 2009. In 2007, work began on the Bedford Western Bypass which opened in 2010. The road cuts through Kempston Rural, crossing the Great Ouse between the urban area and Church End. In 2011 preliminary work began on extending the Western Bypass to join the A6 to the north of Bedford. In 2003 Bedford Borough Council adopted a planning brief for the land close to the Western bypass that proposes the construction of 1,000 new homes. In December 2010 work finished on construction of a new stretch of the A421 from Kempston to Junction 13 of the M1 motorway, this now provides a full dual carriageway link road between the A1 and the M1, with the construction of an additional section of dual carriageway between M1 J13 and Milton Keynes completed in 2020. The new dual-carriageway runs parallel to the existing road, which will be retained for local use.

=== Bus ===
Most bus services in the town connect to other destinations in Bedfordshire and Milton Keynes, with Uno buses C1, C10 and C11, Stagecoach buses 1 and 53, and Road Runner buses A1, A2, B, D, E and G serving the town.

== Notable people ==
- Frances Latham (1609–1677) born in Kempston, daughter of Sir Lewis Latham who was the falconer to King Charles I, immigrating to Rhode Island in America where many of her posterity became political leaders, state governors and other famous people, giving her the title of "the Mother of Governors".
