= Borough of Bedford =

Unitary authority area in Bedfordshire, England

Bedford Borough of Bedford
- Borough and local government district
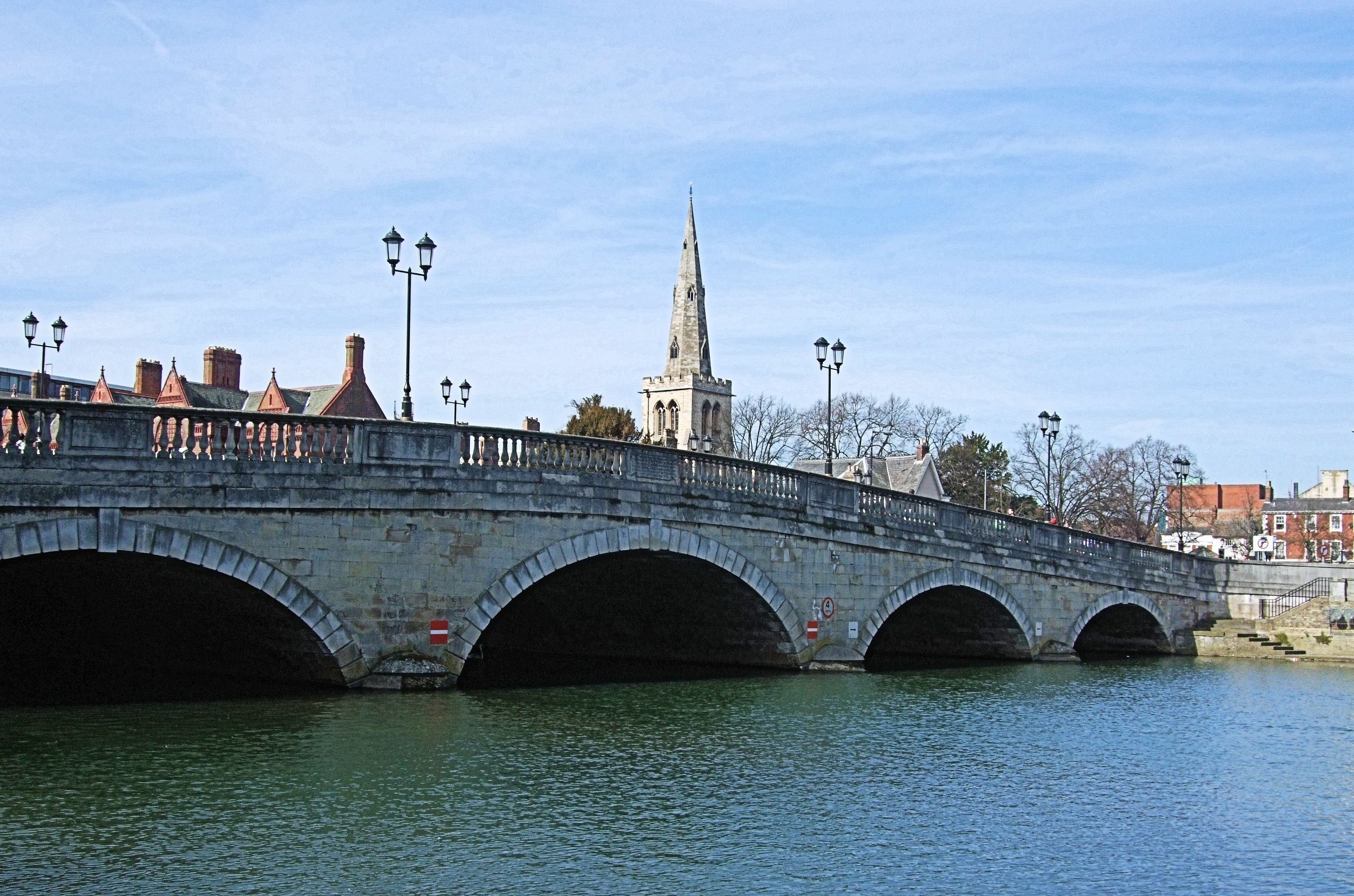
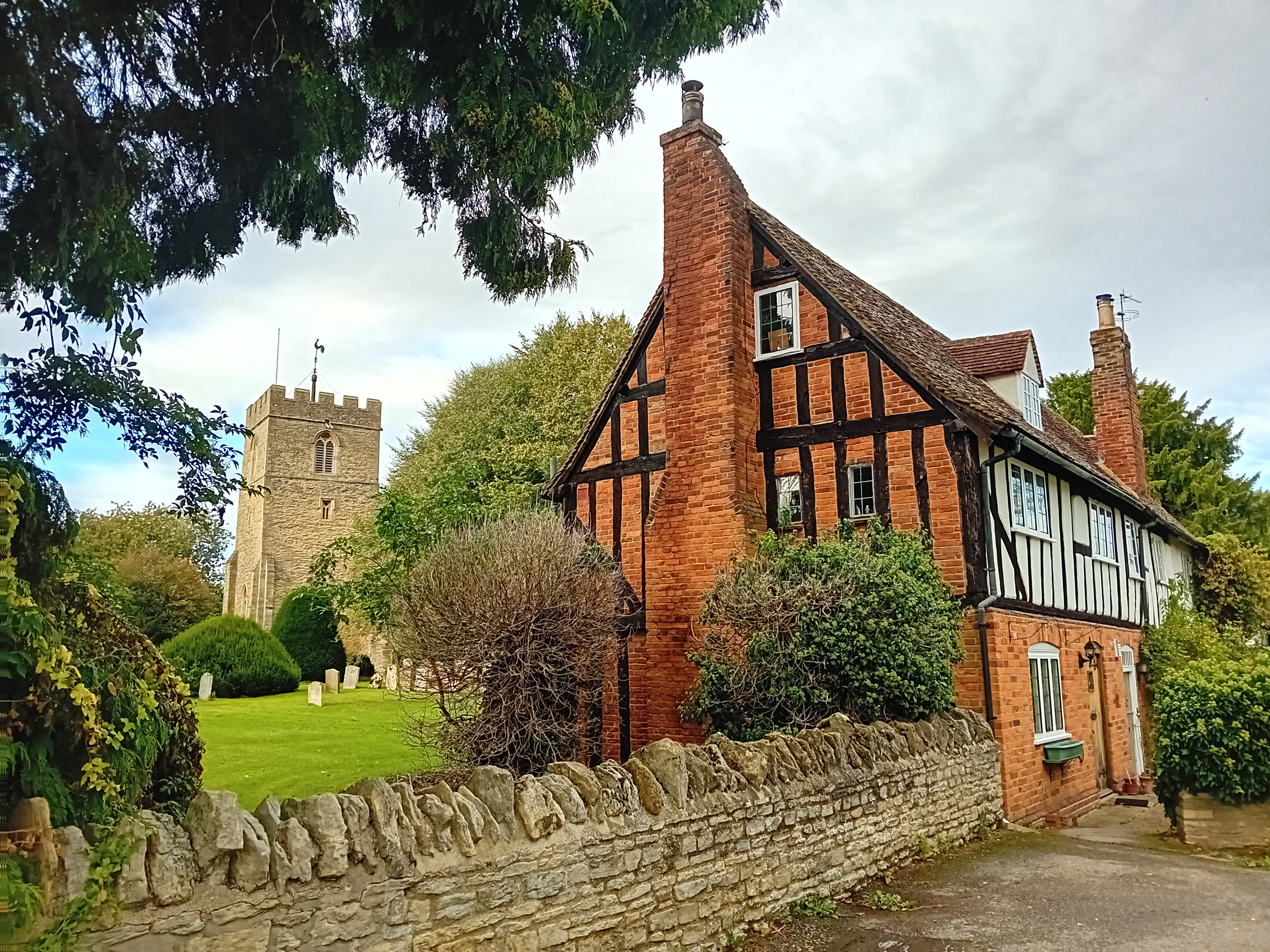
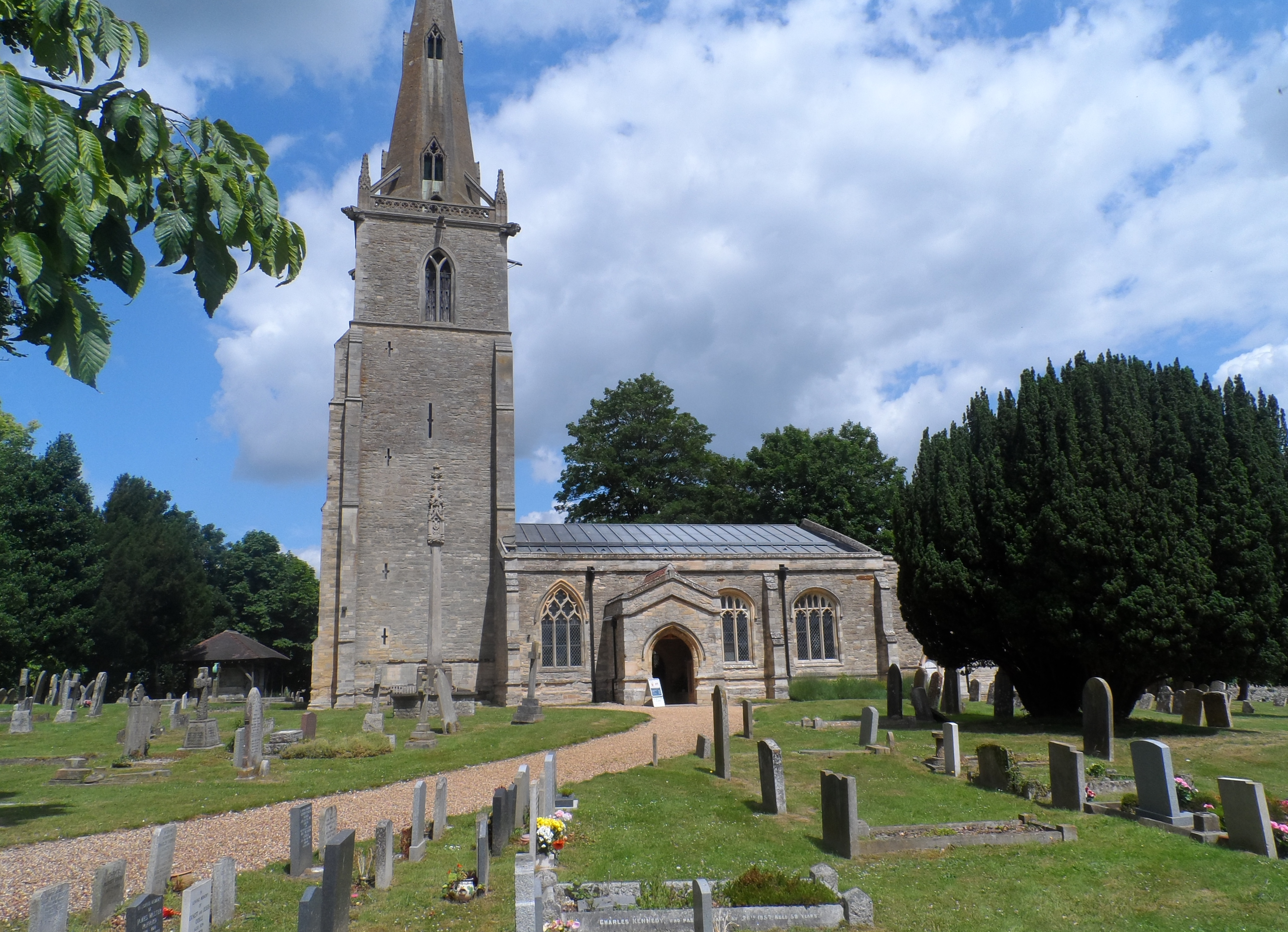
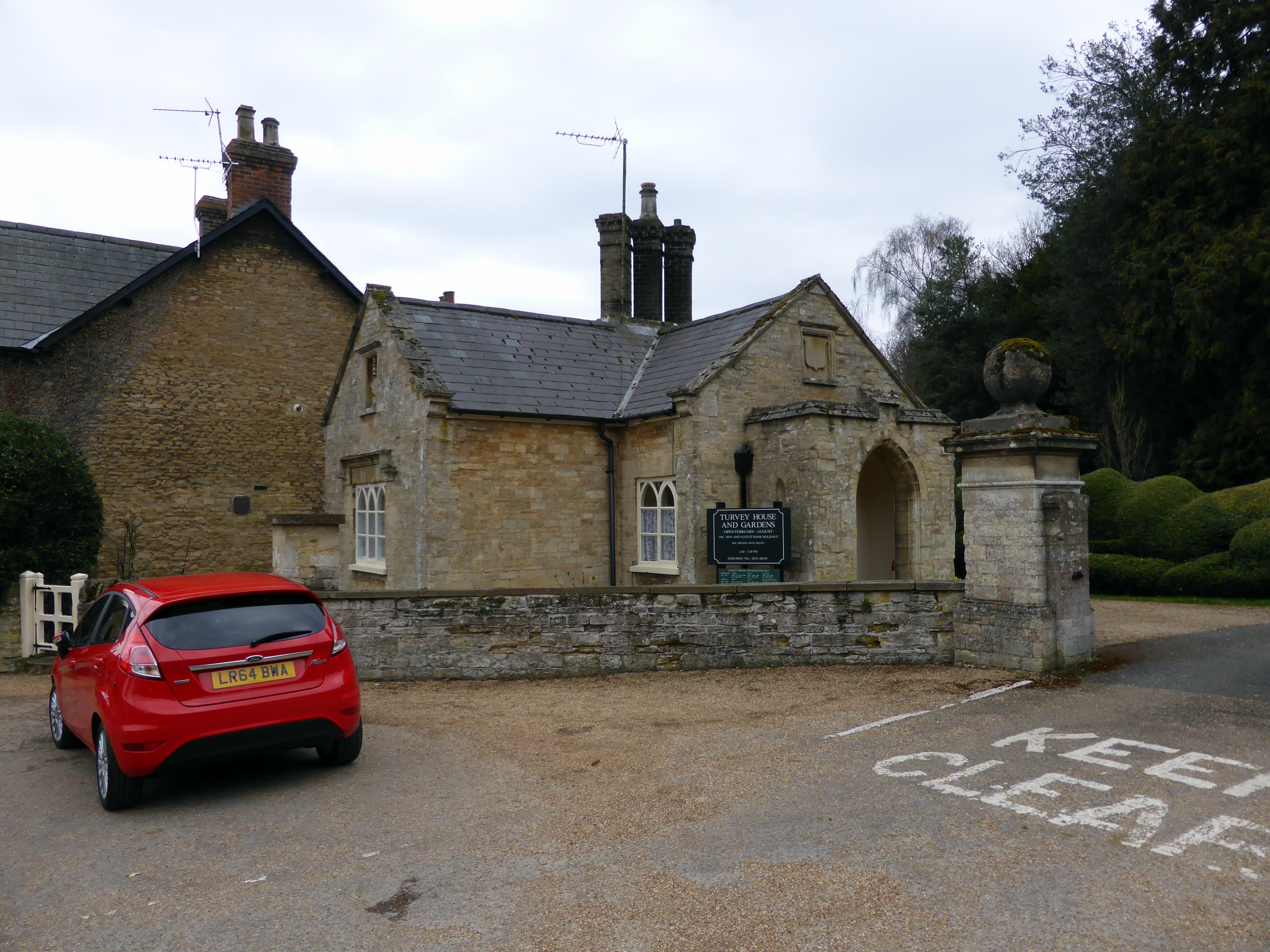
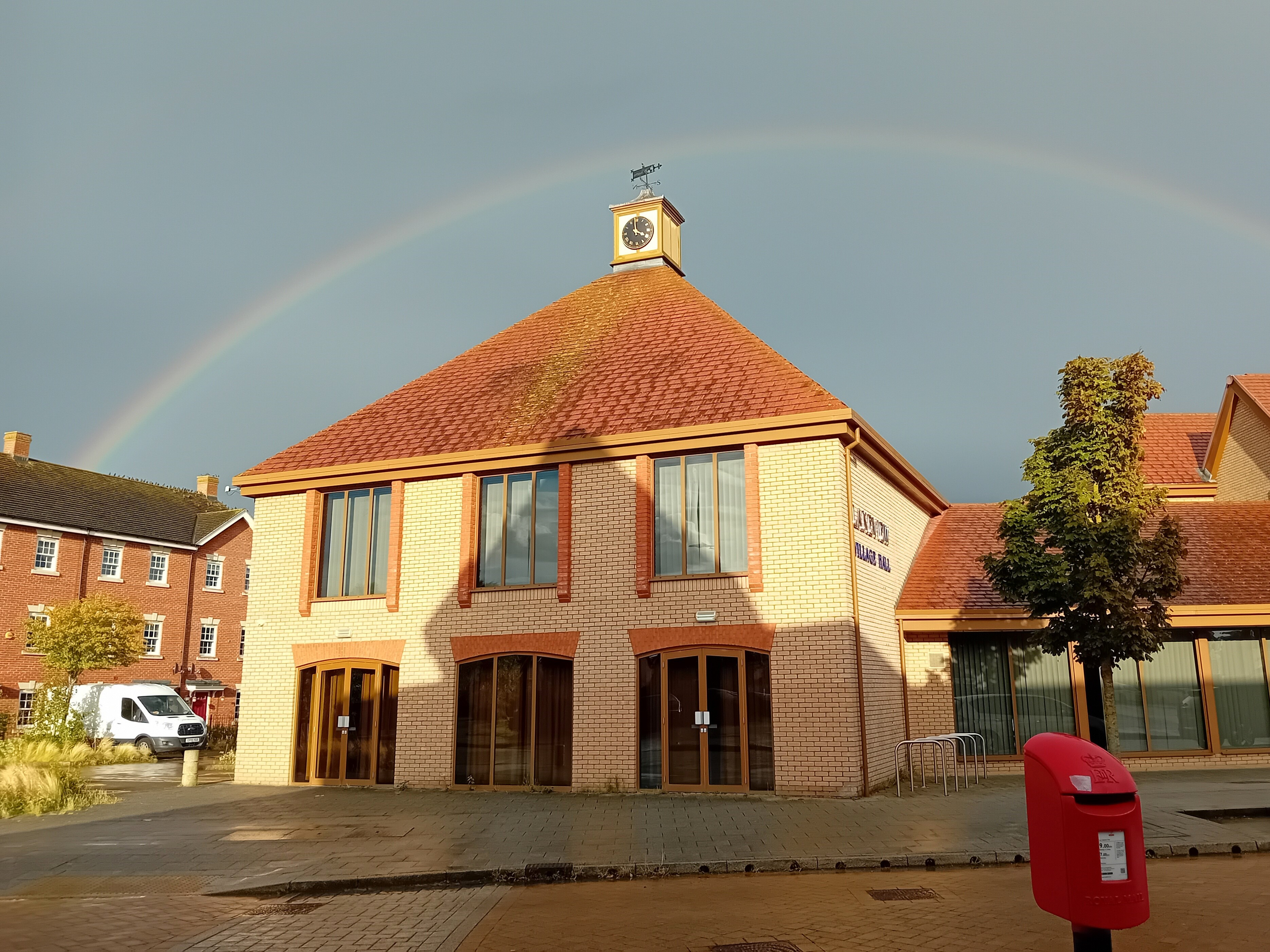
- From left to right; Top:Bedford Bridge with St Paul's Church and Shire Hall; Middle: Kempston Church End and St Peter Church in Sharnbrook; Bottom: The gatehouse to Turvey House in Turvey and the Wixams new settlement.

- Coat of arms of Bedford Borough Council

- Bedford shown within Bedfordshire
- Coordinates: 52°8′0″N 0°27′0″W
- Sovereign state: United Kingdom
- Country: England
- Region: East of England
- Ceremonial county: Bedfordshire
- Established: 1 April 2009
- Administrative HQ: Borough Hall, Bedford

Government
  - Type: Unitary Authority
  - Governing body: Bedford Borough Council
  - MPs: Richard Fuller (C); Alistair Strathern (L); Mohammad Yasin (L)

Area
  - Total: 476 km^{2} (184 sq mi)

Population (2024)
  - Total: 194,976
  - Rank: 105th
  - Density: 409/km^{2} (1,060/sq mi)

Ethnicity (2021)
  - Ethnic groups: List: 75.7% White; 12.6% Asian; 5.3% Black; 4.6% Mixed; 1.8% other

Religion (2021)
  - Religion: List: 47.6% Christianity; 34.1% no religion; 11.2% other; 7.1% Islam
- Time zone: GMT
  - Summer (DST): British Summer Time
- ONS code: 00KB
- NUTS 3: UKH22
- ISO 3166-2: GB-BDF
- Website: bedford.gov.uk

The Borough of Bedford, is a local government district with borough status that encompasses the northern part of Bedfordshire, England. It is administered by Bedford Borough Council, a unitary authority. The council is based in Bedford, the borough's namesake and principal settlement, which is the county town of Bedfordshire.

The Bedford built-up-area is the 71st largest in the United Kingdom and also includes Kempston and Biddenham. Away from the Bedford built-up area the borough includes a large rural area with many villages. 75% of the borough's population live in the Bedford built-up and the five large villages which surround it, which makes up slightly less than 6% of the total land area of the borough.

The borough is also the location of the Wixams new settlement, immediately south of Bedford, which received its first residents in 2009.

== History ==
The ancient borough of Bedford was a borough by prescription, with its original date of incorporation unknown. The earliest surviving charter was issued c. 1166 by Henry II, confirming to the borough the liberties and customs which it had held in the reign of Henry I. The borough became a municipal borough under the Municipal Corporations Act 1835.

The District of Bedford was formed on 1 April 1974 as a merger of the existing borough of Bedford, along with Kempston Urban District and Bedford Rural District. In 1975 the district was granted a royal charter granting borough status as North Bedfordshire. The borough changed its name back from North Bedfordshire to Bedford in 1992.

Bedfordshire's administrative structure was reorganised as part of the 2009 structural changes to local government in England, meaning that Bedford Borough Council became a unitary authority in April 2009. Bedford Borough Council assumed responsibility in areas such as education, social services and transport which were previously provided by Bedfordshire County Council.

== Governance ==
The council is based at Borough Hall on Cauldwell Street on the banks of the River Great Ouse in the centre of Bedford. The building was previously known as County Hall and had been the headquarters of Bedfordshire County Council prior to 2009. The unitary authority area is divided into 28 wards for elections to the Borough Council.

== Parishes ==
Most of the area of the pre-1974 municipal borough of Bedford is unparished, although the parish of Brickhill was created within that area in 2004. The rest of the modern borough, including Kempston (the borough's only CP with a town council), is parished. The parishes are:

- Biddenham
- Bletsoe
- Bolnhurst and Keysoe
- Brickhill
- Bromham
- Cardington
- Carlton and Chellington
- Clapham
- Colmworth
- Cople
- Cotton End
- Dean and Shelton
- Elstow
- Felmersham
- Great Barford
- Great Denham
- Harrold
- Kempston
- Kempston Rural
- Knotting and Souldrop
- Little Barford
- Little Staughton
- Melchbourne and Yielden
- Milton Ernest
- Oakley
- Odell
- Pavenham
- Pertenhall
- Podington
- Ravensden
- Renhold
- Riseley
- Roxton
- Sharnbrook
- Shortstown
- Stagsden
- Staploe
- Stevington
- Stewartby
- Swineshead
- Thurleigh
- Turvey
- Wilden
- Willington
- Wilshamstead
- Wixams
- Wootton
- Wyboston, Chawston and Colesden
- Wymington

== Freedom of the Borough ==
The following people and military units have received the Freedom of the Borough of Bedford.

=== Individuals ===
- Etienne Stott: 11 December 2012.

=== Military Units ===
- Bedfordshire and Hertfordshire Regiment: November 1955
- RAF Cardington: 16 July 1959.
- 287 Regiment Royal Artillery: 5 May 1963.
- 1st Battalion Royal Anglian Regiment: 1980.
- 201 (Hertfordshire and Bedfordshire Yeomanry) Battery Royal Artillery (Volunteers): 3 May 1986.
- RAF Henlow: 26 September 1992.
- 774th USAF Airbase Group: 15 December 1994.
- 134 (Bedford) Squadron Air Training Corps: 1 August 1999.

== See also ==
- List of places in Bedfordshire
- St Paul's Church, Bedford
