= Bedfordshire Fire and Rescue Service =

Fire and rescue service in Bedfordshire, East of England

Operational area
- Country: England
- County: Bedfordshire

Agency overview
- Established: 1 April 1997
- Employees: 600

Facilities and equipment
- Stations: 14
- Engines: 22

Website
- www.bedsfire.gov.uk

Bedfordshire Fire and Rescue Service is the fire and rescue service for the ceremonial county of Bedfordshire in England, consisting of the unitary authorities of Bedford, Central Bedfordshire, and Luton.

The service employs 550 staff on a variety of conditions of service. These include firefighters on the wholetime shift system, firefighters on the retained duty system, fire officers on the flexible duty system, fire control operators and support staff.

== History ==
Bedfordshire Fire Brigade was recreated in 1947 after the disbanding of the National Fire Service. Luton began operating an independent brigade when it became a county borough in 1964. In 1974, the Luton brigade was re-absorbed into Bedfordshire, which was renamed Bedfordshire Fire Service. It was later renamed to Bedfordshire & Luton Fire and Rescue Service in 1997, on the same day that Luton became a unitary authority. This reflected that Luton was no longer in the administrative county of Bedfordshire, though Luton remained in the ceremonial county. The brigade changed to its current name in 2012, three years after the administrative county was abolished and divided into two unitary authorities.

The county's control room was due to move into a regional control centre in Cambridge in 2011 as part of the abandoned FiReControl project. The control room was kept within the service and has now been confirmed as the first fire service in the UK to be implementing a cloud based mobilising solution and integrated CAD system by Motorola in mid 2021.

== Performance ==
Every fire and rescue service in England and Wales is periodically subjected to a statutory inspection by His Majesty's Inspectorate of Constabulary and Fire & Rescue Services (HMICFRS). The inspections investigate how well each service performs in each of three areas. On a scale of outstanding, good, requires improvement and inadequate, Bedfordshire Fire and Rescue Service was rated as follows:

HMICFRS Inspection Bedfordshire
Area	Rating 2018/19	Rating 2021/22	Description
Effectiveness	Good	Good	How effective is the fire and rescue service at keeping people safe and secure from fire and other risks?
Efficiency	Requires improvement	Requires improvement	How efficient is the fire and rescue service at keeping people safe and secure from fire and other risks?
People	Requires improvement	Good	How well does the fire and rescue service look after its people?

== Fire stations ==
Bedfordshire Fire and Rescue Service operates 14 fire stations, of which five are crewed on 24-hour shifts (wholetime), one day crewed (Monday–Friday, 09:00–18:00) and the remainder are crewed by retained firefighters who live near to their fire station and can arrive there within six minutes of a call-out.

== See also ==
- Bedfordshire Police
- East of England Ambulance Service
- List of British firefighters killed in the line of duty
