= List of alumni of Pembroke College, Cambridge =

Alumni of Pembroke College, Cambridge

== Academics ==
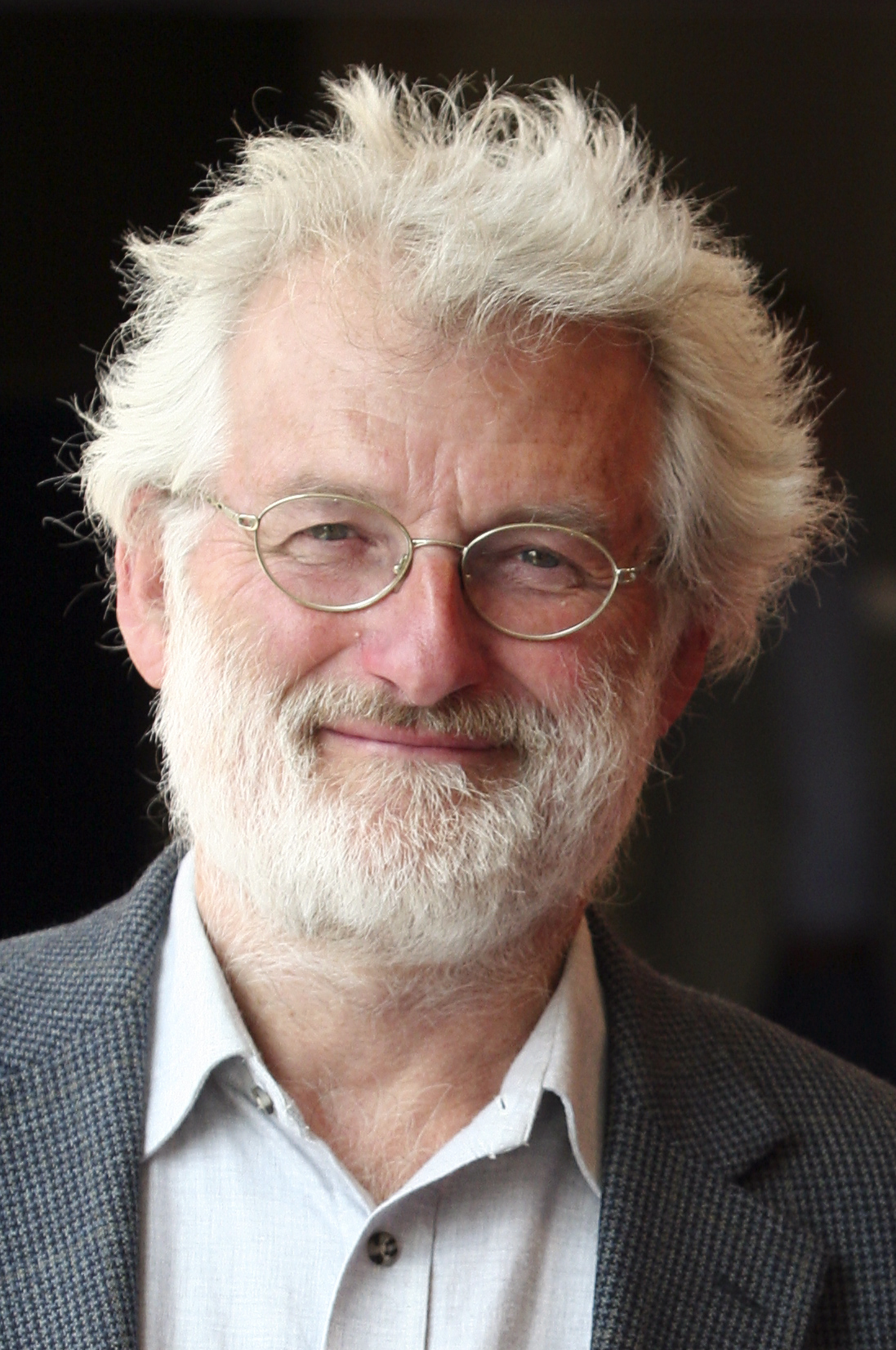
John Sulston, British biologist and Nobel Prize Winner

- Trevor Allan, legal philosopher
- David Armitage Bannerman, Ornithologist
- Christopher Clark, Regius Professor of History, University of Cambridge
- Maurice Dobb, Economist
- Simon Donaldson, Mathematician; Fields Medallist (1986)
- Ian Fleming, Organic chemist, emeritus professor of the University of Cambridge and emeritus fellow
- William Fowler, Nobel prize winner for Physics
- Tom Harrisson, Ornithologist, anthropologist, soldier, co-founder of Mass-Observation
- Samuel Harsnett, Master, Vice-Chancellor of the University of Cambridge, later Archbishop of York and theological writer
- Bryan Keith-Lucas, Political scientist
- Leslie Peter Johnson, Germanist
- Sir Henry James Sumner Maine, Jurist and Historian
- D. H. Mellor, Philosopher
- Messenger Monsey, Physician
- Rodney Porter, Nobel prize winning biochemist
- Michael Rowan-Robinson, Astronomer and astrophysicist
- George Gabriel Stokes, Mathematician, physicist
- John Sulston, Chemist, Nobel prize winner
- William Turner, Physician
- Lawrence Wager, Geologist, explorer and mountaineer
- Leonard Whibley, Greek scholar
- Yorick Wilks, Computer scientist, professor of artificial intelligence
- George Crichton Wells, Dermatologist, first described Well's syndrome
- Timothy Winter, Academic, theologian and Islamic scholar

== Artists and writers ==
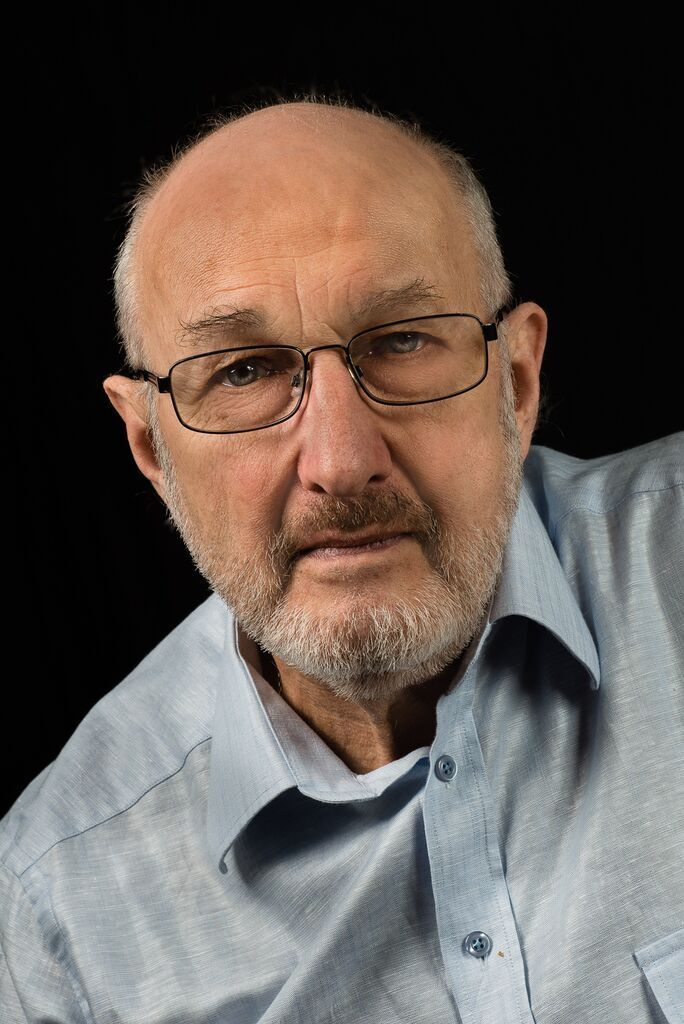
Richard Berengarten, poet

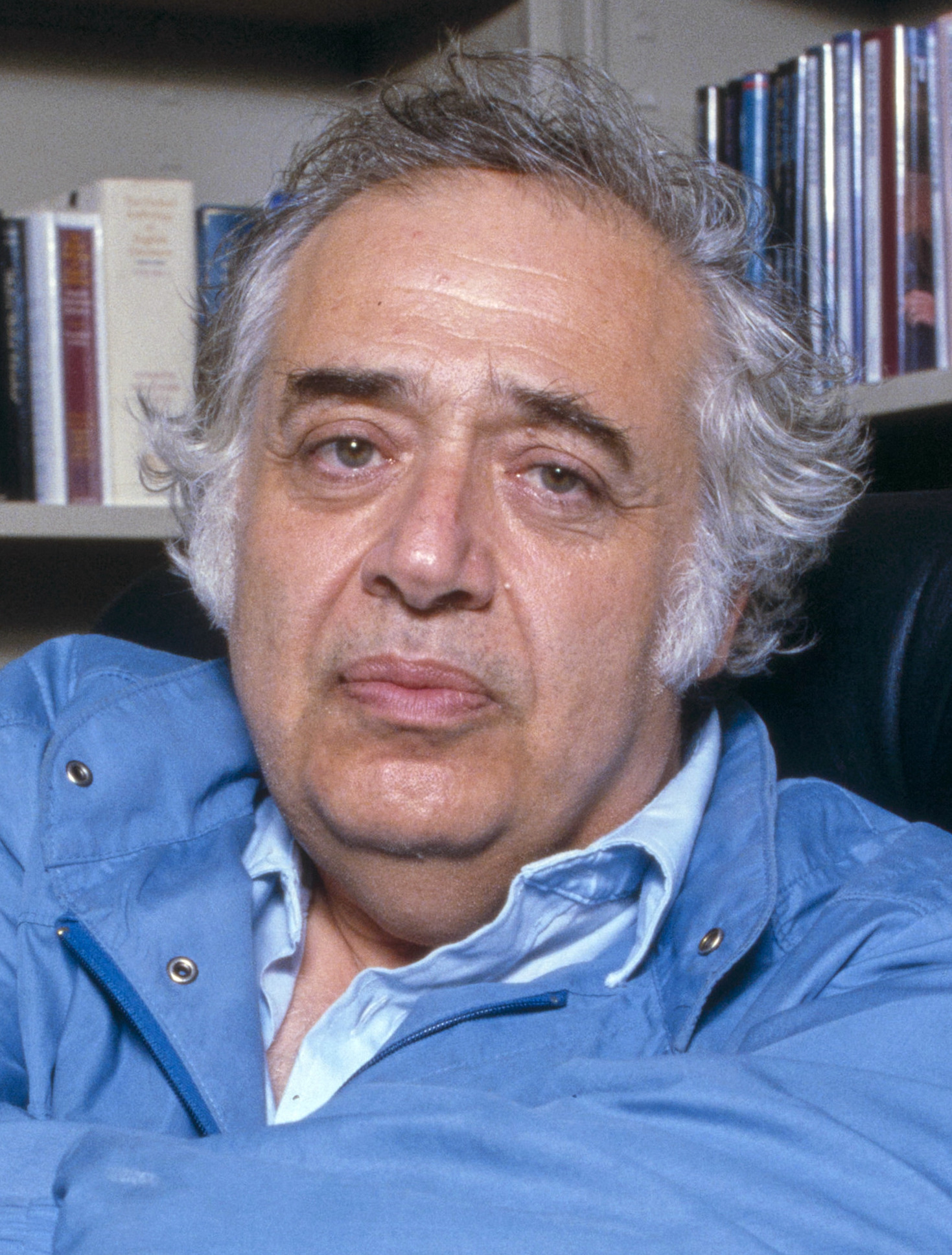
Harold Bloom, literary critic

Peter Cook, British comedian

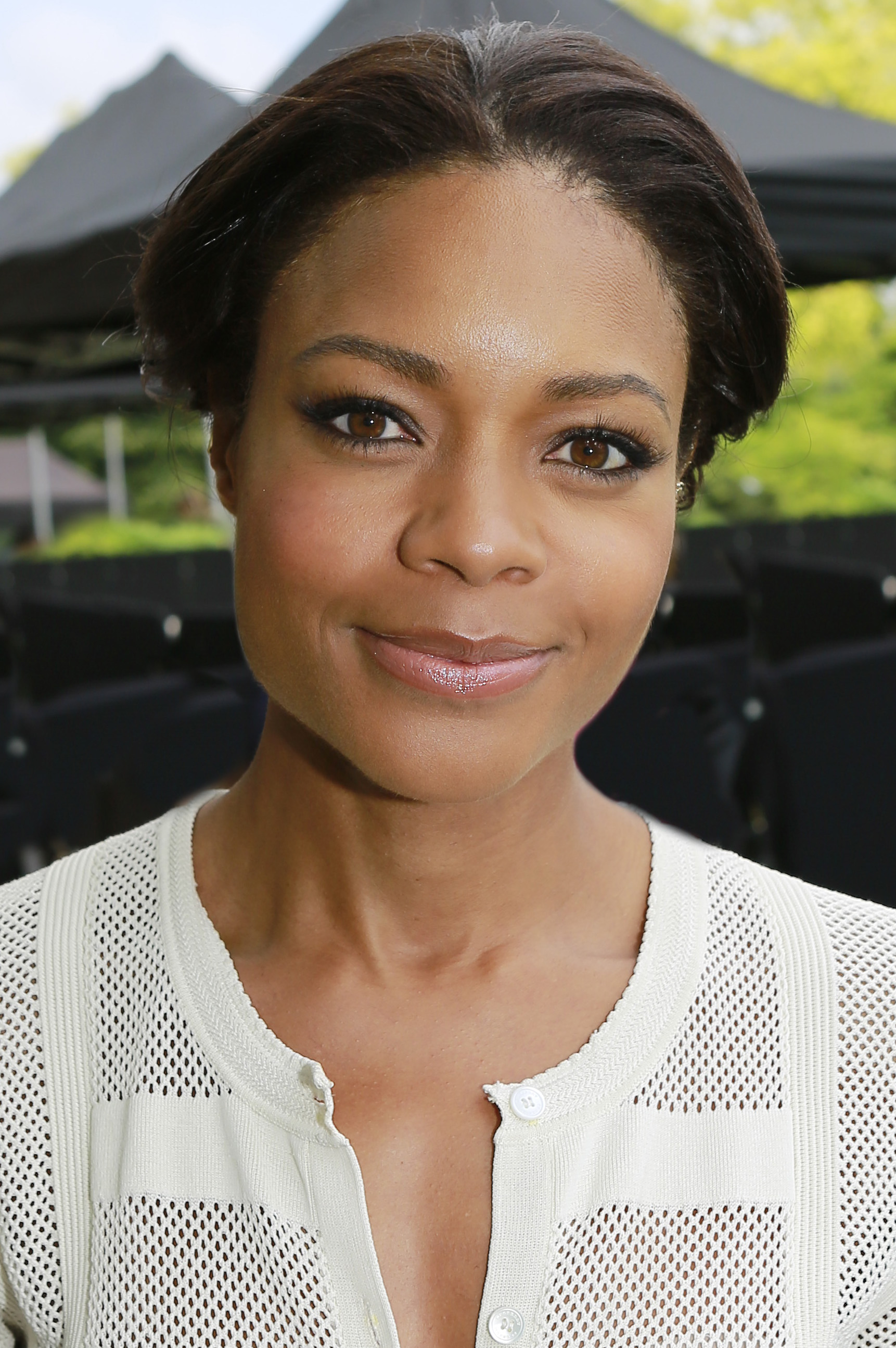
Naomie Harris, British actress

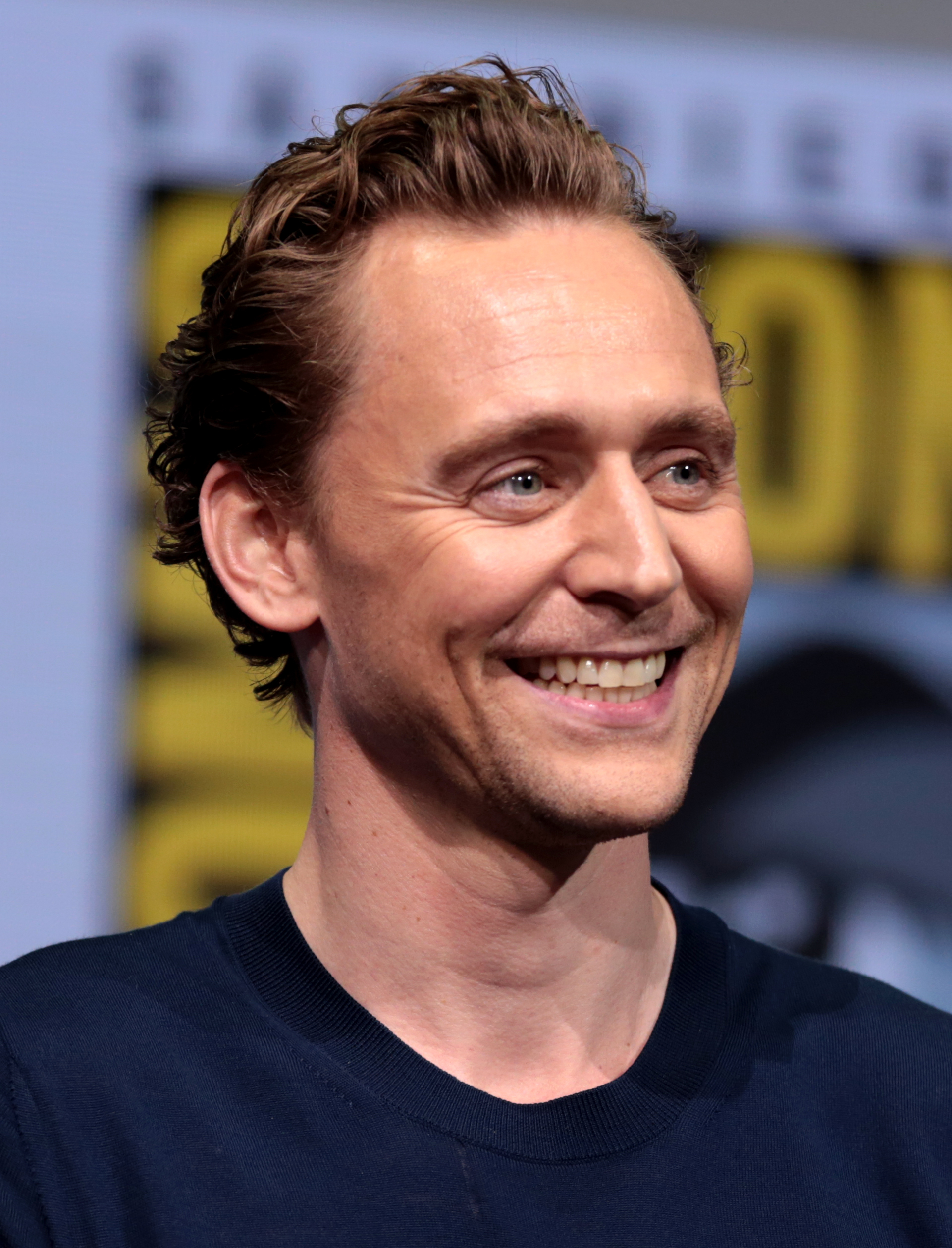
Tom Hiddleston, British actor

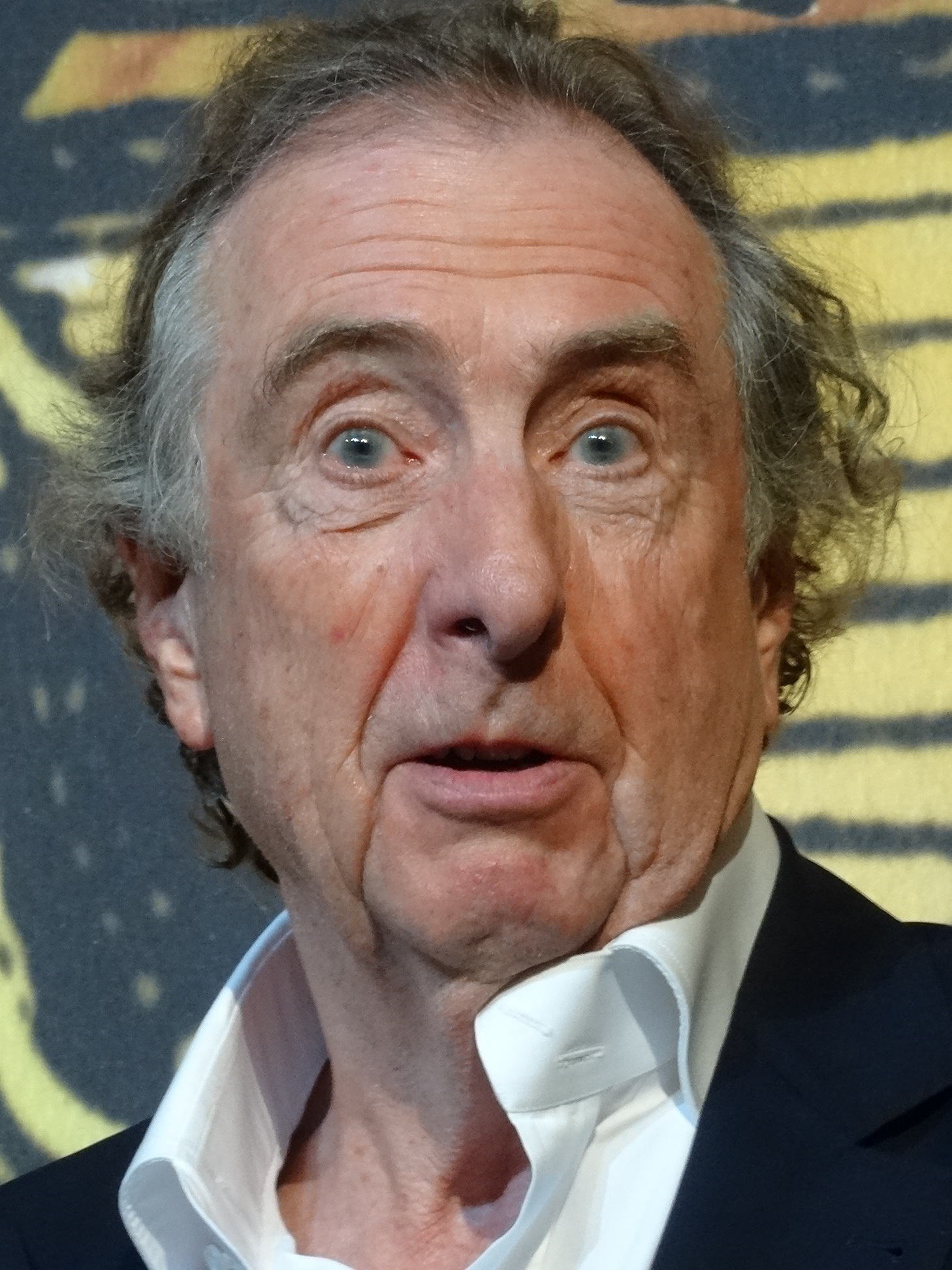
Eric Idle, British comedian and writer, Monty Python member

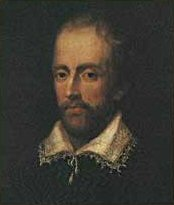
Edmund Spenser, the Elizabethan poet remembered for his epic poem The Faerie Queene
- Robert Bathurst, Actor
- Richard Beard, Novelist and non-fiction writer
- Richard Berengarten, Poet
- Peter Bradshaw, Author and film critic
- Tim Brooke-Taylor, Comedian, member of The Goodies
- Marcus Buckingham, author and motivational speaker
- Peter Cook, Comedian
- Ralph Cusack, Painter, stage designer, horticulturist and writer.
- Seamus Deane, Novelist, poet and literary critic
- Rick Edwards, Television presenter
- Thomas Gray, Poet
- Stephen Greenblatt, Literary critic, pioneer of New Historicism
- Bendor Grosvenor, Art historian
- Malcolm Guite, Poet and author (Sounding the Seasons, The Singing Bowl), priest, singer-songwriter, currently Bye-Fellow and Chaplain of Girton College, Cambridge
- Robert Hardman, Journalist and author
- Naomie Harris, Actress
- Tom Hiddleston, Actor
- Philip Hinchcliffe, Television producer
- Ted Hughes, Poet
- Eric Idle, Comedian, member of Monty Python
- Clive James, Critic, journalist and broadcaster
- Peter Jeffrey, Actor
- Humphrey Jennings, Film-maker
- Emma Johnson, Clarinettist
- Anna Lapwood, Organist, conductor and broadcaster
- Robert Macfarlane, Writer
- Tom Morris, Theatre director and producer
- David Munrow, Musician, composer, music historian
- Richard Murdoch, Actor, comedian
- Bill Oddie, Comedian, member of The Goodies, ornithologist
- Martin Rowson, Cartoonist
- Tom Sharpe, Novelist
- Indra Sinha, Novelist
- Christopher Smart, Poet, hymnist, journalist, actor
- Edmund Spenser, Poet
- Peter Taylor, Author and journalist
- Karan Thapar, Writer, journalist, broadcaster, editor
- Ed Yong, Science journalist and author

== Clergy ==
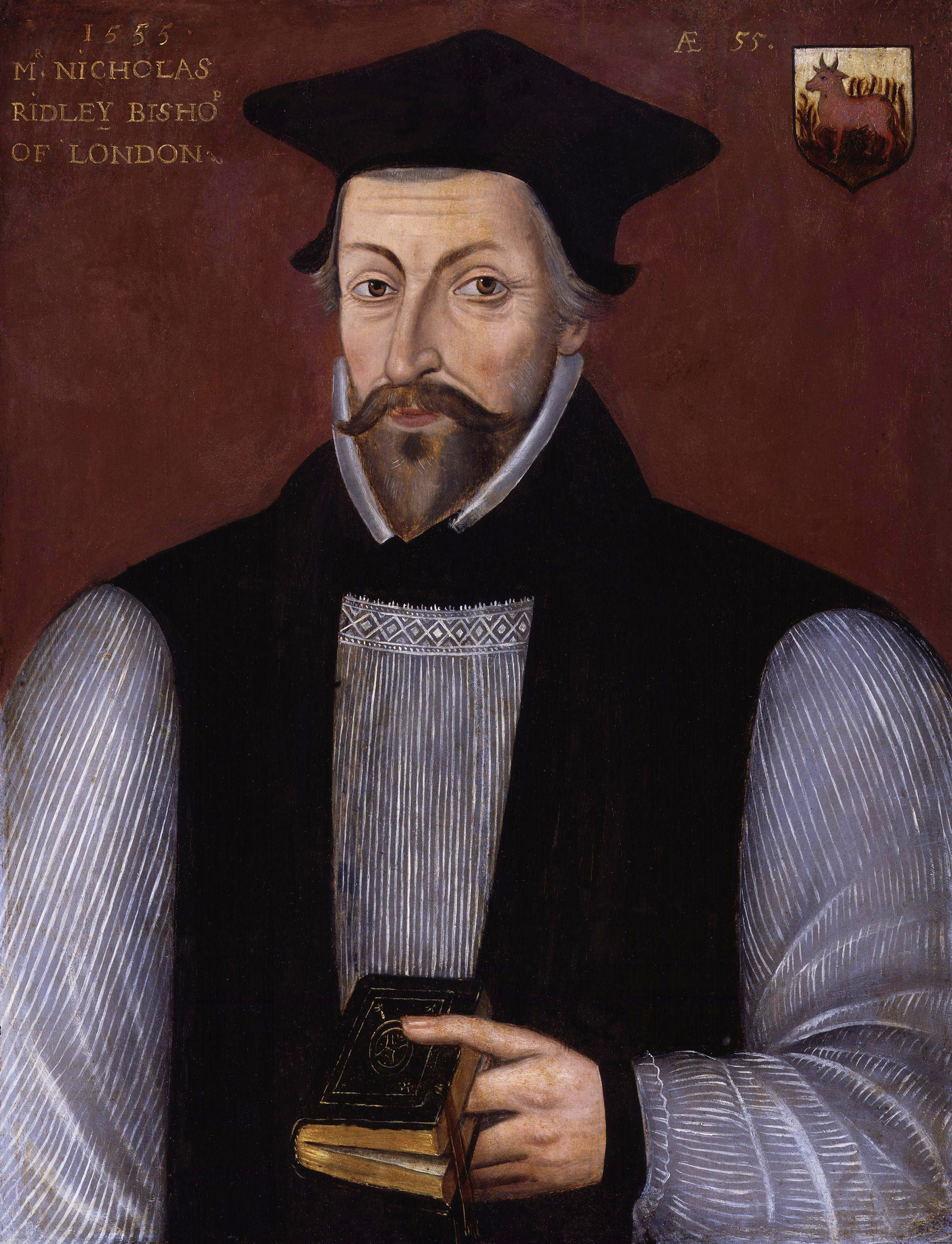
Nicholas Ridley, English Protestant cleric and martyr

- Lancelot Andrewes, Master; Dean of Westminster; Bishop of Chichester, Ely, Winchester; leading member of the translation committee which produced the King James Bible
- C.F. Andrews, Priest and activist for the Indian independence movement
- William Burkitt, New Testament commentator, vicar and lecturer of Dedham, Essex
- Richard Crashaw, Anglican cleric and later Catholic convert, poet associated with Metaphysical poets and religious poetry, Fellow of Peterhouse, Cambridge
- William Crashaw, Appointed preacher at the Inner Temple, Anglican divine and poet, author of anti-Catholic tracts and pamphlets
- Timothy Dudley-Smith, Hymn writer and clergyman of the Church of England
- Edmund Grindal, Archbishop of Canterbury, Archbishop of York, Bishop of London
- Nicholas Ridley, Bishop of London, Martyr

== Politicians and public servants ==
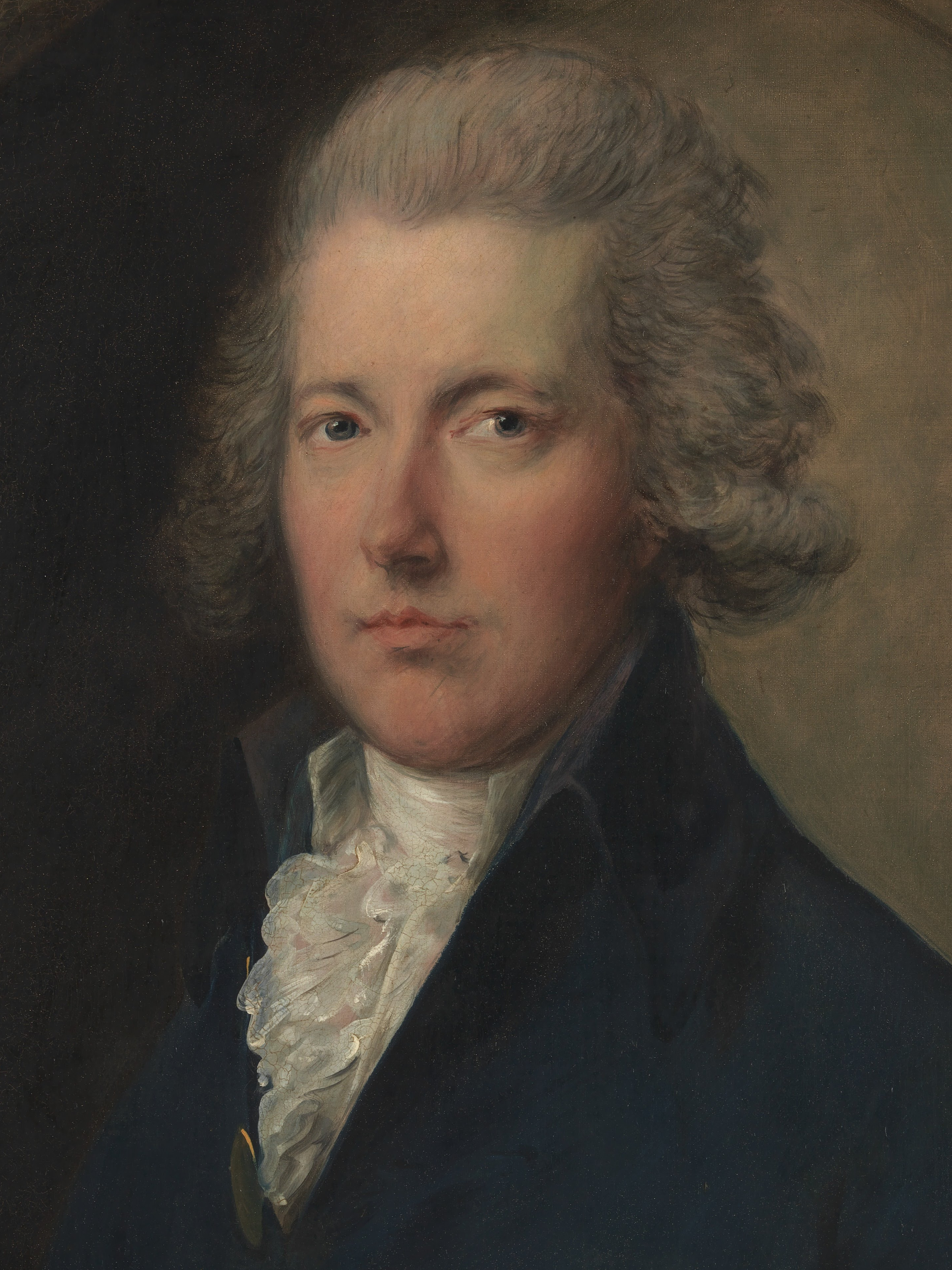
William Pitt the Younger, the youngest ever British Prime Minister

- Tim Allan, Downing Street Director of Communications 2025–2026
- Clive Betts, British politician
- Vicky Bowman, former British Ambassador
- Rab Butler, British politician; served as Chancellor of the Exchequer, Foreign Secretary, Home Secretary and Deputy Prime Minister
- Jo Cox, British aid worker and politician
- Abba Eban, Statesman; President of the Weizmann Institute of Science
- Edward James Eliot, British politician
- William Eliot, 2nd Earl of St Germans, British politician
- Femi Fani-Kayode, Former Nigerian Minister of Culture and Tourism
- Roger W. Ferguson Jr., Economist, Vice Chairman of the U.S. Federal Reserve System, President and CEO of TIAA, Honorary Fellow
- Alexander Grantham, Governor of Fiji, later Governor of Hong Kong
- Rupert Gwynne, Member of Parliament (MP) for Eastbourne 1910–1924
- Oliver Heald, British politician
- Atma Jayaram, Former Director of the Indian Intelligence Bureau
- Simon McDonald, Baron McDonald of Salford, Diplomat, Head of the British Diplomatic Service
- William Pitt the Younger, British politician; Prime Minister 1783–1801, 1804–06
- George Maxwell Richards, President of Trinidad and Tobago
- Chris Smith, Baron Smith of Finsbury, British politician; current Master
- P. K. van der Byl, Rhodesian politician
- Roger Williams, Statesman, theologian, founder of Rhode Island

== Sportspeople ==
- Archibald Fargus, Cricketer, scholar, clergyman
- Arthur Gilligan, England cricket captain
- David MacMyn, Rugby union international (Scotland and Lions) player and administrator
- Peter May, Cricketer
- Wavell Wakefield, 1st Baron Wakefield of Kendal, Rugby player and politician

== Others ==
- Roger Bushell, Leader of "The Great Escape"
- Ray Dolby, Inventor who bequeathed US$52.6 million to Pembroke
- C. H. Douglas, Engineer; pioneer of the Social Credit movement
- Sir Allan Mossop, Chief Judge of the British Supreme Court for China
- Quintin Riley, Arctic explorer
- Hugh Ruttledge, Mountaineer
- Peter Taylor, Baron Taylor of Gosforth, Lord Chief Justice
- David White, Garter Principal King of Arms
