= Charles Wells (brewer) =

British brewer (1842–1914)

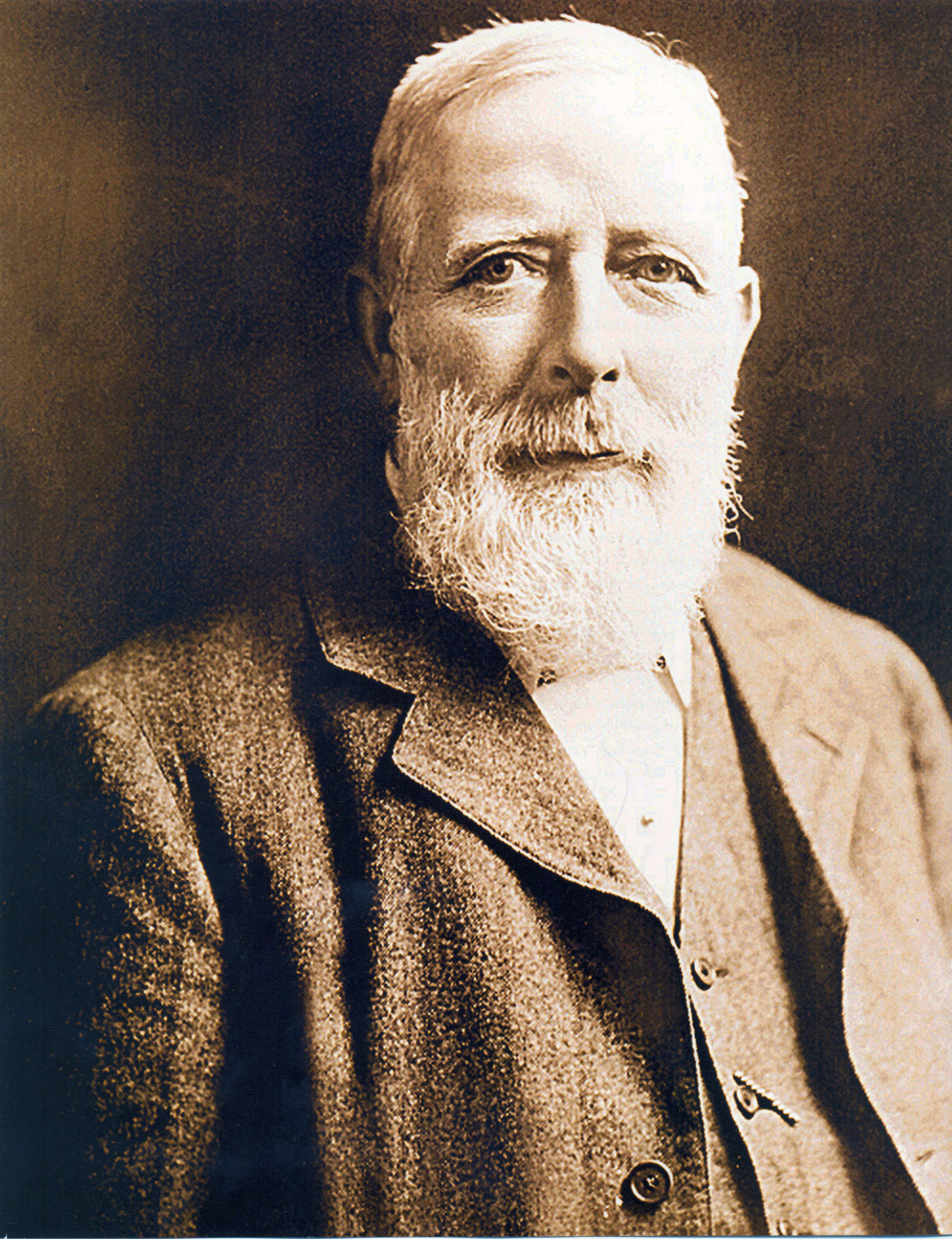
- Born: 16 August 1842
- Died: 1 April 1914 (aged 71); Bedford, England
- Known for: Founder of Charles Wells Ltd; Progenitor of the Wells Baronets

Captain Charles Wells (16 August 1842 – 1 April 1914) was the British founder of Charles Wells Ltd, which became the largest privately owned brewery in the United Kingdom, and the progenitor of the Wells Baronets of Felmersham.

== Life ==
Wells was born on 16 August 1842, the second son of George Wells, a cabinetmaker. He left Bedford Modern School at the age of fourteen and went to sea, ‘signing up with the shipping company Wigrams as a midshipman on the frigate Devonshire’. Wells was made a captain on 16 December 1868 and offered command of Wigrams's first steamship.

While on leave in the early 1870s, Wells became engaged to Josephine Grimbly of Banbury, Oxfordshire. Josephine's father, although in favour of the match, said that ‘Charles Wells must leave the sea and find a new and less dangerous career’. In 1872 Charles and Josephine married; they had five sons (one of whom, Richard Wells, was created a baronet) and three daughters.

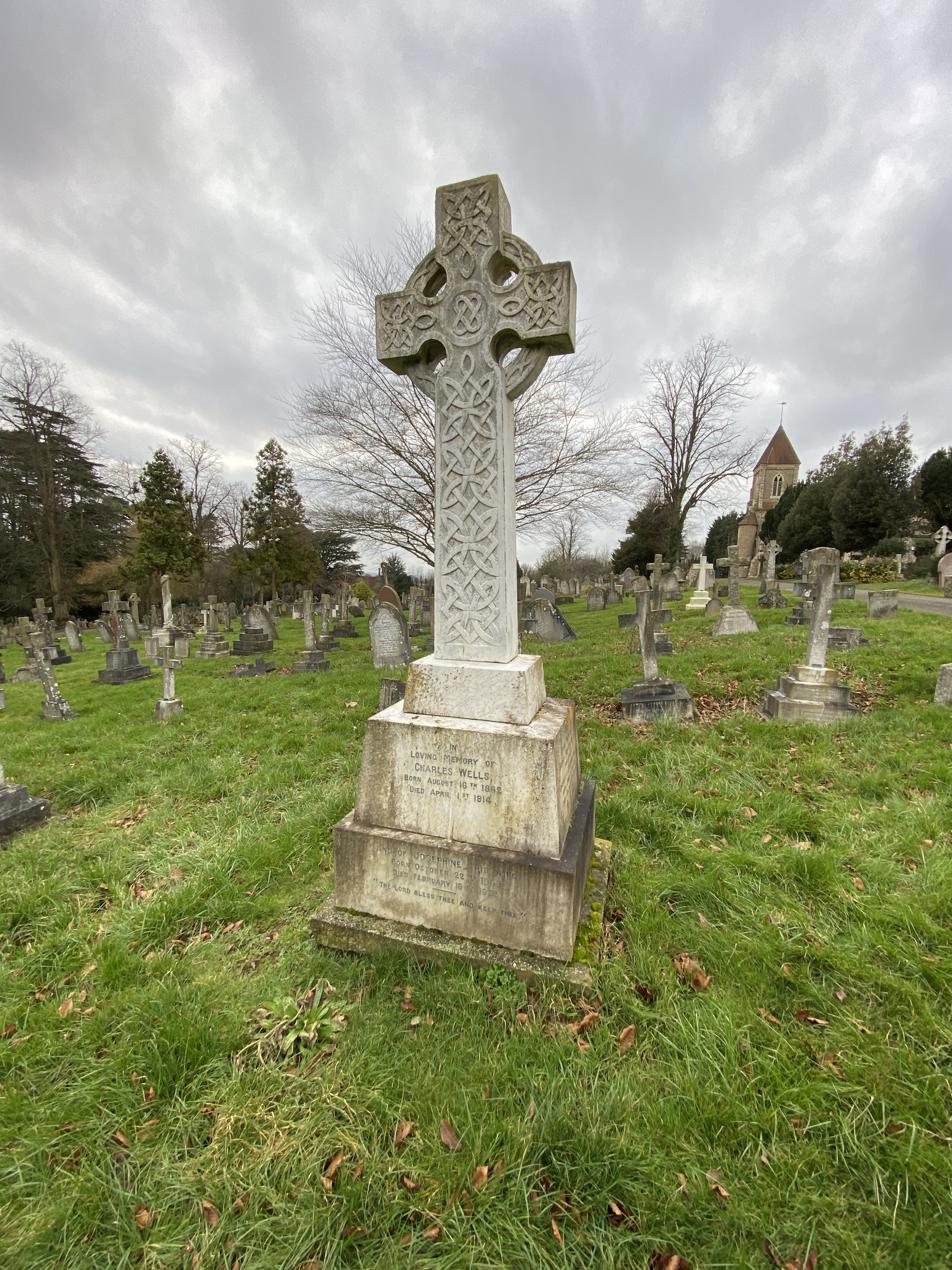
The grave of Charles Wells, at Foster Hill Cemetery, Bedford.

In 1876, Wells became a brewer when he took over a coal wharf, a malt house and brewery in Horne Lane, Bedford, and thirty five public houses, sold to him at public auction in December 1875. He subsequently sold off the coal business.

In 1903, Wells became a member of Bedford Borough Council, which he served until 1909. Four of Charles's sons became partners in the brewery on condition that they live in Wells's native town of Bedford. In 1910, the business was registered as a private limited company, valued at £150,000 and owning 140 pubs.

Charles Wells died in Bedford on 1 April 1914. He is buried at the Foster Hill Cemetery, a few metres east of the chapel.
