= Radwell =

Radwell may refer to:

- Radwell, Bedfordshire
- Radwell, Hertfordshire
