= Church of St Mary, Felmersham =

Church in Bedfordshire, England

St Mary's Church
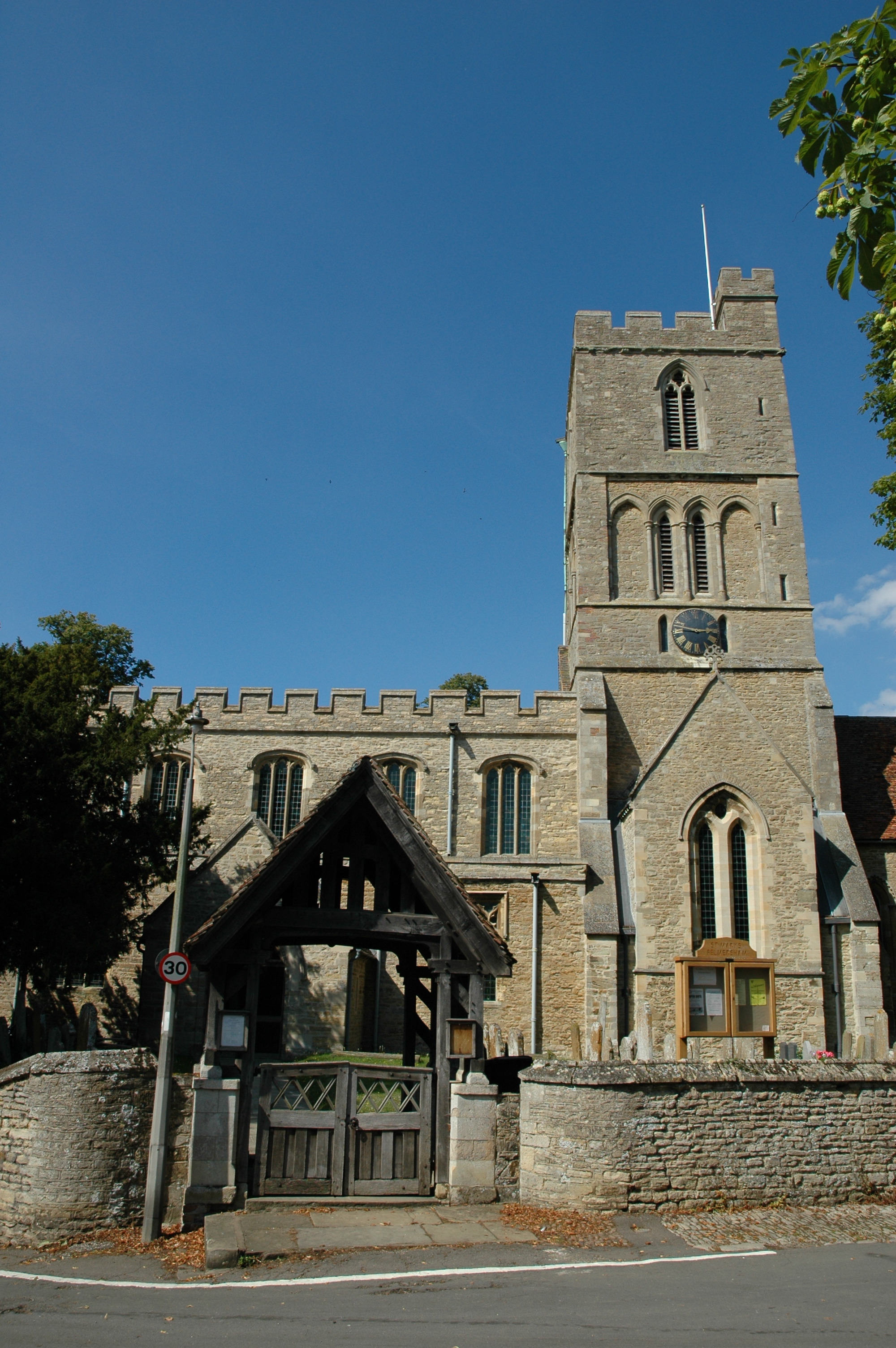
- St Mary's Church
- 52.2099°N 0.5505°W
- Location: Felmersham
- Country: England
- Denomination: Church of England

Administration
- Province: Canterbury
- Diocese: Ely

Clergy
- Vicar: Paolo Di Leo

The Church of St. Mary the Virgin or St. Mary's Church is a Grade I listed church in Felmersham, Bedfordshire, England. The church was founded in the early 13th century as a dependent church of Lenton Priory in Nottinghamshire. Renovations were made in the 14th and 15th centuries, but much of the original 13th-century structure remains. St Mary's Church is regarded as a well-preserved example of Early English architecture. The layout of the building follows a traditional cruciform plan of chancel, central tower, transepts, aisled nave and south porch. The rood screen, dating to the early 15th century and retaining traces of its original paint is in the Perpendicular Gothic style.

== Location ==
St. Mary's parish church is located on a raised site overlooking the River Ouse in Felmersham, Bedfordshire, England. The old vicarage, built of limestone rubble, is now a private residence. The church serves the villages of Felmersham and Radwell.

== Description ==
The church was built between 1220 and 1240 AD using limestone rubble masonry and ashlar dressings. It is regarded as a notable example of Early English architecture. The building follows a traditional cruciform plan comprising a chancel, central tower, transepts, aisled nave, and south porch. The west front is considered its most important architectural feature. The four-bay nave includes a 13th-century arcade and 15th-century clerestory windows. Its pillars alternate between round and octagonal forms, a characteristic of Early English Gothic design. The three-bay chancel is unusually long and contains lancet windows added during a 19th-century restoration. It also houses a rare example of an Early English double piscina.

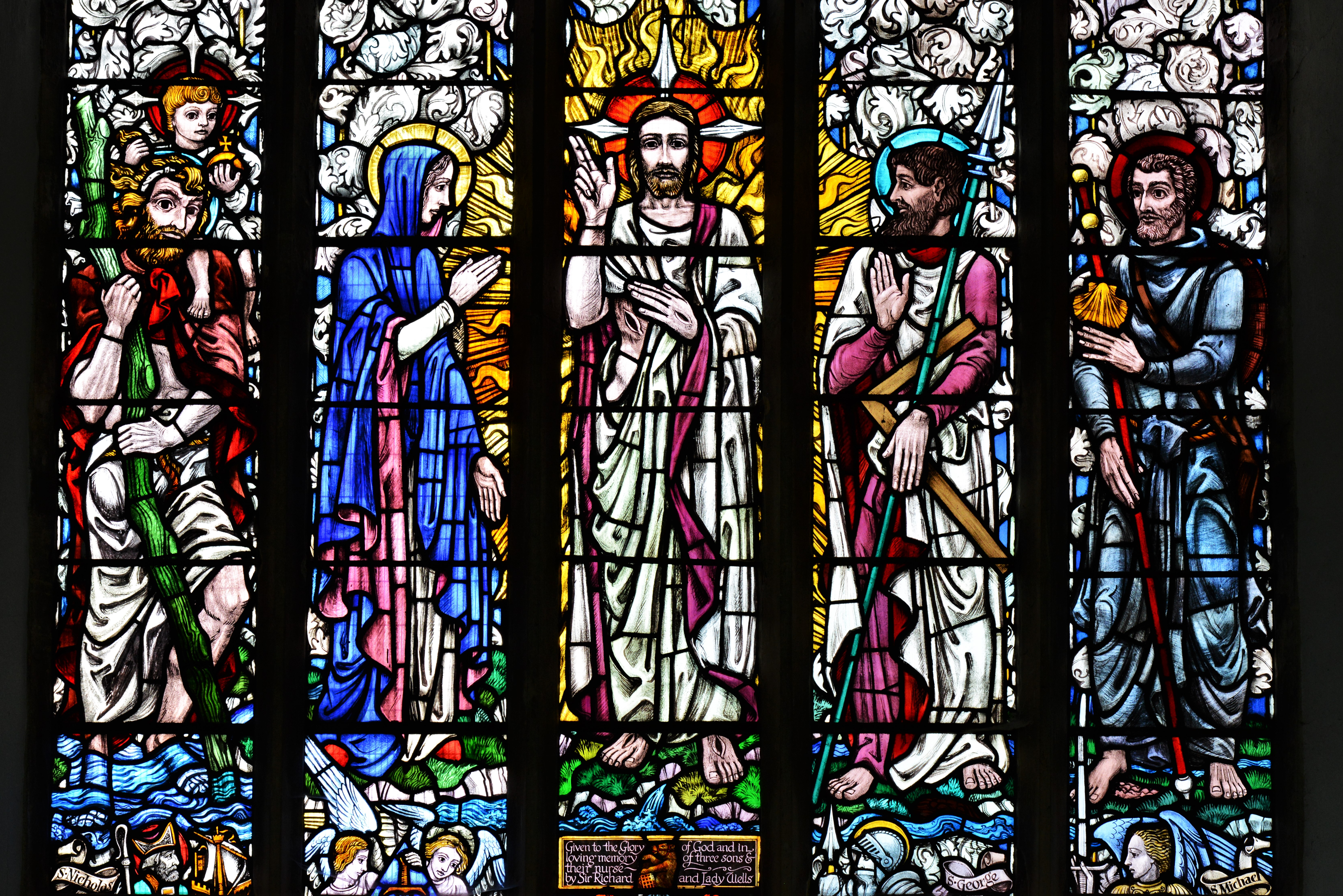
East window, World War II memorial

A medieval oak rood screen separates the chancel from the choir. The screen, dating to the early 15th century and retaining its original paint, is in the Perpendicular Gothic style. A large organ, built in 1873, occupies the north transept. The transept includes a door on its south-east wall which leads to the tower staircase.

The East window is a modern insertion with five lights and reticulated tracery, set in original 13th-century jambs. It serves as a memorial donated by Sir Richard and Lady Wells of Felmersham Grange, commemorating their three sons—Christopher, James, and Thomas—who were killed during the Second World War, as well as their longtime nurse of thirty years, Beatrice Mary Chapman.

The tower, constructed in three stages, rises above the surrounding roofs. The original 13th century tower had two stages: a short foundation stage, which has two lancet windows each on the north, south and west sides; and a second stage, which has two three bay arcades and lancet windows on the north and south sides. The third and highest stage, built in the 15th century, sits below an embattled parapet and south-east turret. This stage also has trefoiled two-light windows. The south door retains its original sanctuary ring, which in the medieval period, granted the right of asylum to anybody who touched it.

== History ==
The original church was built between 1220 AD and 1240 AD as a monastic outpost of Lenton Priory in Nottinghamshire. Renovations were made in the 14th and 15th centuries, but most of the original layout and fabric remains. During the 14th century, the south wall of the south aisle was reconstructed, the tower was raised, and a clerestory was added to the nave. In the 15th century, several new windows were added, replacing original windows. In 1853, lancet windows replaced the original large gothic-style windows. The original wooden pulpit was replaced in 1895 by one made in stone. St. Mary's Church became a listed building on 13 July 1964.

== Gallery ==
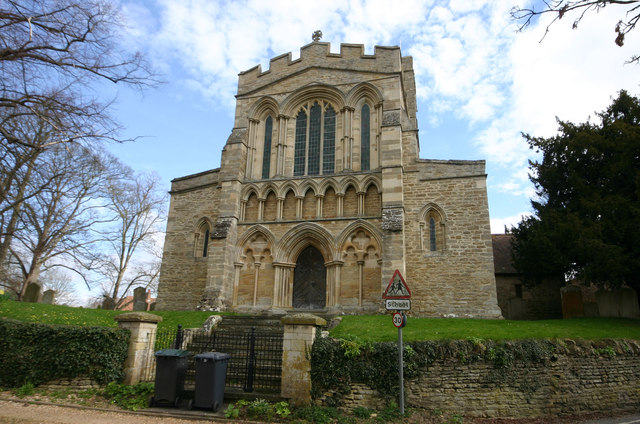
West Front, St. Mary's

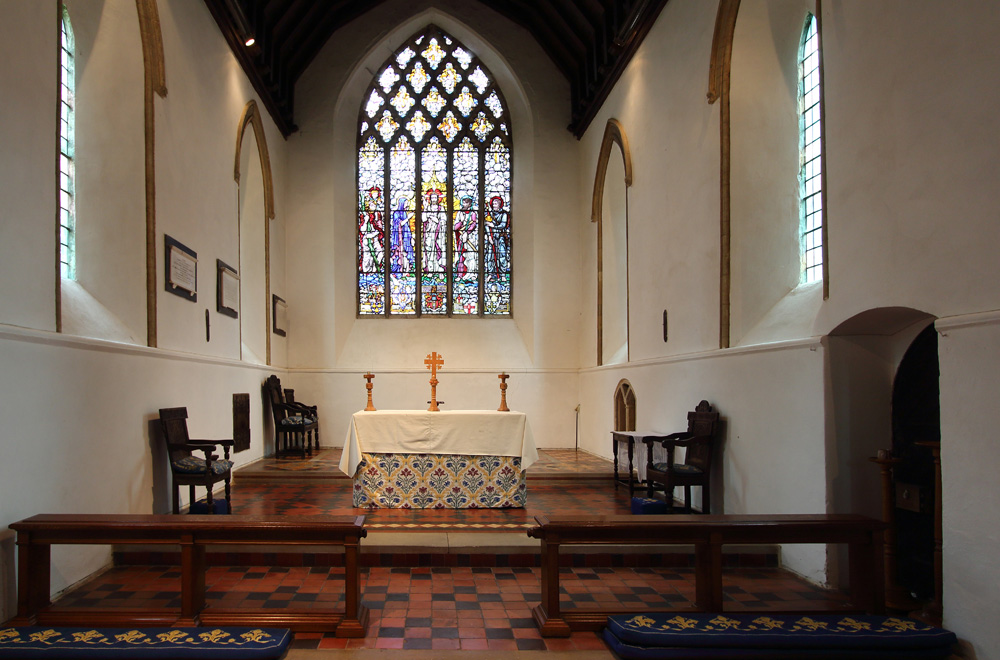
Sanctuary, St. Mary's church

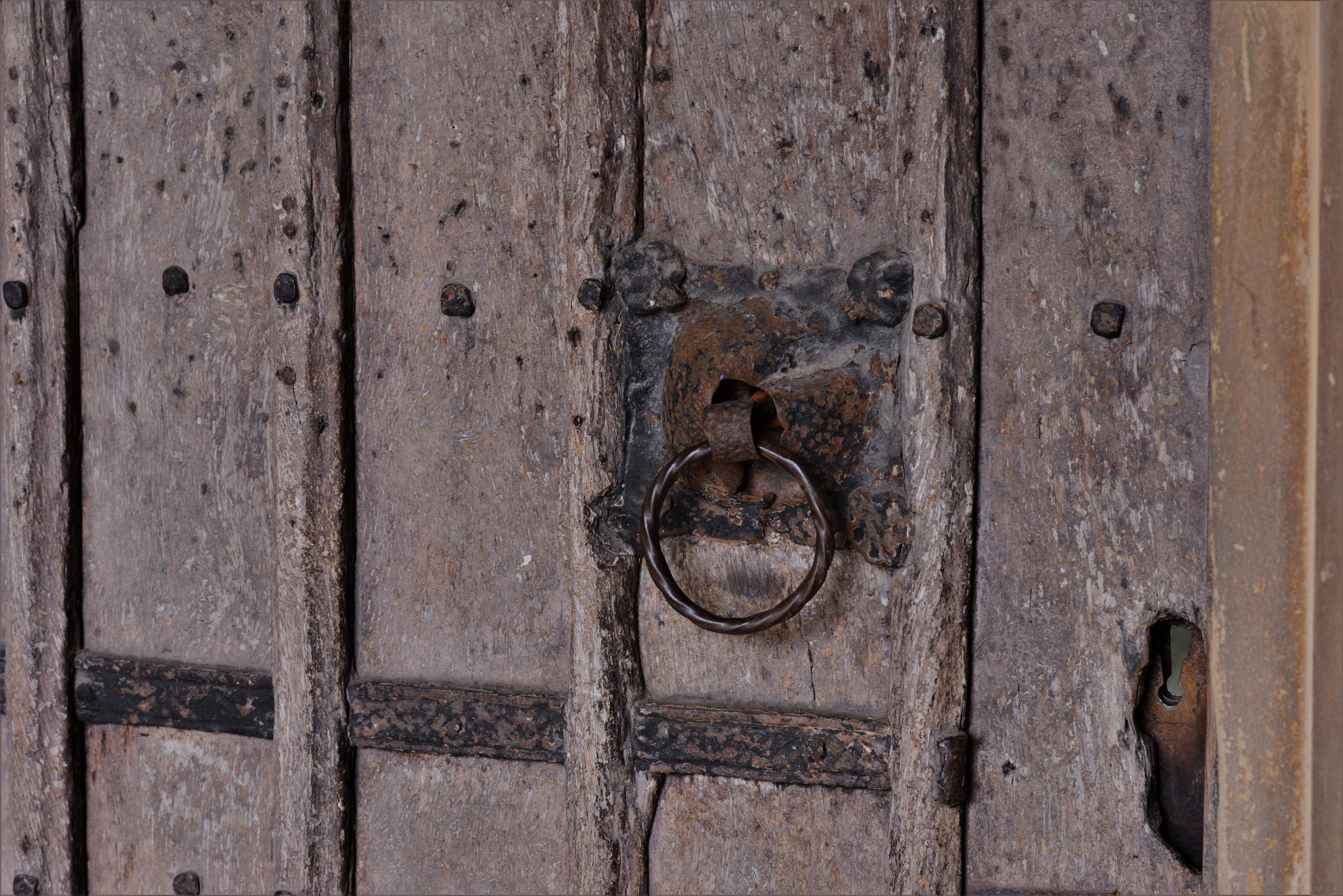
Ancient south door

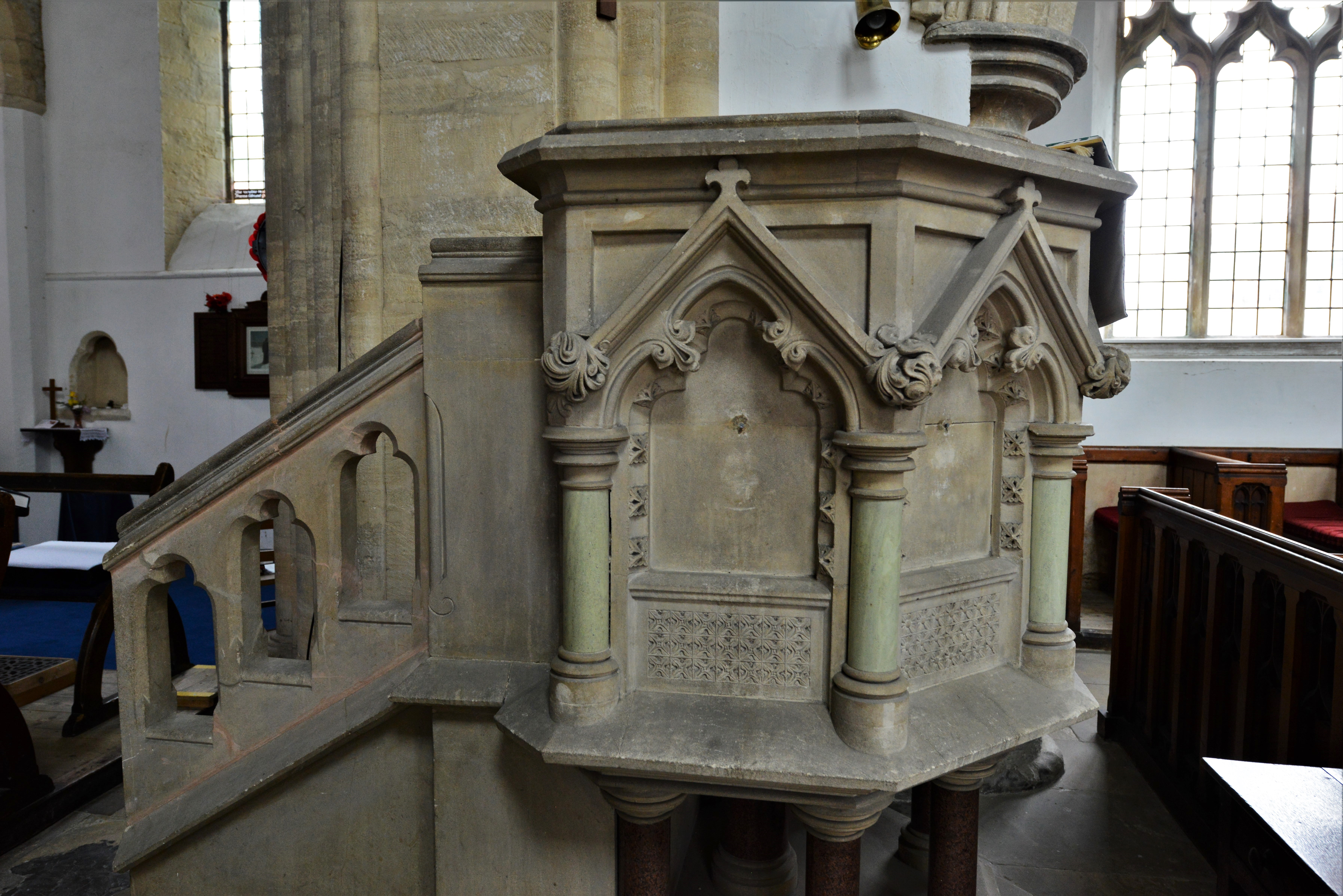
19th century stone pulpit

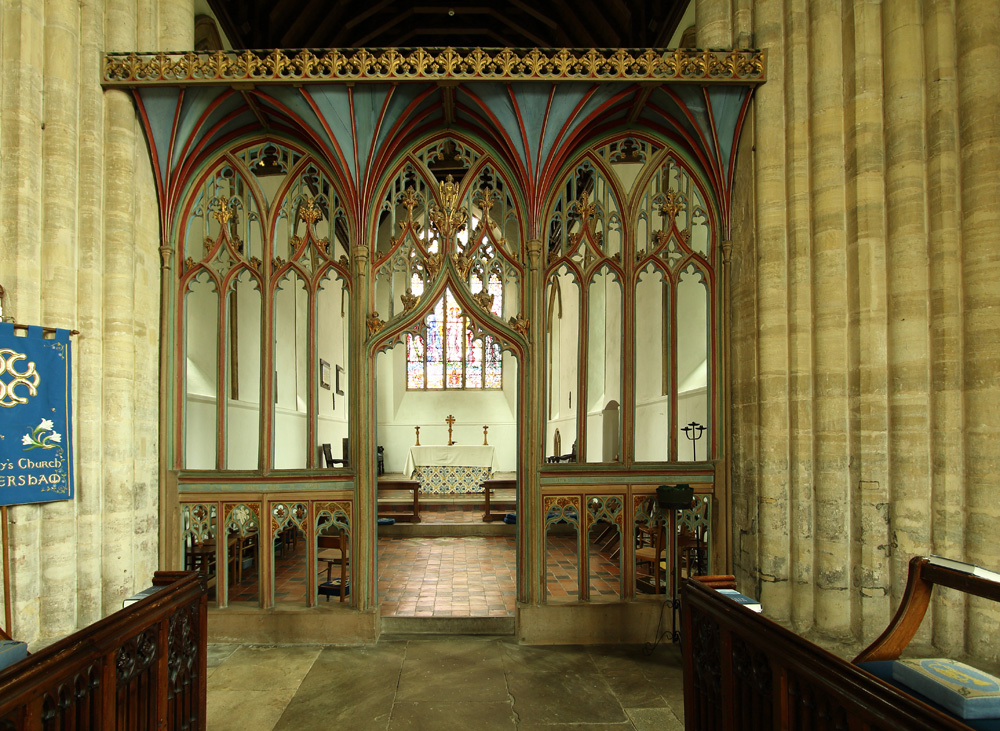
15th century rood screen

== See also ==
- Grade I listed buildings in Bedfordshire
