= Wells baronets of Felmersham (1944) =

The Wells baronetcy of Felmersham in the County of Bedford, was created in the Baronetage of the United Kingdom on 21 January 1944 for Richard Wells, who represented Bedford in the House of Commons from 1922 to 1945.

== Wells baronets, of Felmersham (1944) ==
- Sir (Sydney) Richard Wells, 1st Baronet (1879–1956)
- Sir Charles Maltby Wells, 2nd Baronet (1908–1996).
- Sir Christopher Charles Wells, 3rd Baronet (born 1936)

The heir apparent is the present holder's son Michael Christopher Gruffydd Wells (born 1966).
