= Radwell Manor Railway =

Miniature railway in Bedfordshire, England

Coordinates: 52.2105°N 0.5290°W

The Radwell Manor Railway was a 10 1/4 in (260 mm) gauge miniature railway situated in the village of Radwell, near Felmersham, in North Bedfordshire, England. It was built by Mr. H. W. Franklin, who was closely associated with the Bassett-Lowke company of Northampton, and whose products were often tested on its 0.75 mi (1.2 km) of track. The privately run railway opened in 1920, and ceased operating with the onset of the Second World War, around 1939. However, much of the railway remained intact until at least the early 1960s because it was seen in approximately 1960-1962 by a young railway enthusiast who was exploring the area.

== Layout ==
According to Wenman Joseph Bassett-Lowke, the RMR had a length of "all but 0.75 miles (1.2 km), and among its attractions are an up-to-date station, a tunnel, viaducts, embankments and cuttings ... and several over-bridges, together with a complete system of signalling."

The main viaduct was 65 feet (19.8 m) long, with four 16-foot (4.88 m) spans, and the embankment supporting it was 7 ft 8 in (2.34 m) high The trackwork consisted of 13 1/2 lb/yd (6.7 kg/m) flat-bottom rail in 16 ft 6 in (5.03 m) lengths, supported on steel sleepers.

Other features included sidings, engine and carriage sheds, a water tower and a turntable.

== Steam locomotives ==
=== Loadstone ===
An adaptation of a Raven design of three-cylinder Atlantic, as ran on the North Eastern Railway. It had 2.625 in × 4.5 in (66.7 mm × 114.3 mm) cylinders, 11.5-inch (292.1 mm) driving wheels, a working pressure of 100 lbf/in^{2} (689 kPa), an overall length (engine and tender) of 11 feet 9 inches (3.58 m), and a working weight of 15 long cwt (760 kg). It could achieve a speed of 25 mph (40 km/h).

=== Highland Mary ===
A 4-4-0 design. She had cylinders of 2.875 in × 4.75 in (73.0 mm × 120.7 mm), driving wheels of 12.5 inches (317.5 mm), a working pressure of 120 lbf/in^{2} (827 kPa), and an overall length (engine and tender) of 8 feet 6 inches (2.59 m).

== See also ==
- For other 10 1/4 in (260 mm) miniature railways, see Ridable miniature railway.

== Sources ==
- Bassett-Lowke, Wenman Joseph (1947). The Model Railway Handbook (13th ed.). Northampton, UK: Bassett-Lowke Ltd.
- "The Radwell Manor Railway". Railway Reflections. 11. Dunstable, UK: Railway Reflections, Ltd. July–August 1982.
- Bassett-Lowke, Janet (1999). Wenman Joseph Bassett-Lowke. Chester, UK: Rail Romances. ISBN 1-900622-01-7.
- "Felmersham Village History".
