= George Crichton Wells =

British dermatologist

George Crichton Wells FRCP
- Born: 13 July 1914; Bedford, Bedfordshire, England
- Died: 16 January 1999 (aged 84); Waveney District, Suffolk, England
- Education: Bedford School; Pembroke College, Cambridge
- Known for: Wells' Syndrome
- Medical career
- Profession: physician
- Field: dermatologist
- Institutions: St Thomas' Hospital, St John’s Hospital for Diseases of the Skin
- Military career
- Allegiance: United Kingdom
- Branch: British Army
- Rank: Major
- Unit: Royal Army Medical Corps

George Crichton Wells FRCP (13 July 1914 – 16 January 1999) was a dermatologist at St Thomas' Hospital and St John’s Hospital for Diseases of the Skin (now closed). He was the son of Sir Richard Wells, 1st Baronet, the brother of Sir Charles Wells, 2nd Baronet, and he gave his name to Wells' syndrome.

== Career ==
Following a scholarship to Pembroke College, Cambridge, he went to St Thomas' Hospital to continue his clinical studies and qualified in 1939. He prematurely attempted and failed his Membership of the Royal College of Physicians (MRCP). After a spell at the Royal Army Medical Corps depot at Church Crookham as a major he found himself in unfulfilling, general duties. Volunteering to be a paratrooper he quickly found himself active in war theatres in Tunisia, Sicily, Greece and France during World War II. His medical experience was broadened by the range of injuries he had to treat.

At the end of the war he returned to St Thomas' Hospital where he achieved his MRCP in 1946 and was appointed registrar to Owen de Wesselow’s medical unit. This post provided an insight into academic medicine but Wells did not enjoy it. At this time dermatology was becoming a prestigious speciality and Wells gained a post working in Chicago University medical school with Stephen Rothman who was developing a dermatology department. Wells decide to stay one extra year as he felt inspired by the stimulating environment. Rothman offered him a permanent post but Wells returned home after the second year. Rothman knew W. N. Goldsmith in charge of dermatology at University College Hospital having worked and become friends with him in Wrocław and with his recommendation Wells was interviewed and appointed senior registrar to Goldsmith. However Wells found the post unfulfilling and returned to Chicago with his new wife. He worked again with Goldman as an assistant professor researching connective tissue ground substance, work that was to form a chapter in Rothman's book Physiology and Biochemistry of the Skin (Chicago, University of Chicago Press, 1954). That year Wells and his wife returned to England.

The Institute of Dermatology was developing at St John's Hospital and Wells was appointed as a senior lecturer in 1954. He quickly set up his laboratory in Lisle Street. In 1959 Wells gained his Fellowship of the Royal College of Physicians and in the same year was appointed Director of the Institute of Dermatology at St John's Hospital and he then accepted a consultancy at St Thomas' Hospital, sharing his time between the two. This arrangement seemed to suit Wells; he was a shy man able to find comfort working in the relative calmness of his laboratory.

In 1961, he gave the Parkes Weber lecture at the College of Physicians, "Skin disorders Associated with Malabsorption", based on work he had done at St Thomas' Hospital with gastroenterologists and later published in the British Medical Journal. Wells wrote, together with Geoffrey Dowling, the skin section in many editions of Conybeare's Textbook of Medicine. George Wells' name is associated with the rare condition eosinophilic cellulitis (Wells' syndrome) after he first described it: a patchy inflammatory condition of the skin characterised by what he called "flame figures" from the shapes of the inflamed patches on the skin.

== Personal life ==
George Wells was the fifth of nine children of Sir Richard Wells, 1st Baronet, and Mary Dorothy Maltby. He was educated at Bedford School and gained a scholarship to Cambridge. At university he excelled at rugby, swimming, diving and rowing.

In World War II, the family was nicknamed "The Fighting Wellses of Felmersham". All seven brothers served in the armed forces, as did their younger sister Sarah, who was a leading Wren. Their elder sister, Sydney, was married to a Royal Navy officer. Three of the brothers were killed in action.

Wells married Margaret Bruce in 1951. They had no children. The couple lived in Hereford Square in South Kensington, London, and on his retirement they moved to Suffolk. Wells was musical and enjoyed playing the Spanish guitar. Margaret predeceased her husband by six weeks.
