= Felmersham Gravel Pits =

Nature reserve in Bedfordshire, United Kingdom

Coordinates: 52.215353°N 0.550178°W

- Site of Special Scientific Interest
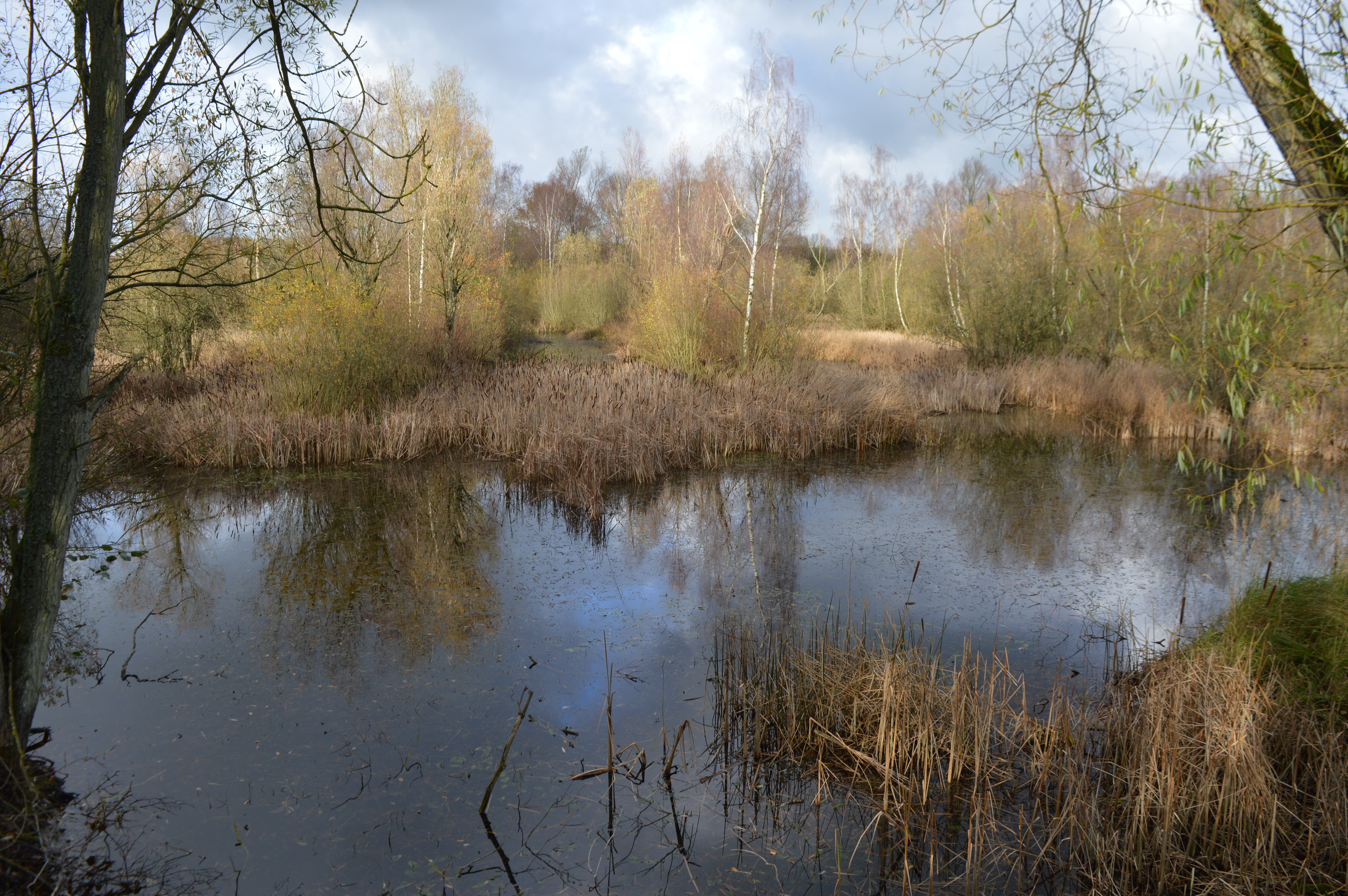
- Location of Felmersham Gravel Pits.
- Area of search: Bedfordshire
- Grid reference: SP 991584
- Interest: Biological
- Area: 21.6 ha (53 acres)
- Notification date: 1986
- Location map: Magic Map

Felmersham Gravel Pits is a 21.6-hectare (53-acre) Site of Special Scientific Interest between the villages of Felmersham and Sharnbrook in Bedfordshire. It was notified under Section 28 of the Wildlife and Countryside Act 1981 in 1986 and the local planning authority is Bedford Borough Council. The site is managed by the Wildlife Trust for Bedfordshire, Cambridgeshire and Northamptonshire.

The site has flooded gravel pits which were worked until about 1945. Other habitats are neutral grassland, scrub and broadleaved woodland. It is one of the best sites in Bedfordshire for dragonflies and damselflies.

The road called Causeway goes through the reserve, which is open at all times.
