= Sir Charles Wells, 2nd Baronet =

British Baronet

Sir Charles Maltby Wells, 2nd Baronet (1908 – 1996) was a British baronet, the second of the Wells baronets of Felmersham.

== Biography ==
Born on 24 July 1908, the eldest son of Sir Richard Wells, 1st Baronet (1879–1957), the Conservative Member of Parliament for Bedford, and the grandson of Charles Wells (1842–1914), founder of the brewery company Charles Wells Ltd, Sir Charles Maltby Wells was educated at Bedford School and at Pembroke College, Cambridge. He was the second of the Wells baronets of Felmersham, created on 21 January 1944, succeeding to the title on the death of his father on 26 November 1957. In the Second World War he served in the Royal Engineers and reached the rank of lieutenant colonel.

Sir Charles Maltby Wells died on 23 June 1996 and was succeeded by his son, Sir Christopher Charles Wells, 3rd Baronet (born 1936).

Baronetage of the United Kingdom
Preceded by Richard Wells	Baronet (of Felmersham); 1957–1996	Succeeded by Christopher Wells
