= John Arrowsmith (cartographer) =

English cartographer (1790–1873)

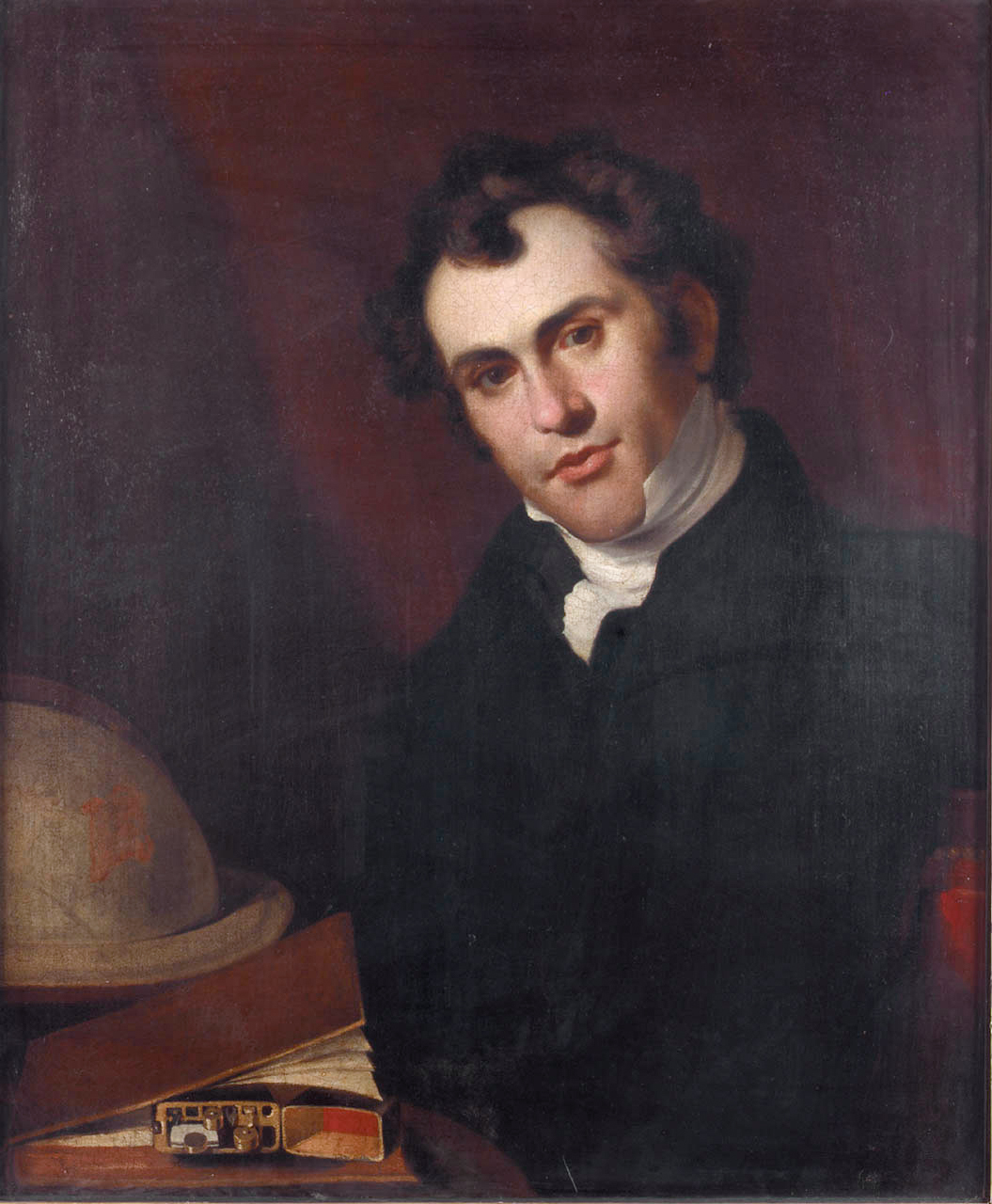
- John Arrowsmith
- Born: 1790; Winston, County Durham, England
- Died: 1 May 1873 (aged 82–83); Hereford Square, South Kensington, London
- Occupation: Cartographer

John Arrowsmith (1790–1873) was an English cartographer. He was born at Winston, County Durham, England. He was the nephew of Aaron Arrowsmith, another English cartographer.

In 1810 he joined his uncle in the cartography business. They built on Aaron's A map exhibiting all the new discoveries in the interior parts of North America 1811 version which was heavily based on information provided by the Hudson's Bay Company, Indian maps, and British Navy sea charts to produce and publish an updated map: North America in 1821. Their contributions to Canadian cartography led to Mount Arrowsmith, situated east of Port Alberni on Vancouver Island, British Columbia, being named for them.

Aaron's sons Aaron Jr. and Samuel were substantially younger than John but inherited their father's business when they were young men (21 and 18 respectively) when Aaron Sr. died in 1823. John took the £200 left to him by his uncle and began working on his own. Aaron Jr and Samuel did not have the skills of their father and cousin and their contributions to cartography were minimal. Regardless, the three Arrowsmiths were founding members of the Geographical Society of London in 1830. Aaron Jr. left the family firm in 1832, and upon the death of Samuel in 1839, John purchased the assets and merged them into his own business.

The Arrowsmith River in Western Australia was named by Sir George Grey after Arrowsmith, who later produced the maps for the published journals of Grey's two Western Australian expeditions. In 1863 he received the gold medal of the Royal Geographical Society, which was what the Geographical Society of London was known as after gaining the patronage of King William IV.

He died at home in Hereford Square, South Kensington, London on 1 May 1873.

== London Atlas of Universal Geography ==
Arrowsmith spent the years after his uncle's death preparing maps for his iconic London Atlas of Universal Geography, the first edition of which was published in 1834 with 50 maps. He likely planned to publish it in 1832, many of the maps within it have an 1832 publication year (subsequent editions have several maps within them that have earlier publication years than that of the atlas itself; Arrowsmith did not change the dates on the maps unless and until he updated them). He added and removed maps to the subsequent editions until there were 72 plates in one late edition. The atlas continued to be published after his death, the rights to publish the maps being acquired by Edward Stanford in 1874.

=== First edition (1834) of the London Atlas of Universal Geography (50 maps) ===
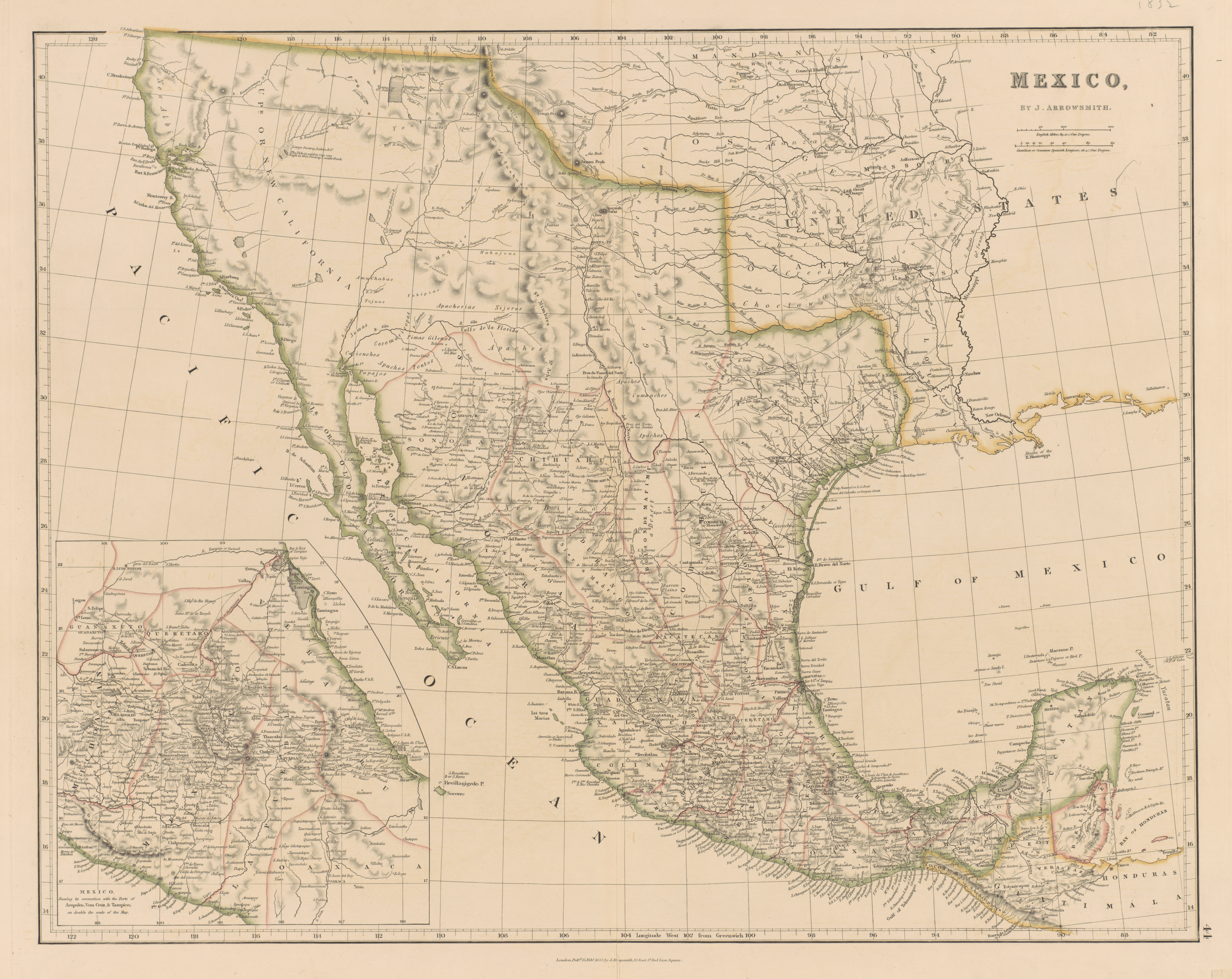
John Arrowsmith's 1832 map of Mexico

The 40 maps include the following (not a complete list; these maps were found in the David Rumsey map collection as included in Arrowsmith's 1838 Atlas. The Rumsey collection has digitized the maps in the 1838 and 1844 edition of the Atlas. Other editions of the atlas were published in 1834, 1835, 1839, 1840, 1842, 1859 and 1861.) :

- Orbis Veteribus Notus (Europe/Asia/Africa)
- World, Mercators projection
- Europe
- England
- Ireland
- Sweden & Norway
- Denmark (with Iceland)
- Belgium & Holland
- Western Germany
- Russia & Poland
- Austrian Empire
- Switzerland & the Passes of the Alps
- South Italy
- Turkey in Europe
- Greece & the Ionian Islands
- Spain & Portugal
- Nubia, Abyssinia
- Egypt
- Asia
- Turkey in Asia
- India
- Burmah, Siam, Cochin China
- China
- North Asia
- Asiatic Archipelago
- Pacific Ocean
- Mexico
- West Indies &
- Brazil
- British North America

=== Second edition (1835) of the London Atlas of Universal Geography (50 maps) ===
In addition to the maps published in 1832 in the above list, the 1835 atlas included the following (not a complete list):

Map with 1833 date:

- Discoveries in Western Australia

1834 Maps

- Inland navigation, rail roads, geology, minerals of England & Wales
- Scotland
- France
- Prussia & Poland
- North Italy, Alps, Apennines
- Africa
- Northwest Africa
- Central Asia
- Map of the discoveries in Australia
- Van Diemens Land
- United States
- South America
- Columbia
- Peru & Bolivia
- United Provinces of La Plata, Banda Oriental, Chile

=== Third edition (1838) of the London Atlas of Universal Geography (50-54 maps) ===
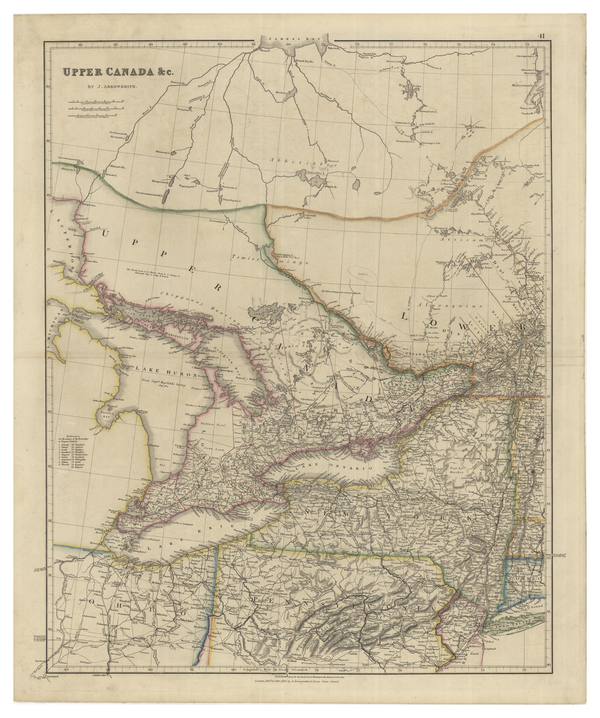
John Arrowsmith's 1837 map of Upper Canada

The first 1838 edition of the Atlas has the same maps as the 1835 edition, except for these maps that had been updated:

- America (1835)
- Cape of Good Hope (1835)
- Map of British North America (1837)
- Upper Canada (1837)
- Lower Canada (1837)

Later 1838 editions of the atlas than the one in the Rumsey collection replaced the following maps:

- Discoveries in Western Australia
- Discoveries in Australia

with

- The Colony of Western Australia
- The south eastern portion of Australia

and added the following maps:

- Sketch of the Acquisitions of Russia since the Accession of Peter 1st. to the Throne
- Australia from surveys made by order of the British Government
- Eastern portion of Australia
- Maritime portion of South Australia

=== 1840 edition of the London Atlas of Universal Geography (62 maps) ===
The 1840 edition of the Atlas (in the Library of Congress) had the same 54 maps as the 1838 edition, with the addition of the following maps:

- Cockburn Sound by J.S. Roe
- Map *District of Adelaide, South Australia
- Eastern townships of Lower Canada
- Western townships of Lower Canada with inset of Quebec
- Map of Jamaica
- Map of The Leeward Islands
- Map of the Windward Islands
- Map of British Guiana

=== 1844 edition of the London Atlas of Universal Geography (65 maps) ===
Arrowsmith's Map of Texas from the Atlas

The 1844 edition of the Atlas (also in the Rumsey collection) had 58 maps of the 1840 edition, excluding the following:

- Cockburn Sound by J.S. Roe
- District of Adelaide, South Australia
- Eastern townships of Lower Canada
- Western townships of Lower Canada with inset of Quebec

with the addition of the following maps:

- The West Coast of Africa
- The River Niger
- Map of Asia Minor
- The Caspian Sea
- Map of Texas
- New Zealand
- The Ionian Islands and Malta

=== Later maps ===
- 1848: Southern Tip of Vancouver Island and Oregon Territory
- 1849: Vancouver Island and the Adjacent Coasts
- 1850: Asia Trade Routes
- [1853?]: Southern Tip of Vancouver Island
- 1856: Vancouver Island
- 1857: South Africa - Showing the Routes of the Rev'd Dr. Livingstone between the years 1849 & 1857
- 1865: South Eastern Africa - Map of the River Shire, the Lakes Nyassa & Shirwa, the Lower Courses of the Rivers Zambesi, & Rovuma
