= Sir Richard Wells, 1st Baronet =

British Baronet (1879–1956)

Sir Richard Wells Bt DL
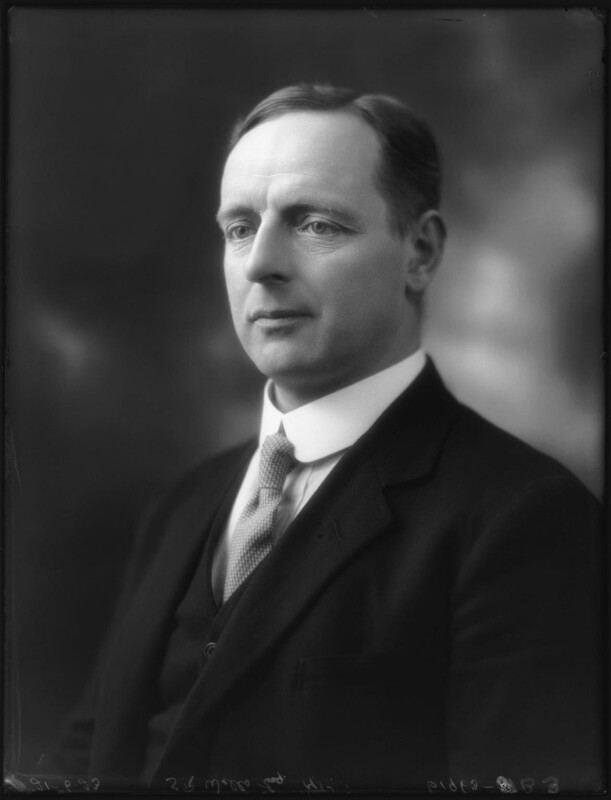
- Wells in 1923

Member of Parliament for Bedford
- In office 15 November 1922 – 15 June 1945
- Prime Minister: Bonar Law, Stanley Baldwin, Ramsay MacDonald, Stanley Baldwin, Neville Chamberlain, Winston Churchill

Personal details
- Born: 3 August 1879
- Died: 16 November 1957 (aged 78)
- Party: Conservative
- Spouse(s): Dorothy, née Maltby
- Children: 9 including Sir Charles Wells, 2nd Baronet and George Crichton Wells
- Education: Bedford School

Sir Sydney Richard Wells, 1st Baronet, DL (3 August 1879 – 16 November 1957) was a British baronet, the first of the Wells baronets of Felmersham, and a Conservative Party politician. He was the Member of Parliament (MP) for Bedford from 1922 to 1945.

== Biography ==
Born on 3 August 1879, the son of Charles Wells, founder of the brewery company Charles Wells Ltd, Sir Richard Wells was educated at Bedford School. He was Conservative Member of Parliament (MP) for Bedford, between 1922 and 1945, and the first of the Wells baronets of Felmersham, created on 21 January 1944.

Wells was Chancellor of the Primrose League from 1946 - 1948.

Wells died on 26 November 1957 and was succeeded as Baronet by his son, Sir Charles Maltby Wells, 2nd Baronet.

== Wife and children ==
Wells was married to an artist, Dorothy, née Maltby, who bore him seven sons and two daughters. They included twins, Oliver and Sarah, who were born in 1922. Wells' elder daughter, Sydney, was married to a Royal Navy officer. All of Wells' other eight children served in the armed forces in the Second World War, which led to the family being dubbed "The Fighting Wellses of Felmersham".

Wells lost three sons in combat. Sqn Ldr James "Jimmy" Wells commanded No. 600 Squadron RAF and was killed when his Bristol Blenheim was shot down over The Netherlands on 10 May 1940. Lt Cdr Christopher "Kit" Wells was a gunnery officer on HMS Glorious and was killed when she was sunk in the Norwegian campaign on 8 June 1940. Major Thomas "Tom" Wells served in the Bedfordshire and Hertfordshire Regiment and was killed in the Battle of Singapore on 13 or 14 February 1942.

Wells' eldest son, Charles Maltby Wells, served in the Royal Engineers and reached the rank of lieutenant colonel. Another son, David, served in the Burma campaign and was awarded the Military Cross. Another, George Crichton Wells, served in the Royal Army Medical Corps and reached the rank of Major. Wells' younger daughter, Sarah, joined the Women's Royal Naval Service in 1942. She served as a motorcycle despatch rider and by the end of the war was a Leading Wren.

Sarah's twin brother, Oliver, served in No. 7 Squadron RAF. On 30 August 1943 his Avro Lancaster was shot down in Belgium but he survived the crash and the Belgian Resistance sheltered him. Four months later the Comet Line tried to get him to Spain, but he was captured in Brussels. He spent the rest of the conflict as a prisoner of war, much of it in Stalag Luft III in Silesia.

After the war Oliver served with No. 203 Squadron RAF, flew a Short Sunderland in the Berlin Airlift and was promoted to Wing commander. After their armed forces careers David and Oliver Wells became directors of the Charles Wells brewing business, and served as successive chairmen. Their brother George became a leading dermatologist.

Parliament of the United Kingdom
Preceded by Frederick Kellaway	Member of Parliament for Bedford; 1922–1945	Succeeded by Thomas Skeffington-Lodge
Baronetage of the United Kingdom
New creation	Baronet (of Felmersham); 1944–1957	Succeeded by Charles Maltby Wells
