= Mosquito bite allergy =

Excessive reactions to mosquito bites

Circumscribed erythema related to severe mosquito bite allergy

Mosquito bite allergies, also termed hypersensitivity to mosquito bites, are excessive reactions of varying severity to mosquito bites. They are allergic hypersensitivity reactions caused by the non-toxic allergenic proteins contained in the saliva injected by a female mosquito (male mosquitos do not take blood-meals) at the time it takes its blood meal, and are not caused by any toxin or pathogen. By general agreement, mosquito bite allergies do not include the ordinary wheal and flare responses to these bites although these reactions are also allergic in nature. Ordinary mosquito bite allergies are nonetheless detailed here because they are the best understood reactions to mosquito bites and provide a basis for describing what is understood about them.

Mosquito bite allergies are informally classified as 1) the skeeter syndrome, i.e., severe local skin reactions sometimes associated with low-grade fever; 2) systemic reactions that range from high-grade fever, lymphadenopathy, abdominal pain, and/or diarrhea to, very rarely, life-threatening symptoms of anaphylaxis; and 3) severe and often systemic reactions occurring in individuals that have an Epstein-Barr virus-associated lymphoproliferative disease, Epstein-Barr virus-negative lymphoid malignancy, or another predisposing condition such as eosinophilic cellulitis or chronic lymphocytic leukemia. The term papular urticaria is commonly used for a reaction to mosquito bites that is dominated by widely spread hives. Here, papular urticaria is regarded as a symptom of mosquito bite allergy manifested in individuals with one of the other mosquito bite allergies, but particularly in those associated with eosinophilic cellulitis.

Mosquitos belong to the biological order of Diptera (which includes all two-winged insects), suborder Nematocera, family Culicidea. There are >3,500 different mosquito species with the Aedes and Culex genera being common in North America. It is assumed that any species of mosquito that causes an ordinary mosquito bite reaction in humans is capable of causing mosquito bite allergies. In addition to mosquitoes, the Diptera order includes numerous other types of biting insects such as midges (e.g. sand flies) and gnats. Bites by the latter insects or possibly some other insects may cause reactions that are mechanistically and clinically similar to those seen with mosquito bites.

Mosquito bite allergies occur more often where insect bites are frequent. Consequently, cases (as well as various other allergic disorders) are more prevalent in tropical climates, underdeveloped areas, and areas dominated by poverty. That is, not only climate but also cultural and socioeconomic conditions play roles in facilitating the development and prevalence of diverse allergic diseases, including mosquito bite allergies.

== Ordinary reactions ==
=== Presentations ===
The typical reaction to mosquito bites involves the development of an itchy wheal that may contain a central red dot and is surrounded by splotchy redness. This "immediate reaction" occurs at some time during the first 20 minutes following the bite. Within hours of the bite, a "delayed reaction", in which the wheal evolves into a papule develops and then dissipates over the next few days or weeks. However, there is a wide variability in the type of reaction that individuals mount in response to these bites. The initial mosquito bites in previously unexposed individuals do not cause a skin reaction but do initiate the development of antibodies and/or lymphocytes that are directed against the allergens in mosquitoes' saliva. These individuals thereby become sensitized and reactive to subsequent mosquito bites. After repetitive mosquito bites, individuals may become less sensitive or completely insensitive to the bites in the natural process of allergen desensitization. Individuals therefore progress through five stages in which the type of reaction to a mosquito bite depends on the number of their previous bite exposures and levels of acquired sensitization and desensitization to these bites. The 5 stages an individual may undergo in reacting to repetitive mosquito bites are:

- Stage I: Previously unexposed individuals have no immediate or delayed reaction.
- Stage II: Shortly after their initial exposure, individuals become partly sensitized and therefore develop a delayed but no immediate reaction.
- Stage III: Following further exposures, individuals become fully sensitized and therefore have an immediate reaction followed by a delayed reaction.
- Stage IV: After >2–20 years of repetitive exposures, individuals may become partially desensitized and therefore have an immediate but no delayed reaction.
- Stage V: After many further exposures during the 2–20 years of repetitive exposures, individuals may become fully desensitized and therefore show no reaction.

In a study of 41 Canadian adults experimentally exposed to mosquito bites, 11 individuals exhibited no reaction, 23 individuals exhibited immediate followed by delayed reactions, 6 individuals exhibited only immediate reactions, and 1 individual exhibited only a delayed reaction. Overall, 70-90% of individuals experience an immediate reaction, and 55-65% experience a delayed reaction to mosquito bites.

Individuals also vary in the severity of their reactions to mosquito bites. Most individuals show a "small reaction" in which a 2–10 mm (0.1-0.4 inches) diameter wheal evolves into a similarly sized papule that dissipates over several days. About 2.5% of individuals (based on self reports) show a "large reaction" in which the wheal is much larger than 10 mm (it may exceed 3 cm, i.e. 1.2 inches) in diameter and evolves into an extensive lesion that has black and blue discolorations due to subcutaneous bleeding, blistering, and/or necrosis. The latter reactions, which appear to be caused by the development of an inflammatory Arthus reaction at the site, may be very painful.

=== Pathophysiology ===
Mosquito saliva contains >30 potentially allergenic proteins. More than 11 of these have been identified in the saliva of the Aedes egypti mosquito. Four such proteins, termed Aed a 1 (an apyrase), Aed 2 (Female-specific protein, D7), Aed 3 (an as yet undefined protein), and Aed a 4 (an α-glucosidase) have been purified as recombinant proteins. Each of these recombinants causes immediate and delayed skin reactions when injected into volunteers with a history of mosquito bite reactivity. As exemplified by the Aed proteins, the proteins in the saliva of any biting mosquito are thought to cause individuals who have not been previously bitten to: a) make IgE and IgG antibodies that bind the proteins inducing their formation and b) develop T cells (a type of lymphocyte) that react against parts of the inducing proteins that are displayed on the surface of cells at the bite site (see Antigen presentation). In subsequent mosquito bites, IgE and IgG appear involved in the development of both immediate and delayed skin reactions. T cells appear to be involved in the development of the delayed skin reactions. The acquired IgE binds mosquito saliva proteins and then triggers skin tissue cells such as mast cells to release at least two mediators of allergic reactions, histamine and leukotriene C4. These mediators contribute to the development of the wheal, itch, and other components of the immediate reaction. This part of the immediate reaction is a classical type I hypersensitivity reaction. The acquired IgG binds mosquito saliva proteins to form an immune complex-triggered type III hypersensitivity reaction that recruits blood leukocytes, including T cells, into the bite area; this response it thought to be required for developing the early stage of the delayed reaction. T cells present in or recruited to the mosquito bite area appear responsible for mediating the full delayed reaction. The full delayed reaction is a type IV hypersensitivity reaction.

=== Diagnosis ===
The diagnosis of ordinary mosquito reactions is made based on the history and clinical features of mosquito bites.

=== Prevention ===
Reducing mosquito breeding areas (e.g. eliminating standing water pools, stocking ponds with fish that consume mosquito larva) and the use of other mosquito control methods such as insecticides, mosquito traps, protective clothing, bed nets, and repellants (e.g., DEET or permethrin) are effective, highly recommended means for reducing mosquito bites. Daily doses of a non-sedating second-generation anti-histamines (e.g. cetirizine or levocetirizine) can effectively reduce the immediate and delayed reactions to mosquito bites. The use of recombinant mosquito saliva proteins to desensitize individuals against developing reactions to mosquito bites has yielded variable results and requires further study.

=== Treatment ===
Treatment of ordinary small or large mosquito bite reactions is limited to the use of non-sedative H1 antihistamines, e.g. cetirizine or a drug with combined activity in inhibiting histamine and platelet-activating factor, e.g. rupatadine. Randomized, double-blinded, placebo-controlled studies are needed to determine if antileukotriene drugs or topical steroids have beneficial effects in reducing the symptoms of these bites.

== Skeeter syndrome reactions ==
=== Presentation ===
The Skeeter syndrome is by definition a mosquito bite allergy that consists of a large mosquito bite reaction that may be accompanied by a brief or longer-term (i.e., days to weeks) low-grade fever. and, on rare occasions, vomiting. The bite site shows an intense, large reaction often resembling a cellulitis infection that persists for days to weeks. The syndrome usually afflicts healthy children, immune-deficient persons, and individuals who are new to an area inhabited by mosquito species to which they have not been exposed.

=== Pathophysiology ===
Mechanistically, the Skeeter syndrome appears to be a particularly intense variant of the ordinary mosquito bite reaction. It involves sequential Type I, III, and IV hypersensitivity reactions that are mediated by IgE, IgG, and T cells that are directed against mosquito salivary proteins.

=== Prognosis ===
Children afflicted with the syndrome remain healthy, although subject to recurrent severe reactions to mosquito bites. The development of desensitization that follows repetitive mosquito bites and reduces the intensity or completely blocks reactions to mosquito bites may take longer to develop and/or be less effective in those with Skeeter syndrome compared to those with ordinary mosquito bite reactions.

=== Diagnosis ===
The diagnosis of Skeeter syndrome is based mainly on the appropriate history of severe skin responses to mosquito bites that may be associated with fever. The diagnosis can be supported by the detection, using for example an ELISA assay), IgE directed against mosquito saliva proteins in the afflicted individual's serum. Direct mosquito bite testing is perhaps the best method for diagnosing mosquito bite allergy but difficulty in determining which mosquito species to use for the test, the possibility of transmitting a mosquito-borne disease, and the risk of triggering a very severe response make this test impractical for routine use.

=== Prevention and treatment ===
The preventive measures listed for ordinary mosquito bite reactions are important for avoiding Skeeter syndrome reactions. In addition to second-generation, non-sedative H1 antihistamines, antipyretics and nonsteroidal anti-inflammatory drugs are typically used to treat patients with acute attacks of the syndrome.

== Systemic allergic reactions ==
=== Presentation ===
Individuals with systemic mosquito bite allergies respond to mosquito bites with intense local skin reactions (e.g. blisters, ulcers, necrosis, scarring) and concurrent or subsequent systemic symptoms (high-grade fever and/or malaise; less commonly, muscle cramps, bloody diarrhea, bloody urine, proteinuria, and/or wheezing; or very rarely, symptoms of overt anaphylaxis such as hives, angioedema (i.e. skin swelling in non-mosquito bite areas), shortness of breath, rapid heart rate, and low blood-pressure). There are very rare reports of death due to anaphylaxis following mosquito bites. Individuals with an increased risk of developing severe mosquito bite reactions include those experiencing a particularly large number of mosquito bites, those with no previous exposure to the species of mosquito causing the bites, and those with an incompletely developed immune system, such as infants and young children. Individuals with certain Epstein-Barr virus-associated lymphoproliferative, non-Epstein-Barr virus malignant lymphoid, or other predisposing disease also have an increased rate of systemic mosquito bite reactions but are considered in a separate category.

=== Pathophysiology ===
Systemic mosquito bite reactions appear to be primarily Type I hypersensitivity reactions that are critically mediated by IgE directed against mosquito salivary gland proteins.

=== Diagnosis ===
The methods used to diagnose systemic mosquito bite allergies are similar to those used to diagnose the Skeeter syndrome, including a typical case history and, in particular, ELISA tests to detect specific IgE directed against mosquito salivary proteins.

=== Prevention ===
The methods used to avoid mosquito bites are of particular importance for preventing systemic mosquito bite allergies, given their severity. These include avoiding mosquito-infested areas, the use of repellants such as DEET or permethrin, and mosquito bite desensitization procedures once they have been shown to be safe and effective for this severe form of mosquito allergy.

=== Prevention and treatment ===
Systemic mosquito bite reactions are serious and, on rare occasions, may be life-threatening. Individuals at risk for developing anaphylactic symptoms in response to mosquito bites should carry an Epinephrine autoinjector for immediate use following a mosquito bite. These individuals as well as those without self-injecting epinephrine who develop symptoms of anaphylaxis following a mosquito bite should be treated as medical emergencies requiring anaphylaxis management. Individuals with less severe symptoms of systemic mosquito bite reactions require monitoring and treatments tailored to their symptoms. These treatments may include systemic corticosteroids, second-generation H1 anti-histamines, and anti-pyretics similar to those used to treat the Skeeter syndrome.

== Reactions associated with predisposing factors ==
=== Epstein-Barr virus-associated lymphoproliferative diseases ===
Mosquito bite allergies afflict individuals who have any one of various types of Epstein–Barr virus-associated lymphoproliferative diseases (EBV+ LPD). About 33% of patients with chronic active EBV infection are afflicted by mosquito bite allergies. Other Epstein-Barr virus-associated lymphoproliferative disease reported to predispose individuals to mosquito bite allergies include Epstein-Barr virus-positive Hodgkin disease, hydroa vacciniforme, hemophagocytic lymphohistiocytosis, aggressive NK-cell leukemia (also termed aggressive NK-cell leukemia/lymphoma), and extranodal NK/T-cell lymphoma, nasal type. Mosquito bite allergies in individuals with chronic active Epstein-Barr virus infection are the best studied of those that occur in Epstein-Barr virus-associated lymphoproliferative disease; much of what is known in this area is based on these individuals.

==== Presentation ====
Cases of mosquito bite allergies associated with Epstein-Barr virus-associated lymphoproliferative disease have been reported most often in Japan, Taiwan, Korea, and the native populations of Mexico, Central America, and South America. This reaction occurs primarily in younger individuals (0–18 years old; mean age 6.7 years) who have evidence of one of the predisposing Epstein-Barr virus-associated lymphoproliferative diseases. Rarely, however, it occurs in individuals who exhibit no signs or symptoms of a predisposing disorder but later develop chronic active Epstein-Barr virus infection. In addition to the signs and symptoms of their specific Epstein-Barr virus-associated lymphoproliferative disease (see Epstein-Barr virus-associated lymphoproliferative diseases), these individuals are subject to severe local as well as systemic reactions to mosquito bites. The bite sites are infiltrated with T helper cells, CD8+ T cells, and CD16+ NK cells. In this mixture of infiltrates, most of the cells exhibiting EBV positivity are T helper cells. The systemic reactions include: fever and malaise; enlarged lymph nodes, liver, and/or spleen; liver dysfunction; hematuria; and proteinuria. The individuals exhibit greatly increased numbers of circulating NK cells, increased levels of T helper cells. and increased levels of IgE. Some of the circulating NK cells are clearly infected with EBV. The mosquito bitten tissues show perivascular infiltrations containing T and NK cells; a large percentage of these NK cells are EBV positive. Cases associated with chronic active Epstein-Barr virus infection commonly progress to a more serious Epstein-Barr virus-associated lymphoproliferative disease such as marginal zone B-cell lymphoma or a Hodgkin lymphoma-like B cell lymphoma.

==== Pathophysiology ====
The allergenic proteins in the mosquito's salivary gland are thought to trigger the reactivation of EBV in the NK cells that are latently infected with the virus. Upon reactivation, the virus expresses certain of its gene products, particularly that of its LMP1 oncogene, as well as induces its infected cells to release certain of their gene products, particularly interferon gamma and interleukin 10, which cause the cells it infects to lyse and release EBV to infect other cells or, alternatively, to become immortalized, proliferate, and, possibly, become malignant.

==== Diagnosis ====
The diagnosis of mosquito bite allergies in Epstein-Barr virus-associated lymphoproliferative disease depends on finding evidence of the lymphoproliferative disease, a compatible clinical presentation, and detection of EBV in the NK and T cells (e.g., T helper cells) in blood and/or mosquito-bitten tissues. The presence of high levels of EBV+ circulating NK cells strongly supports the diagnosis. However, an exceptionally high density of EBV+ in the skin lesions and/or blood raises the possibility that the individual has a NK-cell lymphoma/leukemia. Lympoid cells at the bite site may also express the EBV1 viral gene, BZLF1; this gene promotes the lyses of its infected cell host and when detected in bite sites is a marker of a poor prognosis.

==== Treatment ====
The best treatment for mosquito bite allergy in individuals with an Epstein-Barr virus-associated lymphoproliferative disease varies. Mild and clearly uncomplicated cases with, for example, indolent CAEV, are treated conservatively, focusing on relieving skin irritation, fever, and malaise. Cases with evidence of significant complications of CAEFV, such as the development of hemophagocytosis, NK/T cell lymphoma, or aggressive NK cell lymphoma, generally require chemotherapeutic regimens directed at these complications. Individuals with EBV+ systemic mosquito bite allergy and clear evidence of concurrent aggressive chronic active Epstein-Barr virus infection have been treated with relative success by the 3-step regimen used to treat the latter. Rare cases of systemic mosquito bite allergy have been reported to occur in individuals who have no apparent predisposing disease but later develop chronic active Epstein-Barr virus infection. Such cases require careful evaluation and follow-up for development of a predisposing disorder.

=== Eosinophilic cellulitis ===
Eosinophilic cellulitis, also known as Wells syndrome, is a rare skin disease usually occurring on the extremities and/or trunk that is characterized by episodic acute urticarial eruptions or erysipelas-like rashes which proceed to develop over the ensuing ~6 weeks into granuloma-like or morphea-like lesions. The initial lesions may be papules, plaques, vesicles, or blisters and give a burning or itchy sensation. The eruptions may be accompanied by fever, arthralgia or other systemic symptoms. The disorder predominantly affects adults, frequently takes a protracted course, and has a high rate of spontaneous remission but is often recurrent with relapses occurring even long after remissions. One study found a relapse rate of 56% during an observation period of up to 19 months. Relapses are more frequent in adults than in children. While these lesions usually resolve without sequelae, they may result in skin atrophy and hyperpigmentation. Individuals afflicted with eosinophilic cellulitis may have a history of other diseases including various eosinophlic skin diseases, abnormally high levels of circulating blood eosinophils, the hypereosinophilic syndrome, eosinophilic granulomatosis with polyangiitis, ulcerative colitis, arthralgias, myalgias, facial nerve paralysis, photosensitivity, polycythemia vera, chronic myeloid leukemia, chronic lymphocytic leukemia, Hodgkin lymphoma, nasopharyngeal cancer, and renal cell carcinoma. Episodes of the disorder are sometimes triggered by: drugs (e.g. antimicrobial agents, biologics, antihypertensive agents, diuretics, thyroid hormones, analgesics, cytostatic agents, and anesthetics); vaccines; skin contact with chemicals (e.g. p-phenylenediamine, thiomersal, and cladribine); viral, bacterial, fungal, and parasitic infections; and insect bites.

Mosquitoes trigger mosquito bite allergies in individuals with eosinophilic cellulitis. They are also thought to trigger mosquito bite allergies that are followed by and therefore trigger the development of eosinophilic cellulitis in individuals with no prior evidence of the disease. It is also possible, however, that these individuals have an undiagnosed, latent form of the disease. The acute eruptions, which may be singular or multiple, occur at the bite site and may spread locally or to more distant skin sites. The classification of all these eosinophilic cellulitis reactions, whether triggered by a mosquito bite, triggered by some other agent, or apparently untriggered, is argued; it has been proposed that eosinophilic cellulites is not a distinct clinical entity but rather a set of skin reactions in various diagnosed or yet-to be diagnosed disorders that involve hypereosinophilia, dysfunctional eosinophils, and/or pathological reactions to foreign antigens which predispose individuals to developing these reactions. Eosinophilic cellulitis-associated mosquito bite allergies appear to be non-specific type IV hypersensitivity reactions in which T helper cells release cytokines such as IL5 to attract, activate, promote the degranulation, and prolong the survival of eosinophils. These eosinophils discharge eosinophilic cationic, major basic, and other proteins which injure cells and tissues and thereby may contribute to the severity of the skin lesions. The lesions typically are scattered red nodules or diffuse areas consisting of eosinophil infiltrates and flame-like figures composed of eosinophil deposits and collagen bundles. Over time, these lesions become granulomatous and scarred. Patients with the disorder may have numerous scars due to previous bouts of mosquito bite allergies.

The diagnosis, which can be challenging to distinguish from other skin disorders, is based on a history of mosquito bites and previous or concurrent predisposing diseases, the course taken by the skin lesions, and the pathology of these lesions. Blood eosinophil levels are elevated in about half of these cases. The disorder has generally been either untreated or treated with short- or longer-term oral glucocorticoids, topical glucocorticoids, and/or injections of glucocorticoids into the skin lesions, depending on lesion severity. Oral antihistamines are used to alleviate associated itchiness. Anti-inflammatory drugs and immunomodulatory agents such as dapsone, hydroxychloroquine, cyclosporine, interferon alfa, tacrolimus, TNF inhibitors, various antifungal agents, and numerous other agents have been used to treat the disorder in case reports but their value in treating the disorder as well as mosquito bite allergies is unclear. If a causative disorder triggering or predisposing to the development of eosinophilic cellulitis is identified, the best treatment option is to treat this disorder. Patients with eosinophilic cellulitis should be followed to determine if their disorder progresses into a more serious disease such as the hypereosinophilic syndrome, eosinophilic fasciitis, or the eosinophilic granulomatosis with polyangiitis.

=== Chronic lymphocytic leukemia ===
Several case reports have found that individuals with chronic lymphocytic leukemia are predisposed to develop severe skin reactions to mosquito and other insect bites. However, there are reports that chronic lymphocytic leukemia patients can develop similarly severe skin reactions in the absence of an insect bite history. The pathology of the insect bite sites in these cases resembles the findings in lesions of eosinophilic cellulitis in individuals with mosquito bite allergies but the mechanism behind these reactions is unknown. There are too few reports to establish treatment recommendations for mosquito bite allergy I chronic lymphocytic leukemia beyond those generally used to treat other types of mosquito bite allergies.

=== Mantle cell lymphoma ===
In rare cases, mantle cell lymphoma, a subtype of B-cell lymphomas, has been reported in association with mosquito bite allergies. In several of these cases, the mosquito bite allergies occurred before the diagnosis of mantle cell lymphoma, suggesting that mosquito bite allergies can be a manifestation of early development, and therefore a harbinger of mantle cell lymphoma. While most of these cases have not been associated with EBV infection, some cases of mosquito bite allergies in Asia have been reported to occur in EBV-positive MBL. Due to the rarity of these cases, the difference between EBV-negative and EBV-positive mantle cell lymphoma, as well as the best treatments for mosquito bite allergies in these two forms of mantle cell lymphoma, has not been determined.
