= Skeeter syndrome =

Severe allergic inflammatory reaction from mosquito bites

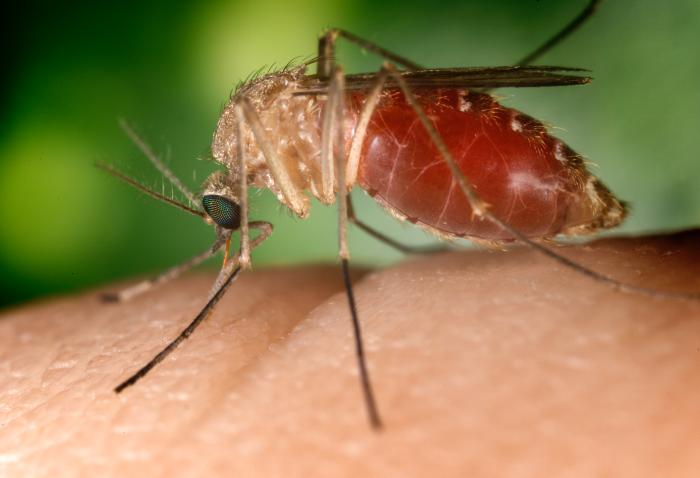
- Culex mosquito on a human finger
- Symptoms: Redness, heat, abnormal swelling surrounding bite site, pus, pain at the site

Skeeter syndrome (also papular urticaria) is a localized severe allergic reaction to mosquito bites, consisting of inflammation, peeling skin, blistering, ulceration and sometimes fever. It is caused by allergenic polypeptides in mosquito saliva, and therefore is not contagious. It is one of several forms, being one of the most severe, of allergic responses to mosquito bites, termed mosquito bite allergies.

The condition may vary between individuals based on the reaction size and severity. Some individuals may experience reactions only to some bites and not others, thought to be attributed to varying reactions to different species of mosquitoes.

Although the term seems informal, it has appeared in scientific literature.

== Diagnosis ==
Circumscribed erythema related to severe mosquito bite allergic reaction.

Clinical examination alone cannot distinguish between a response caused by infection, such as cellulitis, and skeeter syndrome. However, skeeter syndrome usually progresses over the course of hours versus cellulitis, which typically evolves over the course of several days. As such, accurate history is imperative when making the diagnosis. Since IgE and IgG are key players in mosquito allergy, diagnosis can be confirmed by an immunosorbent assay measuring IgE and IgG to mosquito saliva antigens.

=== Differential diagnosis ===
Skeeter syndrome should not be confused with another type of reactivity to mosquito bites, severe mosquito bite allergy (SMBA). SMBA is most often an Epstein–Barr virus–associated lymphoproliferative disease that complicates ~33% of individuals with chronic active Epstein–Barr virus infection or, in extremely rare cases, individuals with Epstein-Barr virus-positive Hodgkin disease or an Epstein-Barr virus-negative lymphoid disease such as chronic lymphocytic leukemia and mantle cell lymphoma. It is a hypersensitivity reaction characterized by the rapid development of skin redness, swelling, ulcers, necrosis and scarring following mosquito bites. The reaction is often accompanied by relatively severe systemic symptoms such as fever and malaise; enlarged lymph nodes, liver, and/or spleen; liver dysfunction; hematuria; and proteinuria.

== Treatment ==
Taking oral cetirizine regularly has been known to help those who suffer from skeeter syndrome. In addition to oral steroids, topical steroids and other anti-itch creams can ease the reaction.
