= Hereford Square =

Garden square in London, England

Coordinates: 51°29′32.61″N 0°10′53.42″W

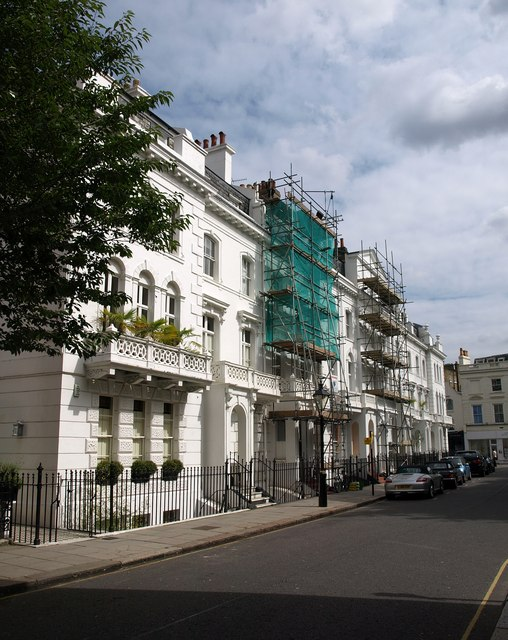
Hereford Square, north side

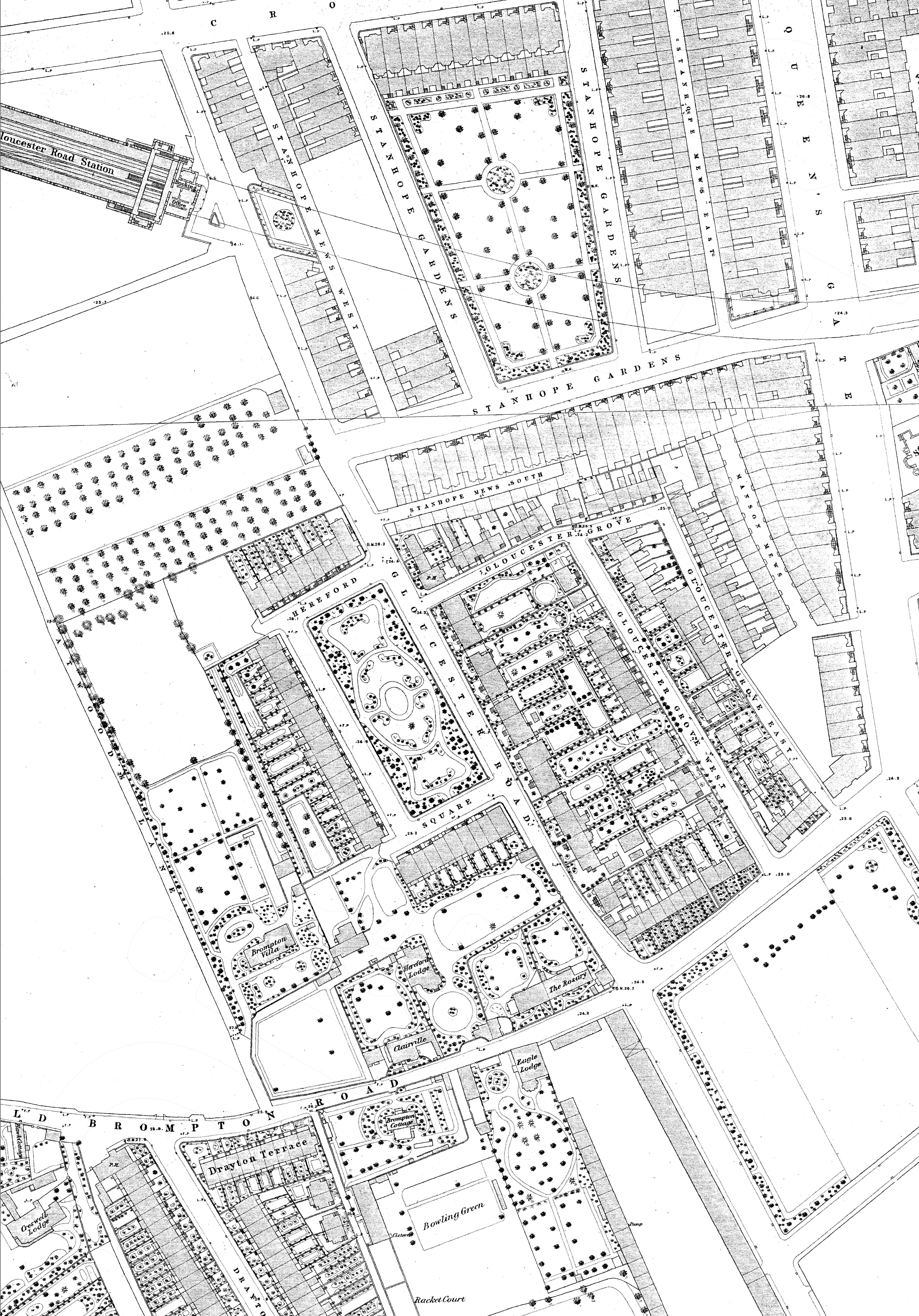
Hereford Square (centre) on an 1860s Ordnance Survey map not long after it was built and before the area was fully developed

Hereford Square is a garden square in South Kensington, London SW7. It lies to the west of Gloucester Road, which forms the east side of the square. Wetherby Place is the western continuation, running off the north-west corner of the square.

10–23 and 27–35 Hereford Square have been listed Grade II on the National Heritage List for England since November 1984.

The private communal gardens in the centre of Hereford Square are 0.3692 hectares (0.912 acres) in size.

The garden was used as a baseball field during World War II by American soldiers.

== History ==
Hereford Square was built by the architect Thomas Holmes from 1845 to 1850.

The directly bomb struck houses from World War II have been rebuilt to imitate their original style recently after being yellow brick buildings for over 50 years. However, 1-5 are still concrete boxes. The houses all follow a relatively similar design with landings, many floors and an underground storage shed also used as a plant room or server room as well as a patio at the back.

== Notable buildings and residents ==
- George Crichton Wells (1914–1999), dermatologist
- George Borrow (1803–1881), lived at No. 22.
- Frederick William Hulme (1816–1884), landscape painter and illustrator, lived at No. 4, according to the 1851 census.
- John Arrowsmith, cartographer, lived at No. 35 from 1861 to 1873.
- Robert Nandor Berki, political scientist, lived at No. 7 in the late 1950s.
- William Henry Brookfield, clergyman, died at No. 16 in 1874.
- H. O. Arnold-Forster, writer and politician, died at No. 27 in 1909.

The artist Walter Sickert and his wife Ellen stayed at No. 10 Hereford Square in the autumn of 1890 with Ellen's sister, Jane Cobden. The model and writer Tara Moss recalled living in a "freezing granny flat" of a mansion in Hereford Square while she worked as a babysitter during the early days of her modelling career in her 2014 memoir The Fictional Woman.

The writer and social activist Frances Power Cobbe lived with her partner, the sculptor Mary Lloyd, at No. 26 from 1862 to 1884.

== Fictional references ==
The central character in Iris Murdoch's A Severed Head lives in Hereford Square.
