= Eosinophilic cellulitis =

- Other names: Wells' syndrome, recurrent granulomatous dermatitis with eosinophilia
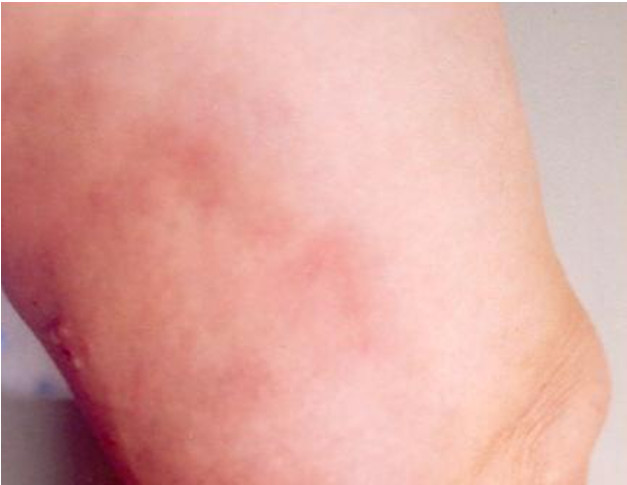
- Initial rash in eosinophilic cellulitis
- Specialty: Dermatology
- Symptoms: Painful, red, raised, warm patches of skin, fever, joint pain
- Usual onset: Sudden and recurrent
- Duration: Few weeks
- Causes: Unknown
- Differential diagnosis: Vasculitis, cellulitis, anaphylaxis
- Medication: Corticosteroids, antihistamines
- Prognosis: Often goes away by itself
- Frequency: ~200 documented cases

Eosinophilic cellulitis, also known as Wells' syndrome (not to be confused with Weil's disease), is a skin disease that presents with painful, red, raised, and warm patches of skin. The rash comes on suddenly, lasts for a few weeks, and often repeatedly comes back. Scar formation does not typically occur.

Eosinophilic cellulitis is of unknown cause. It is suspected to be an autoimmune disorder. It may be triggered by bites from insects and arachnids such as spiders, fleas, or ticks, or from medications or surgery. Diagnosis is made after other potential cases are ruled out. Skin biopsy of the affected areas may show an increased number of eosinophils. Other conditions that may appear similar include cellulitis, contact dermatitis, and severe allergic reactions such as anaphylaxis.

Treatment is often with a corticosteroids. Steroids applied as a cream is generally recommended over the use of steroids by mouth. Antihistamines may be used to help with itchiness. Many times the condition goes away after a few weeks without treatment. The condition is uncommon. It affects both sexes with the same frequency. It was first described by George Crichton Wells in 1971.

== Cause ==
Eosinophilic cellulitis is of unknown cause. It is suspected to be an autoimmune disorder. It may be triggered by bites from insects such as mosquitos, spiders, fleas, or ticks, or from medications or surgery.

== Diagnosis ==
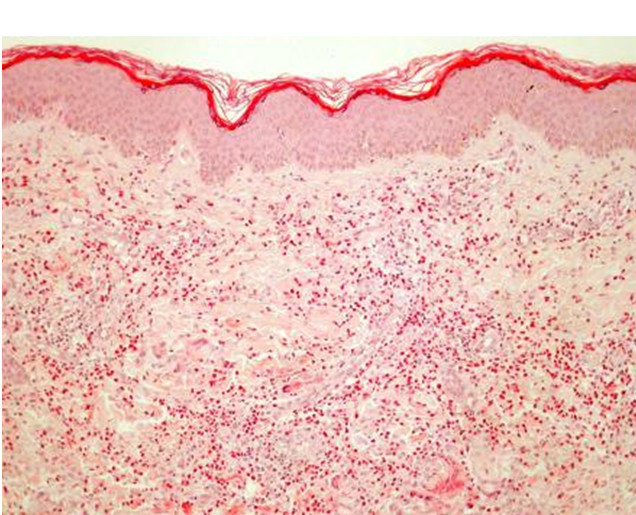
Histology of a skin biopsy from acute phase eosinophilic cellulitis. Note findings of plentiful tissue eosinophils and flame figures at the deeper corium sections (hematoxylin & eosin, original magnification ×40).

Diagnosis requires ruling out other potential causes. This includes ruling out vasculitis on skin biopsy.

== Treatment ==
Treatment is often with a steroids. This can be either applied as a cream or taken by mouth. As the condition tends to get better on its own taking steroids by mouth should generally only be tried if the rash covers a large area and it does not get better with other measures.
