= Radwell, Bedfordshire =

Hamlet in Bedfordshire, England

Coordinates: 52.2062°N 0.5317°W

Radwell
- Location within Bedfordshire
- OS grid reference: TL050567
- Civil parish: Felmersham
- Unitary authority: Bedford
- Ceremonial county: Bedfordshire
- Region: East
- Country: England
- Sovereign state: United Kingdom
- Post town: Bedford
- Postcode district: MK43 7
- Dialling code: 01234
- Police: Bedfordshire
- Fire: Bedfordshire
- Ambulance: East of England
- UK Parliament: North Bedfordshire

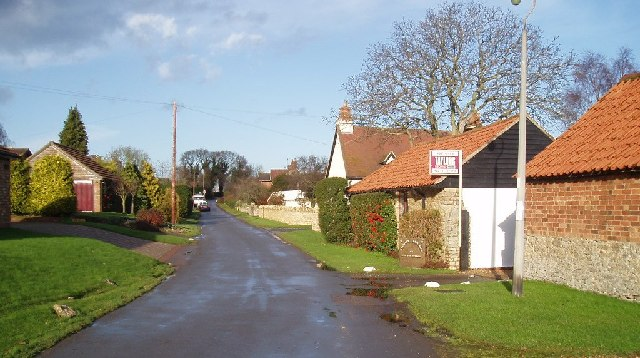
Radwell village

Radwell is a hamlet in the Borough of Bedford in north Bedfordshire, England. It is on the River Great Ouse in Felmersham civil parish, about 7 miles (11 km) north west of Bedford.

The hamlet has no church, but is part of the parish of St. Mary's, Felmersham. A chapel dedicated to St James was first recorded in 1204, but had fallen out of use by the 17th century. A Methodist chapel in Moor End Road, built in 1807, has been converted to a residence. At the end of Moor End Road is a riding stable, and further on are Radwell lakes, a popular fishing spot with many swans.

The road leading into Radwell from the south is Radwell Road and frequently floods after heavy rain. There is a stone bridge across the river. Built in 1766 by Thomas Morris, it originally cost £292-10s-0d. As it was not maintained by the county, by 1775 it was "ruinous and in great decay", but was taken over by the county in 1805. The bridge was grade II listed by English Heritage in August 1987.

== History ==
Excavations of the gravel pits to the north of the settlement showed evidence of occupation during the Roman period, with a field and ditch system and the remains of two timber buildings, probably a farmstead.

The hamlet was mentioned in Domesday as Radeuuelle, listed with a population of 18 households, under two landowners. It was in the Hundred of Willey.

A public house, the Swan Inn, was first recorded as an ale house in 1728.

Between the two world wars, there was a privately run miniature railway, the Radwell Manor Railway, to the north of the settlement, which was occasionally open to the public. It was abandoned around 1940, and dismantled later, possibly in the 1960s.
