= Wells baronets =

Set index for Wells baronets

There have been three baronetcies created for persons with the surname Wells, all in the Baronetage of the United Kingdom. As of 2026 one of the creations is extant.

- Wells baronets of Upper Grosvenor Street (1883)
- Wells baronets of Felmersham (1944)
- Wells baronets of Hove (1948): see Sir Frederick Michael Wells, 1st Baronet (1884–1966)
