= Felmersham =

Village in Bedfordshire, England

Coordinates: 52.209°N 0.55°W

- Village and civil parish
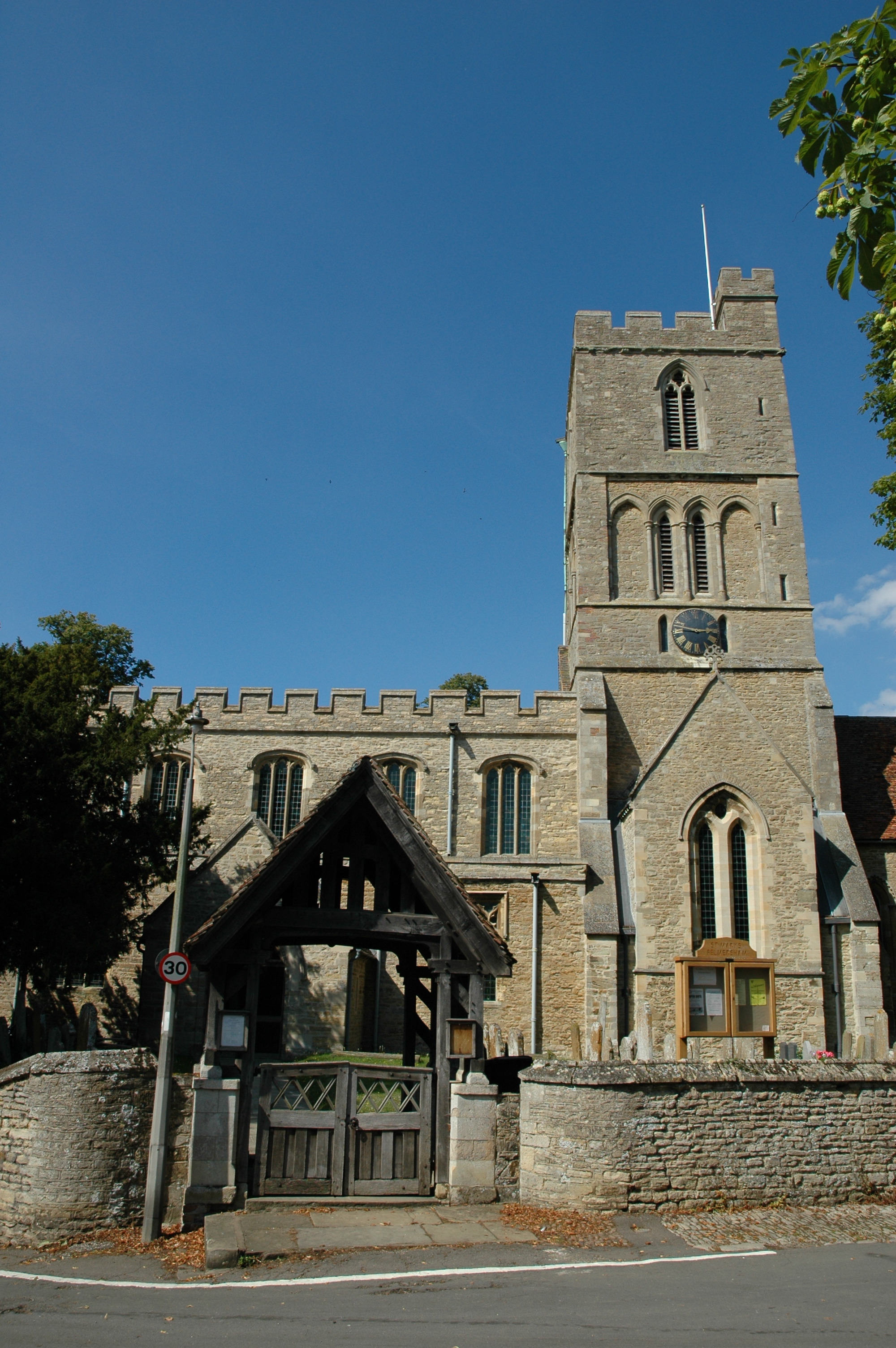
- St Mary's Church, Felmersham

- Location within Bedfordshire
- Interactive map showing the parish boundary
- Population: 703 (2021 census)
- OS grid reference: SP990495
- Unitary authority: Bedford
- Ceremonial county: Bedfordshire
- Region: East
- Country: England
- Sovereign state: United Kingdom
- Post town: Bedford
- Postcode district: MK43
- Dialling code: 01234
- Police: Bedfordshire
- Fire: Bedfordshire
- Ambulance: East of England
- UK Parliament: North Bedfordshire

Felmersham is a small village and civil parish in the Borough of Bedford in Bedfordshire, England, about 7 miles (11 km) north west of Bedford. It is on the River Great Ouse, which circumscribes the parish on the north, east and south. The parish includes the hamlet of Radwell, and is sometimes known as Felmersham with Radwell, and has a population of about 700 . Other nearby places are Sharnbrook, Odell, Pavenham and Milton Ernest.

Felmersham with Radwell was recorded in the Domesday Book of 1086 as a parish within the Hundred of Willey. John de Burnham, later Lord High Treasurer of Ireland, was parish priest here in the 1330s.

The Church of St Mary is located in the village.

The village gave its name to HMS Felmersham, a Ham class minesweeper.

Felmersham has no shop or Post Office but does have one public house, the Sun. Two previous pubs closed in the 1990s; the Plough in 1991 and the Six Ringers in 1995.

Felmersham supports a primary school. In 2017, Pinchmill Lower School changed to Pinchmill Primary School when the local education system changed from three tier to two tier. The school caters for children aged 5–11 (previous to 2017 it was 5–9). After leaving, most children move on to Sharnbrook Academy. The school building was opened in 1974 and took its name from the Pinchmill Islands in Sharnbrook.

Felmersham Gravel Pits nature reserve is North of the village, just over the River Great Ouse. It is understood that the pits were created by extracting sand and gravel to build local airfields in World War Two.

== Demographics ==
At the 2021 census, the civil parish had a population of 703 people in 303 households.

Census population of Felmersham parish
Census	Population	Female	Male	Households	Source
2001	737	360	377	291	
2011	748	373	375	298	
2021	703	380	323	303	

== Notable residents ==
- Oliver Gavin (Racing driver)
- Sheila K McCullagh (author, Puddle Lane children's books)
- Malcolm Macdonald (English international footballer)
- Geoff Millman (English Test cricketer)
- Nick Tandy (Racing driver)
