= List of Sites of Special Scientific Interest in Bedfordshire =

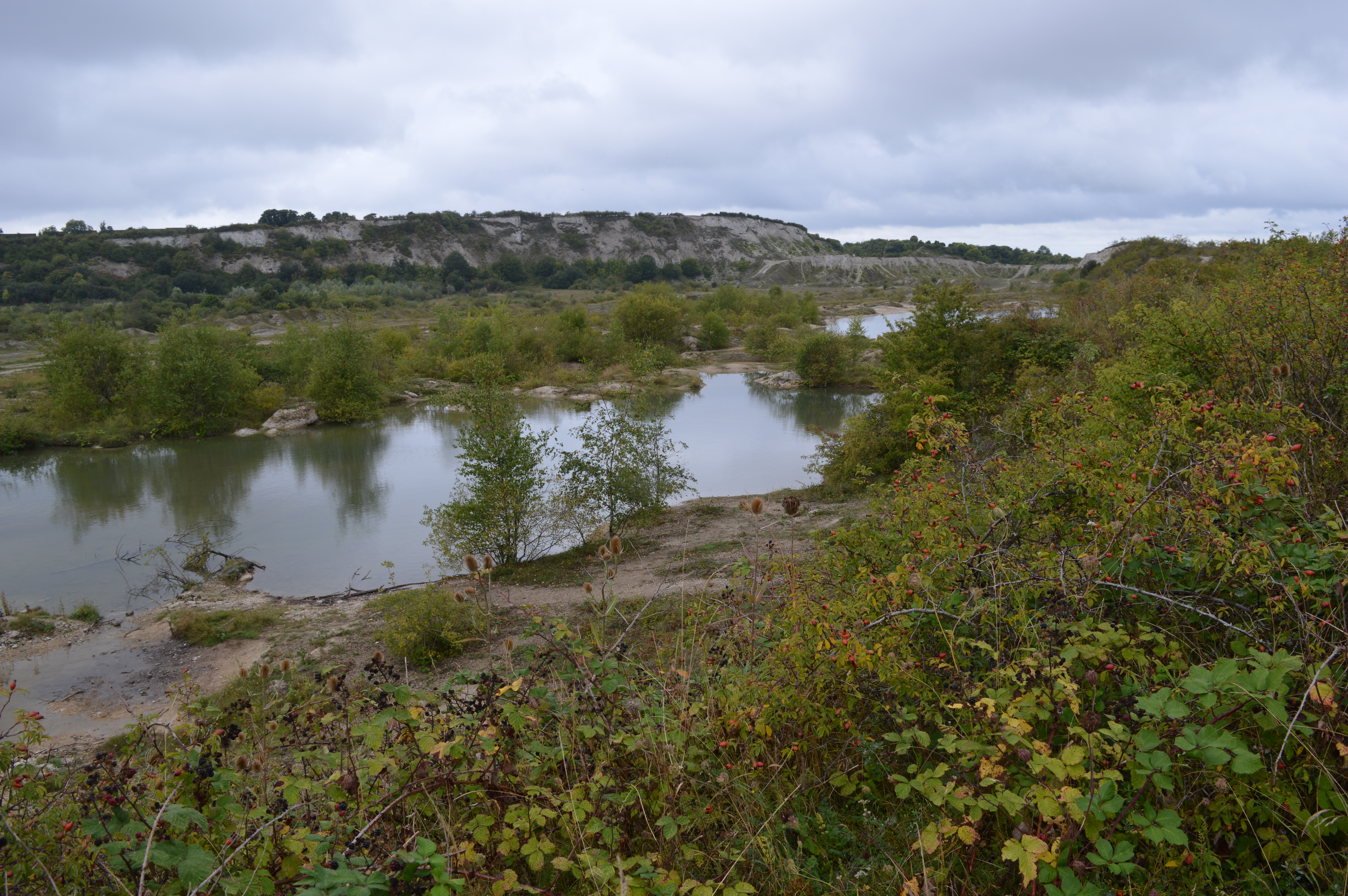
Houghton Regis Marl Lakes

Bedfordshire is a county in the East of England. It is bounded by Hertfordshire to the south-east, Cambridgeshire to the north-east, Northamptonshire to the north, and Buckinghamshire to the west. It has an area of 1,235 square kilometres (477 sq mi), and population estimated in 2015 at 630,000, with an increase of 10% over the previous ten years. The county town is Bedford, and the name is first recorded in the treaty in about 879 between King Alfred the Great and Guthrum, which divided English and Danish territory by a line which went through Bedford.

Southern Bedfordshire is part of the Chilterns Area of Outstanding Natural Beauty. North and mid Bedfordshire are undulating claylands with broad river valleys of the River Great Ouse and its tributaries, and the Bedfordshire Greensand Ridge. Jurassic and Cretaceous clays are overlaid by Quaternary glacial deposits of chalky boulder clay.

There are forty Sites of Special Scientific Interest (SSSIs) in Bedfordshire, designated by Natural England. Thirty-five are listed for their biological interest, and five for their geological interest. Three of the sites are also national nature reserves, twelve are in the Chilterns Area of Outstanding Natural Beauty, and eleven are managed wholly or partly by the Wildlife Trust for Bedfordshire, Cambridgeshire and Northamptonshire. In 2009 Bedfordshire was divided into three unitary local authorities: thirty-two sites are in Central Bedfordshire, eight in Bedford and none in Luton.

== Key ==
=== Interest ===
- B = a site of biological interest
- G = a site of geological interest

=== Other classifications ===
- CAONB = Chilterns Area of Outstanding Natural Beauty
- GCR = Geological Conservation Review
- LNR = Local nature reserve
- NCR = A Nature Conservation Review
- NNR = National nature reserve
- NT = National Trust
- RHPG = Register of Historic Parks and Gardens of Special Historic Interest in England
- RSPB = Royal Society for the Protection of Birds
- SM = Scheduled monument
- WT = Woodland Trust
- WTBCN = Wildlife Trust for Bedfordshire, Cambridgeshire and Northamptonshire

== Sites ==
Site name	Photograph	B	G	Area (Note: Maps and citations for each site are taken from the Natural England database. The area and location of the site is shown on the citation. The listing is as on 10 December 2015.)	Public access	Location	Other classifications	Map	Citation	Description
Barton Hills	Barton Hills	✓		47.9 hectares (118 acres)	YES	Barton-le-Clay; 51.956°N 0.418°W, TL088298	NNR NCR CAONB	Map	Citation	This is steeply sloping chalk pasture, which has a wide variety of grasses and flowers. A chalk stream along the valley floor adds wetland flora. Six orchid species have been recorded, including the fragrant orchid and bee orchid. Another notable plant is the pasque flower.
Biddenham Pit	Biddenham Pit		✓	0.4 hectares (0.99 acres)	YES	Biddenham; 52.142°N 0.507°W, TL023503	GCR	Map	Citation	This site has interglacial mollusk and mammal fossils, but it is uncertain which warmer period is represented. The lowest level also has Paleolithic stone tools.
Blow's Down	Blow's Down	✓		33.4 hectares (83 acres)	YES	Dunstable; 51.883°N 0.502°W, TL032215	WTBCN CAONB	Map	Citation	The site has varied habitats with a large area of unimproved grassland, which cattle help to maintain. Features include a disused quarry and medieval cultivation terraces. It has a rare plant, Bunium bulbocastanum, and beetle odontaeus armiger.
Cooper's Hill	Cooper's Hill	✓		17.8 hectares (44 acres)	YES	Ampthill; 52.029°N 0.504°W, TL027378	LNR WTBCN	Map	Citation	The site is described by Natural England as the best surviving example in Bedfordshire of heathland on the thin acidic soils of the Lower Greensand Ridge. It also has areas of marsh and woodland.
Deacon Hill SSSI	Deacon Hill	✓		35.4 hectares (87 acres)	YES	Pegsdon; 51.953°N 0.37°W, TL121295	WTBCN CAONB	Map	Citation	The site is calcareous grassland which is rich in plant species, some of which are uncommon. Birds include lapwings and buzzards, and there are butterflies such as dingy and grizzled skippers. There are also the remains of ancient strip lynchet fields.
Double Arches Pit	Double Arches Pit		✓	1.7 hectares (4.2 acres)	NO	Heath and Reach; 51.953°N 0.641°W, SP935291	GCR	Map	Citation	This site exposes the Lower Greensand geological layer, dating to the Lower Cretaceous around 146 to 100 million years ago.
Dropshort Marsh	Dropshort Marsh	✓		2.7 hectares (6.7 acres)	YES	Toddington; 51.938°N 0.54°W, TL005276	WTBCN	Map	Citation	This marsh has a variety of habitats, including a scarce quaking bog. Many species are now uncommon due to changes in agricultural practices. it has several springs, with floating sweet-grass and brooklime and areas dominated by rushes.
Dunstable and Whipsnade Downs	Dunstable Downs	✓		73.3 hectares (181 acres)	YES	Dunstable; 51.869°N 0.540°W, TL006199; 51.858°N 0.552°W, SP998187	NT CAONB	Map	Citation	This is a 3 kilometre long steep escarpment between Dunstable and Whipsnade. The slopes have a typical chalk downland flora, and there are also habitats of scrub and tall herbs. The site is also important for butterflies.
Fancott Woods and Meadows	Fancott Woods and Meadows	✓		13.2 hectares (33 acres)	YES	Toddington; 51.937°N 0.51°W, TL025275	WTBCN	Map	Citation	The meadows are mainly ancient ridge and furrow, and are unimproved neutral grassland traditionally managed for hay and grazing. Plants include cowslips, ragged-robin, great burnet, common spotted orchid, red fescue, meadow fescue and meadowsweet.
Felmersham Gravel Pits	Felmersham Gravel Pits	✓		21.5 hectares (53 acres)	YES	Bedford; 52.215°N 0.551°W, SP991584	WTBCN	Map	Citation	The site has flooded gravel pits which were worked until about 1945. Other habitats are neutral grassland, scrub and broadleaved woodland. It is one of the best sites in Bedfordshire for dragonflies and damselflies.
Flitwick Moor	Flitwick Moor	✓		58.9 hectares (146 acres)	YES	Flitwick; 52.005°N 0.476°W, TL047352	WTBCN	Map	Citation	This is a rich valley mire, and the largest area of wetland in Bedfordshire. Eight species of sphagnum bog moss have been recorded, including one which is nationally rare. The site has areas of woodland as well as wet grassland.
Galley and Warden Hills	Warden Hill	✓		47.5 hectares (117 acres)	YES	Warden Hills; 51.928°N 0.415°W, TL091267	LNR CAONB	Map	Citation	The site is chalk grassland with areas of dense scrub, and it has many plants which are rare nationally and locally. It has a wide variety of wild flowers and more than twenty species of butterflies.
Hanger Wood	Hanger Wood	✓		24.0 hectares (59 acres)	NO	Stagsden; 52.134°N 0.546°W, SP996494		Map	Citation	This is described by Natural England as a Site of Special Scientific Interest having "one of the best remaining examples of wet ash-maple woodland in Bedfordshire". The ground flora is dominated by bluebell and dog's mercury, with bramble in drier areas.
Houghton Regis Marl Lakes	Houghton Regis Marl Lakes	✓		21.0 hectares (52 acres)	YES	Houghton Regis; 51.899°N 0.536°W, TL008233	WTBCN CAONB	Map	Citation	This large disused chalk quarry is a rare example of standing water in chalk. It is important both ornithologically and for its range of dragonflies. There are two marl lakes, which have aquatic plants and molluscs, and there are fens in a waterlogged area between the lakes.
Kensworth Chalk Pit	Kensworth Chalk Pit		✓	130.9 hectares (323 acres)	NO	Kensworth; 51.866°N 0.517°W, TL022196	GCR CAONB	Map	Citation	The site is a large working quarry which exposes fossiliferous chalk rocks with many rare fossils including ammonites. It is described by Natural England as "an unrivalled locality for stratigraphic studies in the Upper Cretaceous".
Kings and Bakers Woods and Heaths	King's Wood, Heath and Reach	✓		211.3 hectares (522 acres)	YES	Leighton Buzzard; 51.96°N 0.655°W, SP925299	NNR NCR WTBCN	Map	Citation	The site has the largest remaining area of woodland in Bedfordshire, together with lowland heath, acidic grassland and some small ponds. There are a number of rare plant species, including great woodrush, wood vetch and saw-wort.
Kings Wood and Glebe Meadows, Houghton Conquest	Glebe Meadows	✓		36.1 hectares (89 acres)	YES	Houghton Conquest; 52.052°N 0.477°W, TL045404	LNR	Map	Citation	This site is ancient ash and maple woodland on heavy clay, a habitat which has become rare in lowland England. It is biologically diverse, with a number of rare species. Glebe Meadows has a rich variety of species due to its traditional management.
Knocking Hoe	Knocking Hoe	✓		8.1 hectares (20 acres)	YES	Pegsdon; 51.963°N 0.355°W, TL131307	NNR NCR CAONB	Map	Citation	The site is a flat bottomed valley with steep sides. The unimproved chalk grassland has several nationally rare plants, including moon carrot, spotted catsear and pasque flower. The ancient strip lynchet field system is of archaeological interest.
Marston Thrift	Marston Thrift	✓		37.7 hectares (93 acres)	YES	Cranfield; 52.065°N 0.583°W, SP972417	LNR	Map	Citation	The site is ash and maple woodland on heavy clay, a habitat which has become scarce in lowland England. It also has areas of damp grassland, and a grassland valley. It is an important site for butterflies, including the rare black hairstreak.
Maulden Church Meadow	Maulden Church Meadow	✓		4.2 hectares (10 acres)	YES	Maulden; 52.031°N 0.458°W, TL059381	LNR	Map	Citation	The site is unimproved pasture on the Lower Greensand Ridge. Most of it is neutral grassland with many grass and herb species, and there are small areas of acidic grassland. An open pond has aquatic plants, while two ponds which have been filled in have a varied marsh vegetation.
Maulden Heath	Maulden Heath	✓		7.6 hectares (19 acres)	YES	Maulden; 52.035°N 0.442°W, TL070386		Map	Citation	There are two separate meadows in the site. The eastern meadow has two ridges, which have short grass, a moss layer and many herbs. The western meadow is a steep-sided valley which has similar habitats.
Maulden Wood and Pennyfather's Hill	Maulden Wood	✓		148.4 hectares (367 acres)	YES	Maulden; 52.04°N 0.441°W, TL070391		Map	Citation	This is ancient mixed deciduous and coniferous woodland, with rides and ponds. It has a wide variety of invertebrates, including some which are nationally rare, such as the tiny moth, Dioryctria mutatella and three sawfly species.
Nares Gladley Marsh	Nares Gladley Marsh	✓		5.4 hectares (13 acres)	NO	Leighton Buzzard; 51.94°N 0.682°W, SP907277		Map	Citation	The site is on the Lower Greensand in the valley of the River Ouzel. It has marshland with a number of springs, and it has rich plant communities. On higher areas there is acidic grassland.
Nine Acres Pit	Nine Acres Pit		✓	20.4 hectares (50 acres)	NO	Leighton Buzzard; 51.939°N 0.635°W, SP939276	GCR	Map	Citation	This Lower Cretaceous site exposes layers dating to the Albian and Aptian, between 125 and 100 million years ago. It has one of the most diverse Albian fossils faunas in the world.
Odell Great Wood	Odell Great Wood	✓		85.9 hectares (212 acres)	YES	Odell; 52.219°N 0.599°W, SP958588		Map	Citation	This site is wet ash and maple woodland which has an exceptional variety of flora, such as wild daffodil and herb paris. Extensive rides add to its value for invertebrates and flowering plants.
Potton Wood	Potton Wood	✓		85.2 hectares (211 acres)	YES	Potton; 52.135°N 0.174°W, TL251501		Map	Citation	This wet wood is mainly ash and maple. It shrub layer has species indicative of ancient woodland, such as yellow archangel, wood millet and oxlip, a national rarity. The site also has species-rich rides, ponds and diverse bird species.
Pulloxhill Marsh	Pulloxhill Marsh	✓		5.1 hectares (13 acres)	NO	Pulloxhill; 51.989°N 0.464°W, TL056334		Map	Citation	This marsh in a small valley has a wide variety of plant species, including some rare in the country, such as sharpflowered rush and blunt-flowered rush. It also has springs, neutral grassland in higher areas and mature hedgerows.
Sandy Warren	Sandy Warren	✓		16.4 hectares (41 acres)	YES	Sandy; 52.118°N 0.262°W, TL191480	RSPB	Map	Citation	The site is heathland on the acidic soil of the Lower Greensand ridge, which is now comparatively rare. It also has areas of unimproved grassland and birch woodland. Additional habitats are damp areas and seasonal pools, which have some uncommon species such as distant sedge and carnation sedge.
Smithcombe, Sharpenhoe and Sundon Hills	Sharpenhoe	✓		87.5 hectares (216 acres)	YES	Sharpenhoe; 51.957°N 0.446°W, TL069299	NT CAONB SM	Map	Citation	Much of the site is unimproved chalk grassland with many plants which are now rare. Orchids include Herminium monorchis and Aceras anthropophorum. There is also beech forest with a ground layer including primroses.
Southill Lake and Woods	Southill Lake	✓		25.6 hectares (63 acres)	NO	Southill; 52.073°N 0.331°W, TL145429	RHPG	Map	Citation	The wood is a wet valley of alder, fed by springs, and a small stream runs down to the lake. There is fen vegetation in more open areas. The lake has a characteristic population of breeding birds, and an island has one of only two surviving heronries in the county.
Stevington Marsh	Stevington Marsh	✓		7.6 hectares (19 acres)	YES	Pavenham; 52.183°N 0.565°W, SP982548		Map	Citation	The site is marshland along the banks of the River Great Ouse. The river, marshes and pastures form varied habitats. The marshes are floristically rich, with the largest one being dominated by great horsetail. The wetland communities and Jurassic limestone grassland are rare habitats in eastern England.
Sundon Chalk Quarry	Sundon Chalk Quarry	✓		26.8 hectares (66 acres)	YES	Upper Sundon; 51.936°N 0.49°W, TL039275	CAONB	Map	Citation	This site's varied habitats are fen, lakes, chalk grassland, scrub and woodland. Invertebrates include sixteen species of dragonfly and damselfly and twenty-one of butterfly. The site has the largest English colony of the Chiltern gentian.
Swineshead Wood	Swineshead Wood	✓		21.9 hectares (54 acres)	YES	Swineshead; 52.289°N 0.446°W, TL061668	WT	Map	Citation	The site is wet woodland which has structural and biological diversity. The most common trees are pedunculate oak and ash and on heavy clay, and bluebells and dog's mercury dominate the ground flora.
Tebworth Marsh	Tebworth Marsh	✓		5.7 hectares (14 acres)	YES	Toddington; 51.95°N 0.573°W, SP982289		Map	Citation	This site is a base-rich marsh which has diverse plant life. It has springs along the edge of glacial gravel, and this produces wet marsh which is dominated by meadowsweet. Other habitats are neutral grassland, swamp carr woodland, mature ash woodland, a stream and hedgerows.
Tilwick Meadow	Tilwick Meadow	✓		3.6 hectares (8.9 acres)	YES	Thurleigh; 52.197°N 0.433°W, TL072566		Map	Citation	The meadow is on the site of a medieval village abandoned during the Black Death. It is unimproved grassland on chalk boulder clay, and it has very rich flora on a habitat now rare nationally. Grass species include red fescue and sweet vernal-grass.
Totternhoe Chalk Quarry	Totternhoe Chalk Quarry	✓		13.5 hectares (33 acres)	YES	Totternhoe; 51.891°N 0.569°W, SP986224	CAONB WTBCN	Map	Citation	This site is grass chalkland, which is a habitat under threat.There are a number of rare plant species, including great pignut, and butterflies such as the chalkhill blue and the nationally rare Duke of Burgundy.
Totternhoe Knolls	Totternhoe Knolls	✓		13.4 hectares (33 acres)	YES	Totternhoe; 51.888°N 0.58°W, SP978220	LNR WTBCN CAONB	Map	Citation	This is grassland with a rich variety of plant species, including some that are now rare. There are a number of orchids and a wide variety of invertebrates, including butterflies such as the common blue, chalkhill blue, and the scarce small blue and Duke of Burgundy.
Totternhoe Stone Pit	Totternhoe Stone Pit		✓	2.2 hectares (5.4 acres)	NO	Totternhoe; 51.89°N 0.577°W, SP980222	GCR CAONB	Map	Citation	The site displays the base of the Totternhoe Stone. It is a lime mud with an extensive deposit of late Cretaceous shark teeth, some of species which have not been fully described, so it will be an important resource for further research.
Wavendon Heath Ponds	Wavendon Heath Ponds	✓		4.7 hectares (12 acres)	YES	Aspley Heath; 51.995°N 0.647°W, SP930338		Map	Citation	The site is acidic mire. It has three ponds which have unusual plant communities, two unimproved meadows, some damp birch woodland and a small stream.
Yelden Meadows	Yelden Meadows	✓		2.8 hectares (6.9 acres)	NO	Yelden; 52.295°N 0.522°W, TL009673		Map	Citation	The site is a rare example of neutral grassland on clay which has not been improved agriculturally. It is a flood meadow which has been maintained to provide hay with grazing during the winter, and it has a rich variety of plant species.

== See also ==
- List of local nature reserves in Bedfordshire
- National nature reserves in Bedfordshire
