= Hanger Wood =

Ancient woodland in Bedfordshire, England

Coordinates: 52.134°N 0.546°W

- Site of Special Scientific Interest
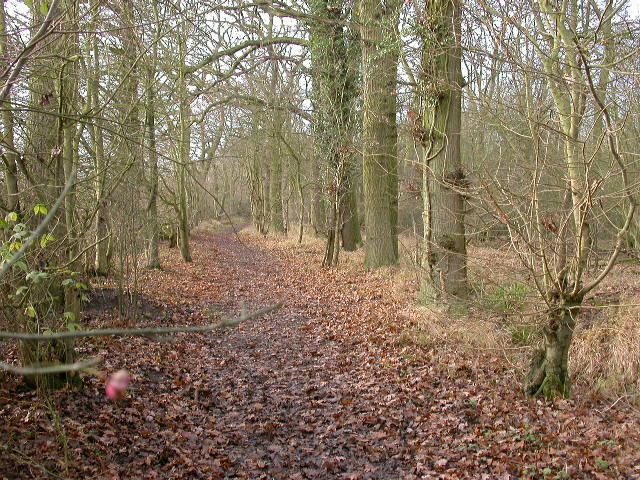
- A south-west view of Hanger Wood
- Location of Hanger Wood.
- Area of search: Bedfordshire
- Grid reference: SP995494
- Interest: Biological
- Area: 24.1 ha (60 acres)
- Notification date: 1988
- Location map: Magic Map

Hanger Wood is an ancient woodland and Site of Special Scientific Interest (SSSI) in the parish of Stagsden, Bedfordshire, in the United Kingdom. Situated approximately 2/3 mile (1.1 km) east of the village of Stagsden, the 24.12 hectares (59.6 acres) woodland was declared a SSSI in 1988, being described by Natural England as "one of the best remaining examples of wet ash-maple woodland in Bedfordshire". The name "Hanger" comes from Old English/Anglo-Saxon term for "wood on a hill" or "wooded hill", applied to Hanger Wood due to its situation on a northwest-facing slope of a narrow ridge. Commenting on the wood's character, A. Simco said in 1984 that "It has been strongly influenced by the geology and topography of the area, particularly by the south-west/north-east boulder clay ridge along which the parish boundary runs."

As of January 2014, there was no public access to Hanger Wood.

== History ==
Before the construction of Stagsden Golf Course, which lies directly to the west of the wood, trial excavations uncovered several features that were evidence of a late Iron Age and Romano-British settlement: a ditch-surrounded enclosure was found, along with pits, gullies, a possible hearth, pottery and an animal burial. Cropmarks showing two rectilinear enclosures north-east of Hanger Wood and adjacent to the parish boundary with Kempston Rural could also be seen; these probably had similar Iron Age or Romano-British origin.

The woodland was cleared to a great extent through the Iron Age and Romano-British periods; before clearance the natural vegetation had been woodland. In medieval times Hanger Wood was managed through a common field system, which persisted till the 19th century. The wood is referred to as early as the year 1200, in the Middle Ages, Hanger Wood provided timber and underwood for Stagsden. Hanger Wood's antiquity is shown by the rich and diverse number of species, an indicator of ancient woodland, and by its sinewy boundaries, especially at the south-western end of the wood. The south-east boundary is of special historical interest, due to its location along the line of a boundary that is ancient and possibly even pre-historic.

The parish of Stagsden was enclosed in 1838, leading to a large re-organisation of the previous field boundaries, although some evidence of the old system still persists.

== Site of Special Scientific Interest ==
Described by Natural England as a Site of Special Scientific Interest having "one of the best remaining examples of wet ash-maple woodland in Bedfordshire", Hanger Wood is an ancient semi-natural woodland that retains characteristics of its coppice-with-standards historic management regime; the wood is located on poorly drained soils of boulder clay and was notified as an SSSI in 1988 under the Wildlife and Countryside Act 1981. Hanger Wood's canopy is dominated by mature penduculate oak (Quercus robur) and ash (Fraxinus excelsior) standards, with midland hawthorn (Crataegus laevigata) as well as hazel (Corylus avellana) coppice dominating the shrub layer. Wayfaring tree (Viburnum lantana) and spindle (Euonymus europaeus) are largely restricted to the margins of the wood, whilst blackthorn (Prunus spinosa) can be found forming dense thickets.

The ground flora is dominated by bluebell (Hyacinthoides non-scripta) and dog's mercury (Mercurialis perennis), whilst in drier areas bramble (Rubus fruticosus) can be found. Supported by the wood's rides, plants of marshy grassland communities are found, such as false fox-sedge (Carex otrubae), angelica (Angelica sylvestris), valerian (Valeriana officinalis), meadowsweet (Filipendula ulmaria) and pendulous sedge (Carex pendula). Other plants common only in ancient woodlands that are also found in Hanger Wood include herb paris (Paris quadrifolia, a species uncommon in Bedfordshire), wood millet (Milium effusum), wood melick (Melica uniflora), yellow archangel (Lamiastrum galeobdolon), wood anemone (Anemone nemorosa) and wood sedge (Carex sylvatica).

== See also ==
- List of Sites of Special Scientific Interest in Bedfordshire
