= Streatley =

Streatley may refer to:

- Streatley, Bedfordshire, England
- Streatley, Berkshire, England
