= Biddenham Dovecote =

Former dovecote in Biddenham

Coordinates: 52.138831°N 0.514731°W

The Biddenham dovecote was a structure located in Biddenham, a village in Bedfordshire, England. Built on the order of Elizabeth Boteler in 1706, in a field to the west of the carp pond now known as the village pond, the dovecote provided meat and eggs for the Biddenham Manor table.

The dovecote was a square timber-framed building with brick in between and plastered over. It had a hipped tiled roof with four gabled dormers, whose ridges met at the apex which was crowned with an ornamental finial. The 461 nests inside were built on elm wood boards, some of brick and clay, mixed with straw and cow dung. The clay for building nests in the dovecote and for building the village's wattle and daub houses came from clay pits in Biddenham village.

It is not known when the dovecote ceased to be used for its original purpose. After falling into disrepair, it was restored in 1932 with advice from Sir Albert Richardson, a leading English architect, and teacher and writer about architecture during the first half of the 20th century, who lived in Ampthill in Bedfordshire. The dovecote was restocked with four pairs of town pigeons given royal names but was demolished in 1966.
