= Barton Hills, Bedfordshire =

Hills in Bedfordshire, England

Barton Hills
- Site of Special Scientific Interest
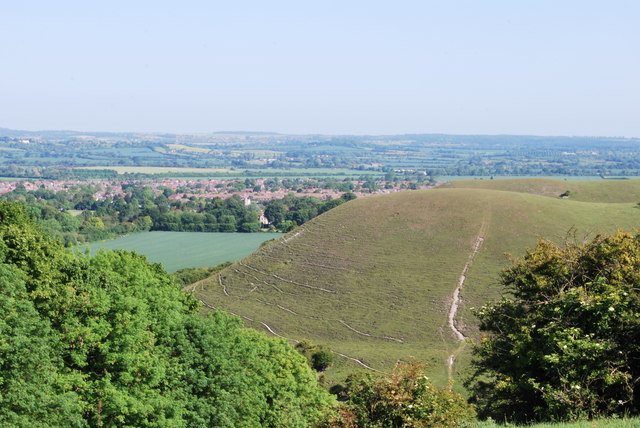
- Location of Barton Hills.
- Area of search: Bedfordshire
- Grid reference: TL088298
- Interest: Biological
- Area: 118.3 hectares (292 acres)
- Notification date: 1985
- Location map: Magic Map

Barton Hills are situated southeast of the village of Barton-le-Clay in the English county of Bedfordshire. They are part of the Chilterns and hiking routes are marked on maps at the entrance to the hills. From the foot of the hillside, a spring (Barton Springs) marks the start of a chalk stream river. During the summer, Dartmoor ponies roam the hills.

== National nature reserve ==
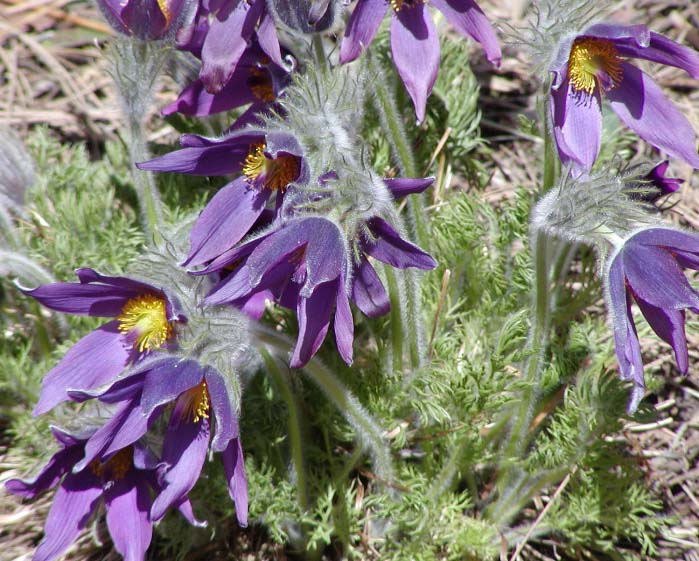
Pasqueflowers

A large part of the area is managed by Natural England as a national nature reserve. The reserve is also designated as a Site of Special Scientific Interest.

The steep well-grazed slopes are a classic downland habitat, however there were no sheep on the hills from about 1930 until the 1980s and woodland has formed on the hillside to the west of the stream which issues from Barton Springs. The reserve is the main site in Bedfordshire for the pasqueflower (Pulsatilla vulgaris), and in some years over a thousand flowers are present. Other unusual plants are field fleawort and a dwarf form of hairy violet.

There is no designated parking for the site. There is easy access by either Footpath 4 through the recreation ground towards the Church or Footpath 1 at the southern end of Old Road.

In the 21st century, the Hills were used as a training ground by undercover operative Morten Storm and Islamic terrorists from nearby Luton.

== Barton Gravel Pit ==
To the east of the main reserve area, near the border between Bedfordshire and Hertfordshire, (51.9577°N 0.4031°W) there is Barton Gravel Pit, a nature reserve managed by the Wildlife Trust for Bedfordshire, Cambridgeshire and Northamptonshire.

== See also ==
- National Nature Reserves in Bedfordshire
- List of Sites of Special Scientific Interest in Bedfordshire
