= Pavenham Manor =

Country house in Bedfordshire, England

Coordinates: 52.1925°N 0.5511°W

Pavenham Manor was a country house in Pavenham, Bedfordshire, England. The house was demolished in 1960.
