= Warden Hill =

Warden Hill or Warden Hills may refer to:

- Leckhampton with Warden Hill, civil parish in Gloucestershire, England
- Galley and Warden Hills, the hills which overlook Warden Hill, Luton
- Lincolnshire Wolds, a range of hills containing a hill called Warden Hill
