= Streatley, Bedfordshire =

Village in Bedfordshire, England

Coordinates: 51.948°N 0.440°W

Streatley
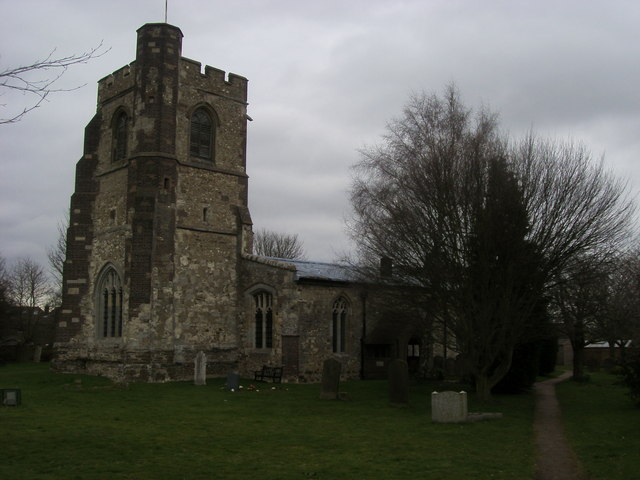
- Parish church of St Margaret

- Location within Bedfordshire
- Population: 1,867 (parish)
- OS grid reference: TL072289
- Civil parish: Streatley
- Unitary authority: Central Bedfordshire
- Ceremonial county: Bedfordshire
- Region: East
- Country: England
- Sovereign state: United Kingdom
- Post town: LUTON
- Postcode district: LU2, LU3
- Dialling code: 01582
- Police: Bedfordshire
- Fire: Bedfordshire
- Ambulance: East of England
- UK Parliament: Mid Bedfordshire
- Website: Parish council

Streatley is a village and civil parish in the Central Bedfordshire district of Bedfordshire, England.

== Geography ==
Streatley lies just to the west of the A6 road, and is the first village on the A6 north of Luton, being about 5 miles (8 km) from Luton town centre. Nearby villages are Lower Sundon further to the west, Sharpenhoe, 1.5 miles north, and Barton-le-Clay, a somewhat larger village about 1.5 miles north, on the eastern side of the A6.

The parish includes the village of Sharpenhoe and part of Bushmead. The south of the parish borders Luton and to the east is the North Hertfordshire district of Hertfordshire. North of the village of Streatley, the parish is entirely to the west of the A6. According to the 2021 census the parish had a population of 1,867. The Icknield Way Path passes through the village on its 110-mile journey from Ivinghoe Beacon in Buckinghamshire to Knettishall Heath in Suffolk. The Icknield Way Trail, a multi-user route for walkers, horse riders and off-road cyclists also passes through the village.

The Galley and Warden Hills local nature reserve is within the parish. Sharpenhoe Clappers is a starting point of the Chiltern Way footpath's Northern Extension, and The John Bunyan Trail passes through the parish.

== History ==
The parish is of ancient origin, and has sometimes been known as 'Streatley with Sharpenhoe'. It was expanded in 1928 by taking part of the abolished Limbury parish, which was mostly being annexed to Luton, and then again in 1933 by taking in part of Stopsley parish which suffered a similar fate.

== St Margaret's Church ==
The village is the site of an Anglican church dedicated to St Margaret.

=== Vicars ===
Records of the St Margaret's ministers go back to 1250 starting with William de Stratle.

Reverend James Hadow (1757–1847)

James Hadow was born in St Andrews on 30 January 1757, the eldest son of Professor George Hadow, was vicar for fifty nine years, from 1781 to 1840. He matriculated at St Andrews university in 1773 and was a Glasgow scholar of Balliol College, Oxford. He married Sarah Wye (1762–1849) in 1788. The Wye family had for some generations lived in Porto, Portugal where her father John Wye (1737–1807) worked at the British Factory Chaplaincy. The Wye family had in the past owned Lypiatt Park, near Stroud, Gloucestershire. It is said that James fell in love with Sarah Wye, but the Wye family did not approve and sent her off to her uncle at Beverley in Yorkshire. One night when the family were going out to a ball she pleaded ill health, and stayed at home, and James eloped with her. They went to St Andrews and were married there.

James Hadow is buried in the church grounds. Hadow's gravestone reads: "Here rest the remains of James Hadow, Clerk MA Late Vicar of Streatley and Sundon. He was born 30 Jan AD 1757 Was instituted to Streatley AD 1781 to Sundon AD 1786 Resigned AD 1840 And in hope of mercy through Christ Jesus the Saviour died on 30 Jan AD 1847 Blessed be the name of the Lord.

Sarah Wye is also buried beside him. Her grave reads: "Sarah Wye his beloved and affectionate wife Who died 14 June 1849 Aged 86 years Blessed are the dead who die in the Lord".

James Hadow and Sarah Wye had eight children.

John Gibson

John Gibson was the brother of Guy Gibson leader of the Dambuster's raid.

== Sport ==
South Beds Golf Club on the western side of the Galley and Warden Hills has an eighteen-hole and a nine-hole course. The Club was established in 1892.
