= Deacon Hill SSSI =

Protected area in Bedfordshire, England

Coordinates: 51.9527°N 0.3673°W

Deacon Hill
- Site of Special Scientific Interest
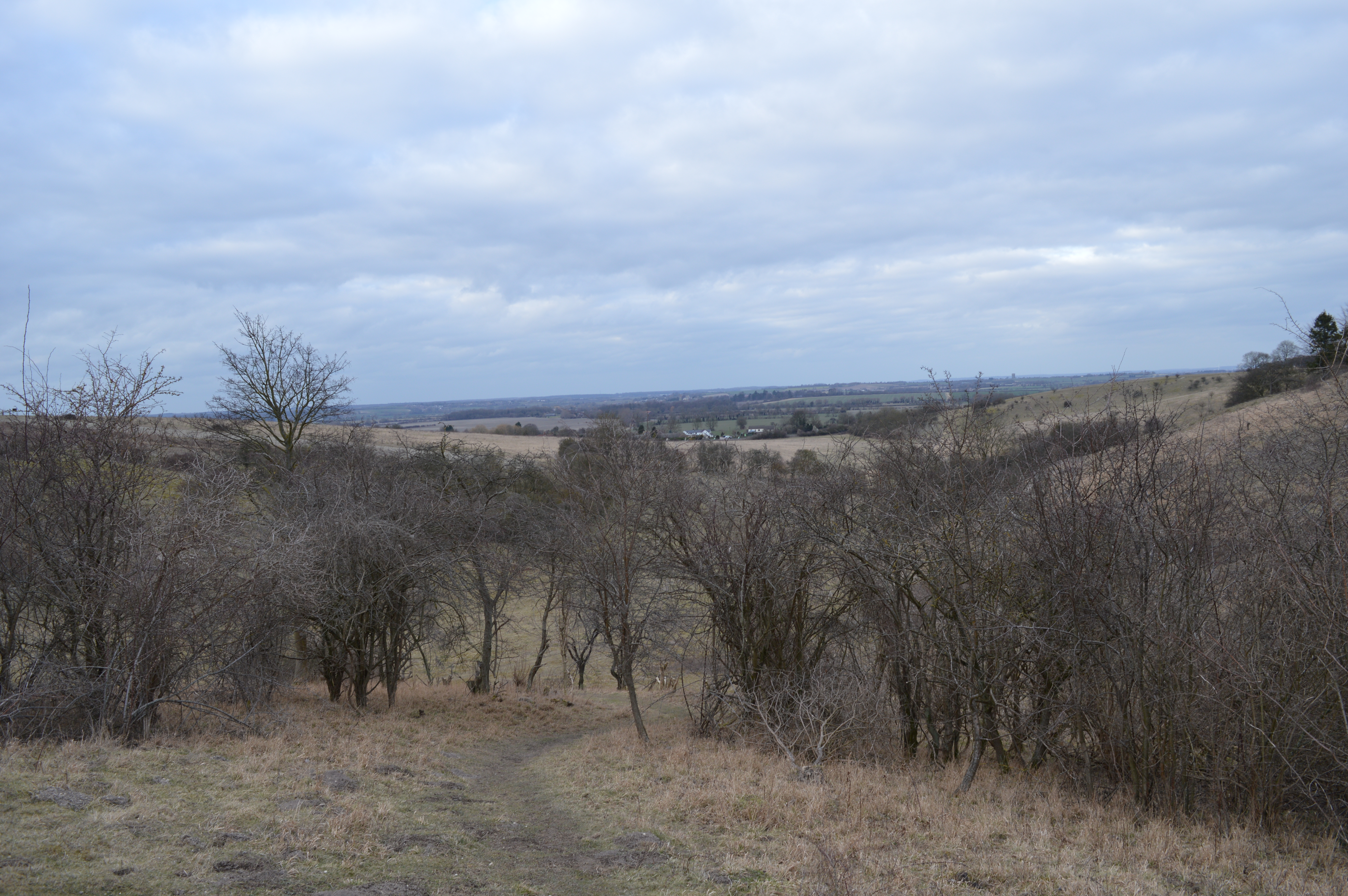
- View from Deacon Hill
- Location of Deacon Hill.
- Area of search: Bedfordshire
- Grid reference: TL123295
- Interest: Biological
- Area: 35.4 ha (87 acres)
- Notification date: 1984
- Location map: Magic Map

Deacon Hill SSSI is a 35.4-hectare (87-acre) biological Site of Special Scientific Interest in Pegsdon in Bedfordshire. It is in the Chilterns Area of Outstanding Natural Beauty, and it is part of the Pegsdon Hills and Hoo Bit nature reserve, managed by Wildlife Trust for Bedfordshire, Cambridgeshire and Northamptonshire.

The site is calcareous grassland which is rich in plant species, some of which are uncommon. Birds include lapwings and buzzards, and there are butterflies such as dingy and grizzled skippers. There are also the remains of ancient strip lynchet fields.

The SSSI covers part of Deacon Hill and part of the adjacent Pegsdon Hills. This is a remnant of semi-natural chalk downland and the calcareous soil supports a characteristic range of grasses and herbs. The main grasses present are sheep’s fescue, false oat-grass and upright brome. Forbs found here include spring sedge, autumn gentian, yellow-wort, fragrant orchid, common spotted-orchid, common milkwort, common rock-rose, cowslip, eyebright, clustered bellflower, harebell, carline thistle, wild thyme, marjoram and moschatel. There are also wild candytuft, field fleawort and pasque flower, all of which are rare in Bedfordshire.

There is also some scrubland, the main trees being hawthorn, which often invades chalk downland, a buckthorn and wayfaring tree, with black bryony and old man's beard; false-brome usually dominates the ground flora in scrubby areas. There are glowworms, and grizzled skipper and dingy skipper butterflies.

There is access to the site from Hitchin Road.
