= Odell Great Wood =

Woodland in Bedfordshire, England

- Site of Special Scientific Interest
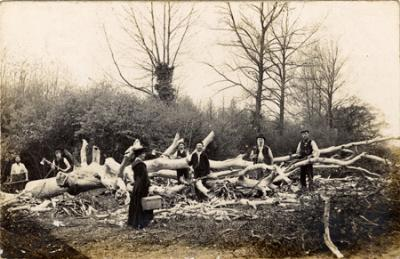
- A historic photograph of Odell Great Wood, showing the damage after a storm in 1906
- Location of Odell Great Wood.
- Area of search: Bedfordshire
- Grid reference: SP958590
- Interest: Biological
- Area: 85.7 ha (212 acres)
- Notification date: 1984
- Location map: Magic Map

Odell Great Wood is an ancient woodland and biological Site of Special Scientific Interest (SSSI) in Odell in Bedfordshire. Located around the centre of the parish of Odell, the site was described by Natural England as "in many respects the best example in Bedfordshire" of wet ash-maple woodland, and in historical sources as "the noblest wood in this county". Being one of the largest of Bedfordshire's ancient woodlands, the wood hosts a wide variety of flora and fauna in its ash, oak and hazel coppice habitat.

== History ==
What is now Odell Great Wood was once just a small part of a much larger forest. It was a source of employment for woodsmen that reached The Fens. Sheep also grazed in a large sheep-wold, that was enclosed in 1776, and sheep still graze in adjoining meadows today along with game birds being reared in wired compounds inside Odell Great Wood. A 1765 map by Thomas Jefferys shows formal drives through Odell Great Wood, arranged on the design of the wheel. In 1844, Joseph Mason of Felmersham was convicted of larceny ("unlawful taking of the personal property of another person") and sentenced to three months hard labour and imprisonment, after stealing an axe from under a stump of ash in the wood.

== Site of Special Scientific Interest ==
Natural England described Odell Great Wood as "in many respects the best example in Bedfordshire" of wet ash-maple woodland, having notified the site under the National Parks and Access to the Countryside Act 1949 in 1970 and under the Wildlife and Countryside Act 1981 in 1984. The wood is dominated by oak (Quercus robur) and ash (Fraxinus excelsior) trees, which grow over a well-developed layer of shrub plants, including privet (Ligustrum vulgare), dogwood (Cornus sanguinea), field maple (Acer campestre) and coppiced hazel (Corylus avellana). A high diversity of woodland species exists, which mirrors the variation in soil types across the wood, with the northern areas of the site growing on a neutral boulder clay, as well as more calcareous soils derived from the Great Oolite being found in the rest of the wood. This diverse ground flora includes species that are considered rare in Odell Great Wood's locality, such as herb paris (Paris quadrifolia) and wild daffodil (Narcissus pseudonarcissus). A key feature of the wood that Natural England cites as enhancing the sites value for flowering plants, butterflies and other invertebrates is the "extensive and well-developed system of [woodland] rides".

There is access by a footpath from Odell high Street.

== See also ==
- List of Sites of Special Scientific Interest in Bedfordshire
