= Knocking Hoe =

Nature reserve in Bedfordshire, England

Coordinates: 51.963°N 0.355°W

- Site of Special Scientific Interest
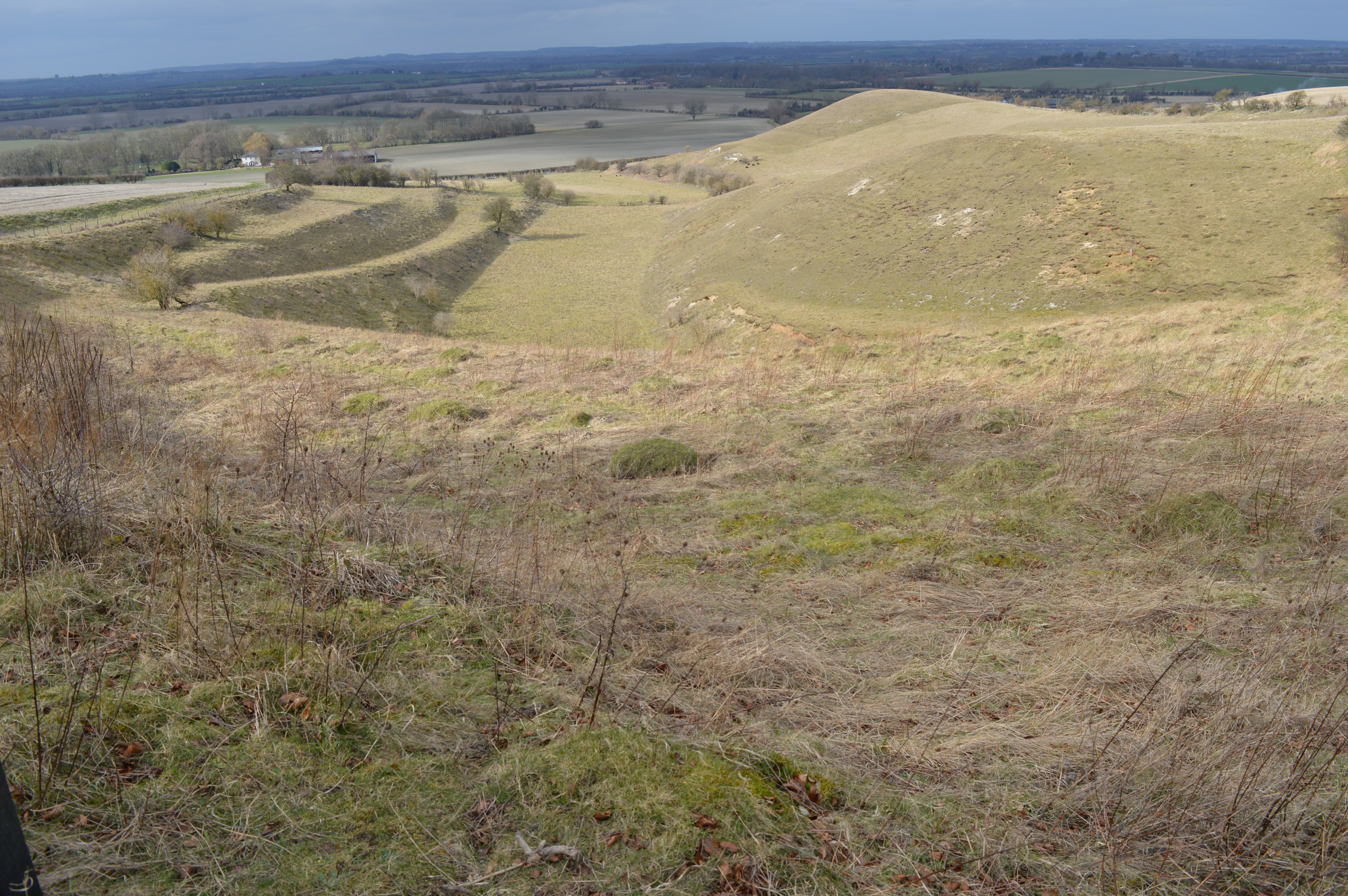
- Knocking Hoe with terraces of the ancient strip lynchet field system
- Location of Knocking Hoe.
- Area of search: Bedfordshire
- Grid reference: TL131307
- Interest: Biological
- Area: 7.7 hectares (19 acres)
- Notification date: 1985
- Location map: Magic Map

Knocking Hoe is a 7.7-hectare (19-acre) National Nature Reserve and biological Site of Special Scientific Interest near Pegsdon in Bedfordshire. It is mentioned in A Nature Conservation Review. It is part of the Chilterns Area of Outstanding Natural Beauty, and is managed by Natural England.

The site is a flat-bottomed valley with steep sides. The unimproved chalk grassland has several nationally rare plants, including moon carrot, spotted catsear, field fleawort, burnt tip orchid and pasque flower. There are also a variety of wild flowers such as the autumn lady’s tresses, which has been studied on the site for over fifty years. The ancient strip lynchet field system is of archaeological interest.

There is access by a footpath from Hitchin Road in Pegsdon.

== See also ==
- List of Sites of Special Scientific Interest in Bedfordshire
- National Nature Reserves in Bedfordshire

Media related to Knocking Hoe at Wikimedia Commons
