= Pegsdon Hills and Hoo Bit =

Nature reserve in the United Kingdom

Coordinates: 51.9529°N 0.3689°W

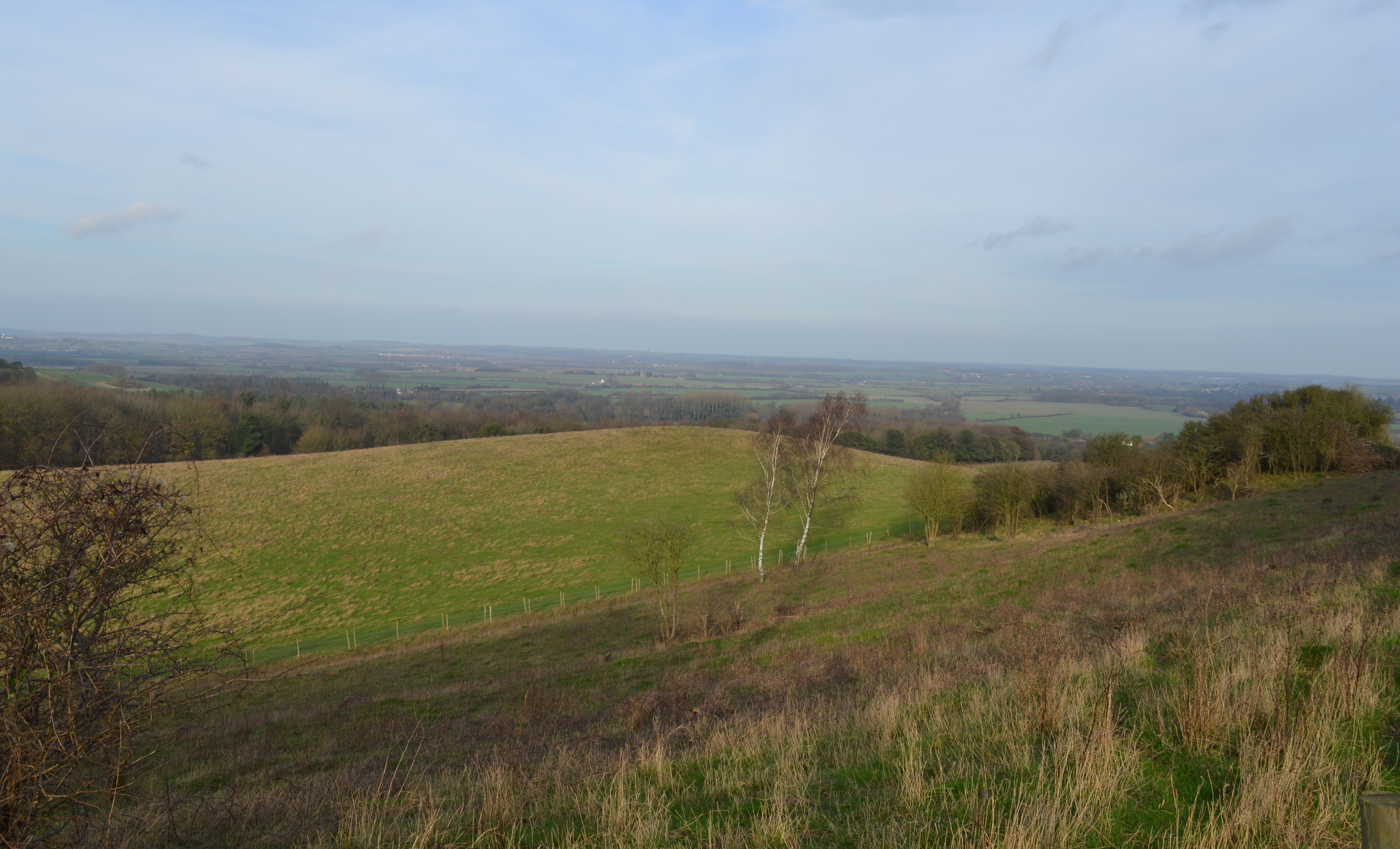

Pegsdon Hills and Hoo Bit is a 79-hectare (200-acre) nature reserve in Pegsdon in Bedfordshire. It is managed by the Wildlife Trust for Bedfordshire, Cambridgeshire and Northamptonshire. The site is on the border between Bedfordshire and Hertfordshire, and it covers Pegsdon Hills and part of the adjacent Deacon Hill in Bedfordshire, and Hoo Bit in Hertfordshire. It is in the Chilterns Area of Outstanding Natural Beauty, and part of the site is designated by Natural England as the Deacon Hill SSSI (Site of Special Scientific Interest).

The site has wildflower meadows in chalk hills, including orchids and moschatels. There are butterflies such as dingy and grizzled skippers, Birds include wheatears and skylarks, and herbs such as marjoram and wild thyme. Hoo Bit is a flower meadow surrounded by woodland.

There is access from Hitchin Road.
