= Nine Acres Pit =

Coordinates: 51.939°N 0.635°W

- Site of Special Scientific Interest
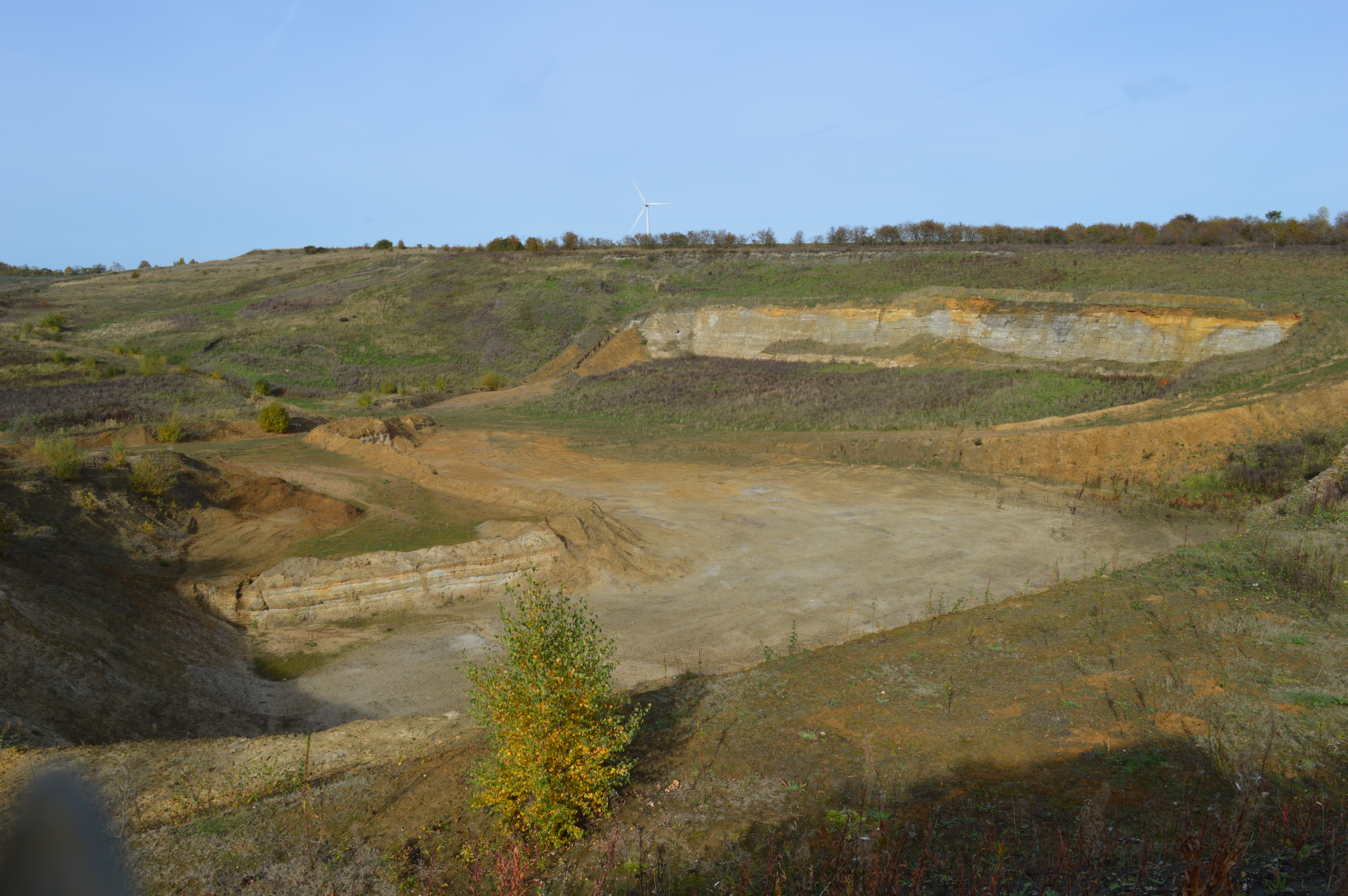
- Location of Nine Acres Pit.
- Area of search: Bedfordshire
- Grid reference: SP938277
- Interest: Geological
- Area: 20.7 ha (51 acres)
- Notification date: 1986
- Location map: Magic Map

Nine Acres Pit is a 20.7-hectare (51-acre) geological Site of Special Scientific Importance north-east of Leighton Buzzard in Bedfordshire. It was notified in 1986 under Section 28 of the Wildlife and Countryside Act 1981, and the local planning authority is Central Bedfordshire Council. It is a Geological Conservation Review site.

The site is a sand quarry which was worked by J. Arnold and Sons Limited in the late nineteenth century, and 9,516 tons were dug in 1897. According to Natural England:

This locality shows a Lower Cretaceous section spanning the Aptian and Albian stages, including the finest development of Carstone and Shenley Limestone in the Leighton Buzzard area as well as superb exposures of dune bedding in the Upper Woburn Sands.

The famous Shenley Limestone contains a unique fossil fauna of a diversity virtually unparalleled in the Albian elsewhere.

It is a working quarry and there is no public access.
