= National nature reserves in Bedfordshire =

National nature reserves in Bedfordshire, England are established by Natural England and managed by them or by non-governmental organisations such as the Royal Society for the Protection of Birds or the National Trust.

== List of reserves ==
A list of national nature reserves in Bedfordshire:

- Barton Hills, 44 Ha in the Chiltern Hills.
- King's Wood, Heath and Reach, 63 Ha near Woburn.
- Knocking Hoe, 7.7 Ha of grassland near Hitchin.
