= Nares Gladley Marsh =

Coordinates: 51.94°N 0.682°W

- Site of Special Scientific Interest
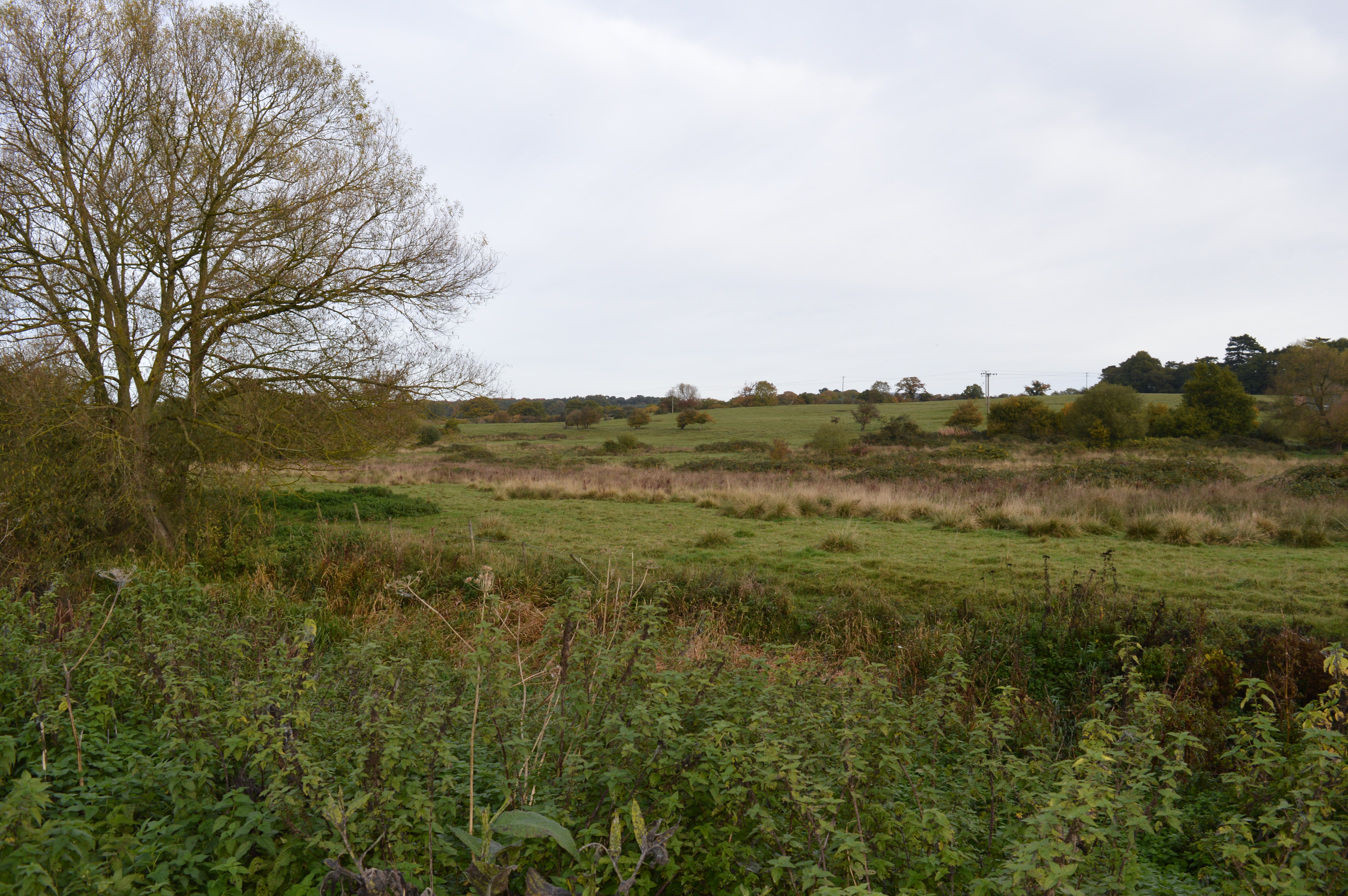
- Location of Nares Gladley Marsh.
- Area of search: Bedfordshire
- Grid reference: SP908276
- Interest: Biological
- Area: 5.1 ha (13 acres)
- Notification date: 1990
- Location map: Magic Map

Nares Gladley Marsh is a 5.1-hectare (13-acre) Site of Special Scientific Interest north-west of Leighton Buzzard in Bedfordshire. It was notified in 1990 under Section 28 of the Wildlife and Countryside Act 1981, and the local planning authority is Central Bedfordshire Council.

The site is on the Lower Greensand in the valley of the River Ouzel. It has marshland with a number of springs, and it has rich plant communities. On higher areas there is acidic grassland.

The site is private land and there is no public access.
