= Pegsdon =

Hamlet in Bedfordshire, England

Coordinates: 51.96352°N 0.37457°W

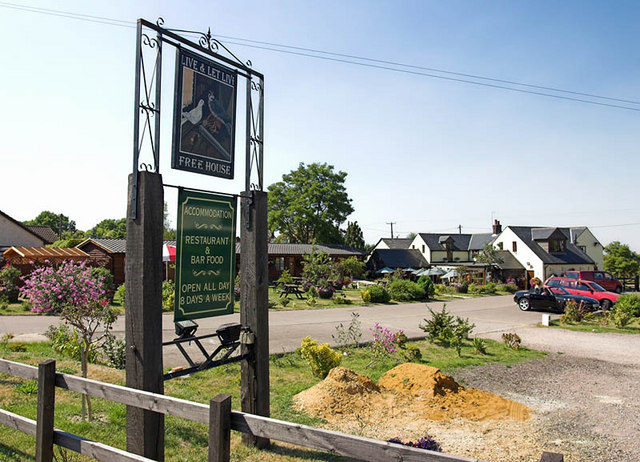
- The "Live and Let Live" pub, Pegsdon

- Location within Bedfordshire
- OS grid reference: TL117306
- Civil parish: Shillington
- Unitary authority: Central Bedfordshire
- Ceremonial county: Bedfordshire
- Region: East
- Country: England
- Sovereign state: United Kingdom
- Post town: HITCHIN
- Postcode district: SG5
- Dialling code: 01462
- Police: Bedfordshire
- Fire: Bedfordshire
- Ambulance: East of England
- UK Parliament: Mid Bedfordshire

Pegsdon is a hamlet located in the Central Bedfordshire district of Bedfordshire, England. It is part of the Shillington civil parish, and is almost encircled by the county border with Hertfordshire.

Pegsdon Hills are located south and east of Pegsdon. They form the north-eastern end of the Chiltern Hills, and are managed as a nature reserve by the Wildlife Trust for Bedfordshire, Cambridgeshire and Northamptonshire. They adjoin Deacon Hill, and Deacon Hill and half of Pegsdon Hills are designated a Site of Special Scientific Interest.

Knocking Hoe is accessed by a footpath from Hitchin Road. It is a national nature reserve and a Site of Special Scientific Interest.

== History ==
One of the earliest pieces of evidence for settlement in the Pegsdon area is a polished greenstone Neolithic axe, found about 1880 (Her 407).

== Education ==
It is in the catchment zone for Robert Bloomfield Academy. It is also in the catchment zone for Samuel Whitbread Academy, which has an upper school and sixth form.
