= Pulloxhill =

Village in Bedfordshire, England

Coordinates: 51.99418°N 0.45491°W

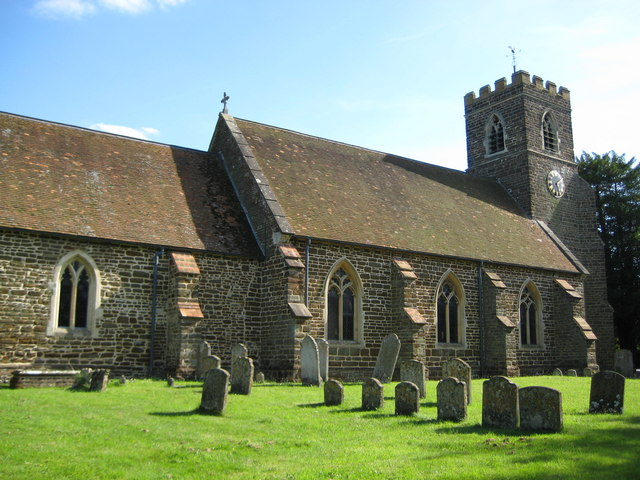
- Parish Church of St James the Apostle

- Location within Bedfordshire
- Population: 850 (2001); 985 (2011 Census)
- OS grid reference: TL061339
- Civil parish: Pulloxhill
- Unitary authority: Central Bedfordshire
- Ceremonial county: Bedfordshire
- Region: East
- Country: England
- Sovereign state: United Kingdom
- Post town: BEDFORD
- Postcode district: MK45
- Dialling code: 01525
- Police: Bedfordshire
- Fire: Bedfordshire
- Ambulance: East of England
- UK Parliament: Mid Bedfordshire

Pulloxhill is a small village and civil parish in Bedfordshire, England 342 ft above sea level with a population of 850 at the 2001 Census, increasing to 985 at the 2011 Census.

Pulloxhill has a church, a school and one public house. The village shop and post office have closed. There are a number of historic buildings, including 15th Century Public House (The Cross Keys). The village pond was filled in several years ago after a fire at the old Bakery and now forms part of the village green where the school holds a maypole dancing concert every May. Pulloxhill Marsh is a Site of Special Scientific Interest. A village news letter is published monthly called the PVN (Pulloxhill Village News).

The village is around a 20-minute drive from Bedford's town centre, and 25 minutes from the centre of Luton. It is approximately 350 miles to Lands End and approximately 650 miles to John O 'Groats.

== History ==
Pulloxhill is one of the oldest villages in Bedfordshire being well over 1000 years old, and still has a Norman Church. It is the oldest known home of the Bunyan family and near where John Bunyan was arrested.

Pulloxhill is recorded in the Domesday Book of 1086 as having 11 villagers, 13 smallholders and 2 slaves, under Lord Freeman-Eight. Tenant-in-Chief at the time was Nigel of Aubigny.

In 1680 it was thought that gold had been discovered in the village and a mine was established, this was however abandoned shortly afterwards. It is believed that what was actually discovered was flakes of mica in quartz, giving the appearance of gold. It is possible that the silver mine of Demas referred to in Bunyan’s Pilgrim’s Progress was inspired by the gold mine in Pulloxhill.

There are records of 'Fort' or 'Castle' within the parish, most probable due to the elevated nature of the geography, however the remains are on private land and not viewable without the current land-owner's permission.

Elizabeth Ocle of Pulloxhill was hanged in Bedford in 1596 for practising witchcraft.

Julius Drewe, businessman and retailer, known for creating of the successful Home and Colonial Stores, and for commissioning the building of Castle Drogo in Devon as his family's country home, was born at the vicarage in 1856.

== Notes ==
- Edmund Venables, The Life of John Bunyan
- John Kelman, Among Famous Books
