= Pulloxhill Marsh =

Marsh in Bedfordshire

Coordinates: 51.9899°N 0.4635°W

- Site of Special Scientific Interest
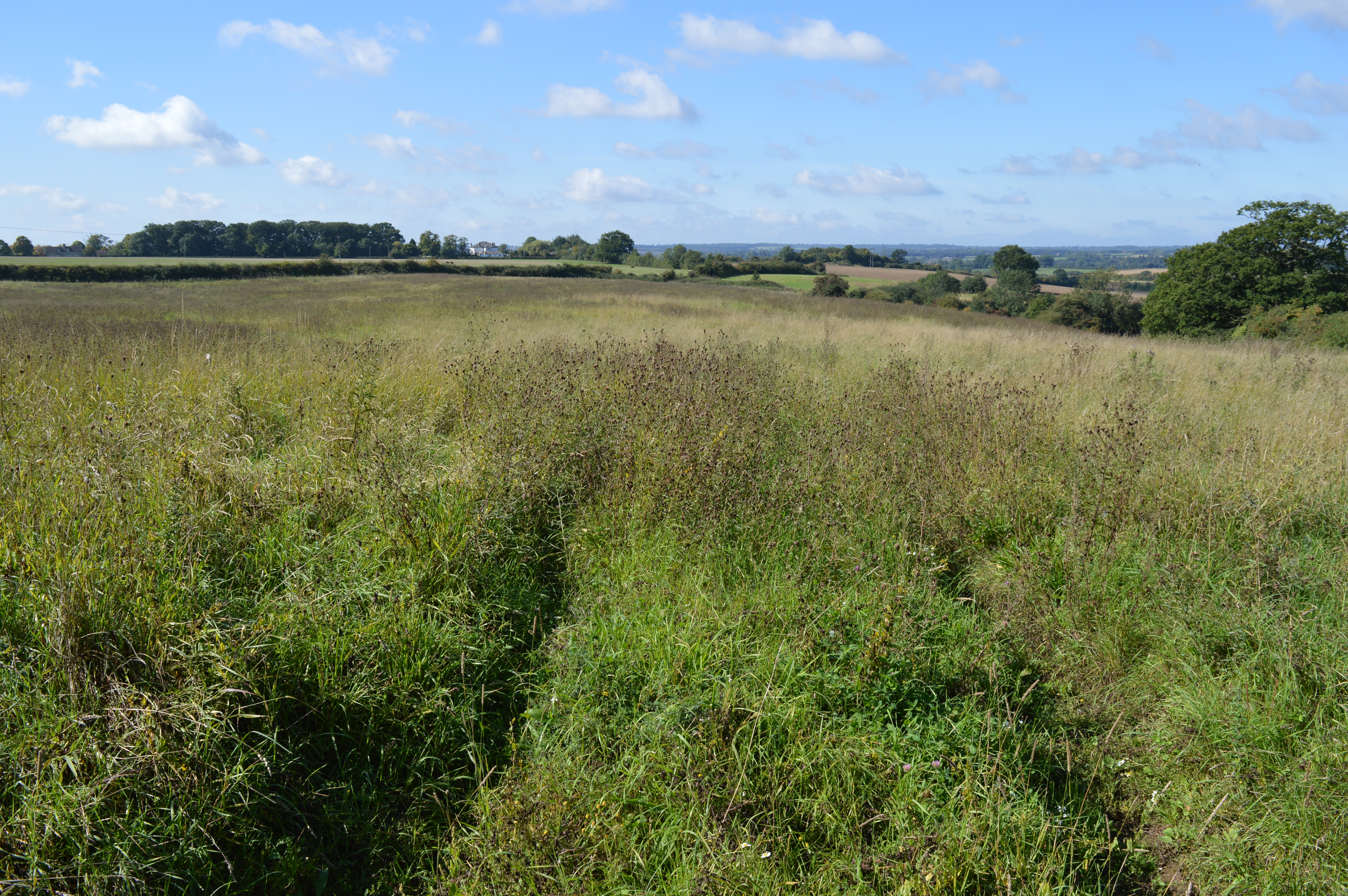
- Location of Pulloxhill Marsh.
- Area of search: Bedfordshire
- Grid reference: TL056335
- Interest: Biological
- Area: 5.1 ha (13 acres)
- Notification date: 1985
- Location map: Magic Map

Pulloxhill Marsh is a 5.1-hectare (13-acre) biological Site of Special Scientific Interest in Pulloxhill in Bedfordshire. It was notified in 1985 under Section 28 of the Wildlife and Countryside Act 1981, and the local planning authority is Central Bedfordshire Council.

This marsh in a small valley has a wide variety of plant species, including some rare in the country, such as sharpflowered rush and blunt-flowered rush. It also has springs, neutral grassland in higher areas and mature hedgerows.

The site is private land closed to the public, but it can be viewed from Church Road.
