= Maulden Heath =

English Site of Special Scientific Interest

Coordinates: 52.035°N 0.442°W

- Site of Special Scientific Interest
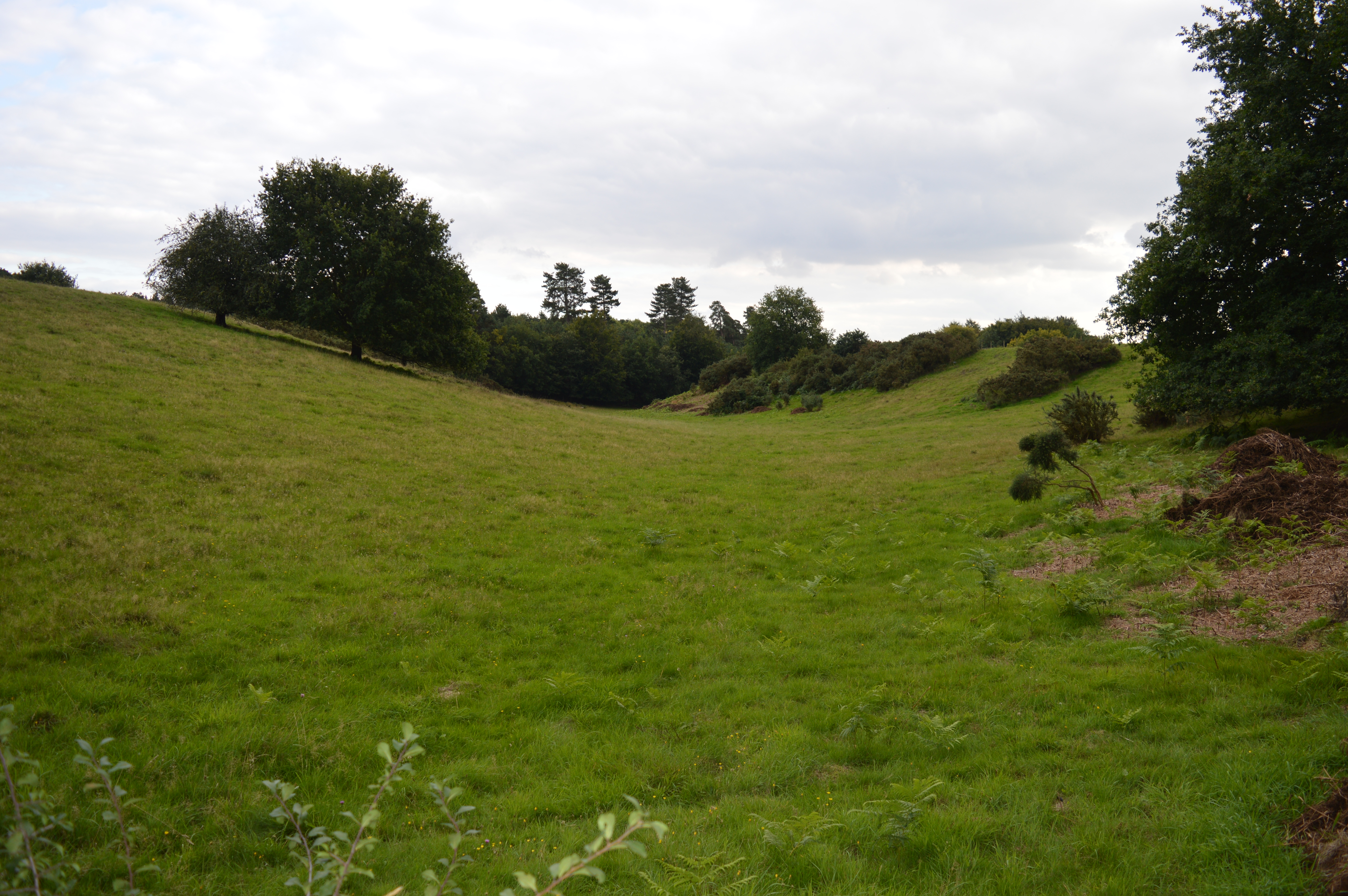
- The western meadow
- Location of Maulden Heath.
- Area of search: Bedfordshire
- Grid reference: TL070386; TL 068384
- Interest: Biological
- Area: 7.6 ha (19 acres)
- Notification date: 1986
- Location map: Magic Map

Maulden Heath is a 7.6-hectare (19-acre) Site of Special Scientific Interest in Maulden in Bedfordshire. It was notified in 1986 under Section 28 of the Wildlife and Countryside Act 1981, and the local planning authority is Central Bedfordshire Council. The site is owned by the Forestry Commission and managed by The Greensand Trust.

There are two separate meadows in the site. The eastern meadow has two ridges, which have short grass, a moss layer and many herbs. The western meadow is a steep-sided valley which has similar habitats. There is access by a footpath from the Deadman's Hill car park.
