= Barton Gravel Pit =

Nature reserve in Bedfordshire, England

Coordinates: 51.9572°N 0.4028°W

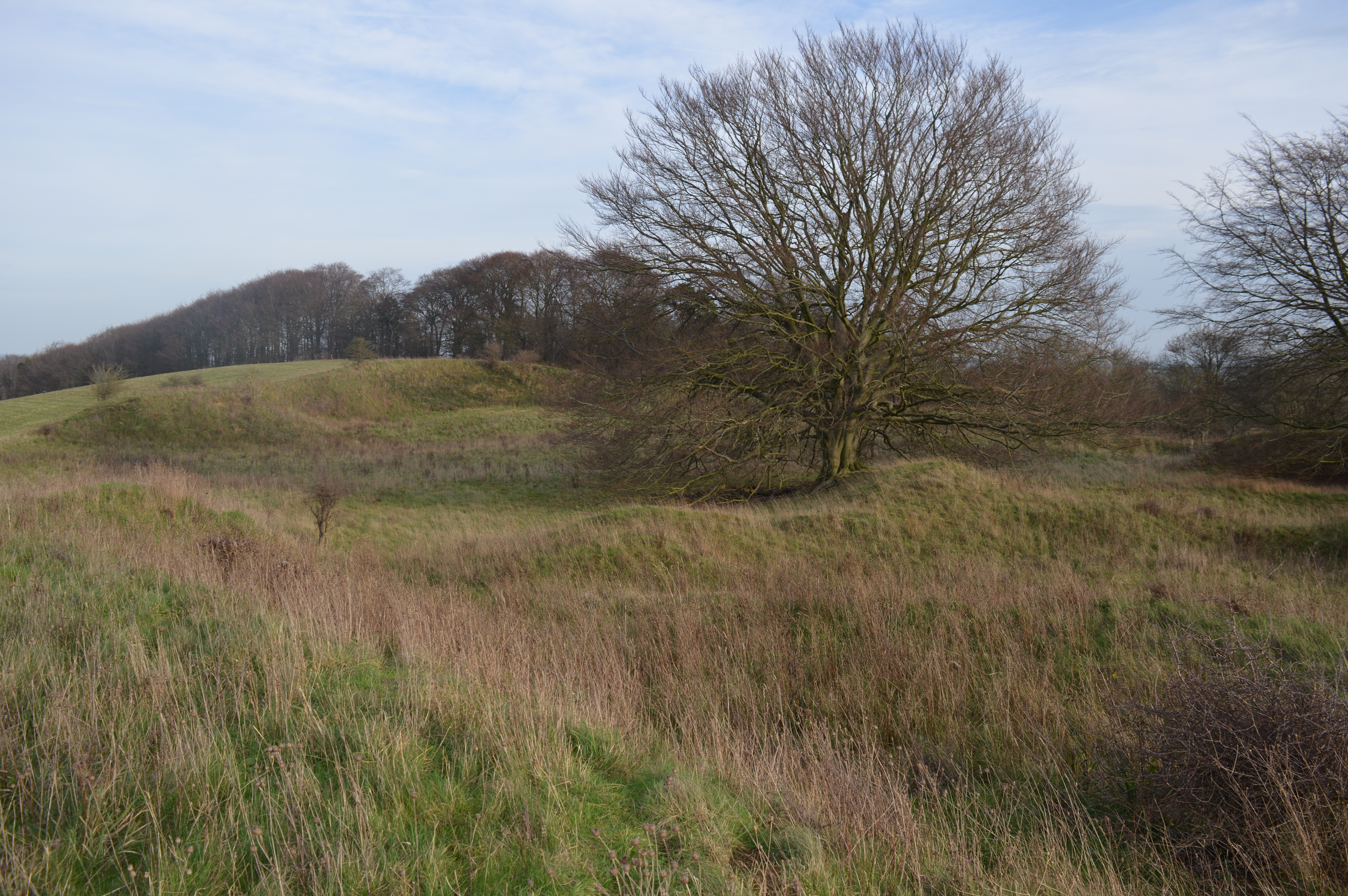

Barton Gravel Pit is a 1.1-hectare (2.7-acre) nature reserve east of Barton-le-Clay in Bedfordshire. It is managed by the Wildlife Trust for Bedfordshire, Cambridgeshire and Northamptonshire.

This former gravel pit has been partially filled in to become flower-rich chalk grassland. Plants include knotted hedge-parsley, common poppy and great pignut. Mature beech trees provide a habitat for the white helleborine orchid.

There is access from the second public bridleway on the right off Hexton Road, proceeding from Barton-le-Clay. When the path turns left, the site is 100 metres on the left. There are no signs or information board on the site.
