= Houghton Regis Marl Lakes =

Coordinates: 51.899°N 0.536°W

- Site of Special Scientific Interest
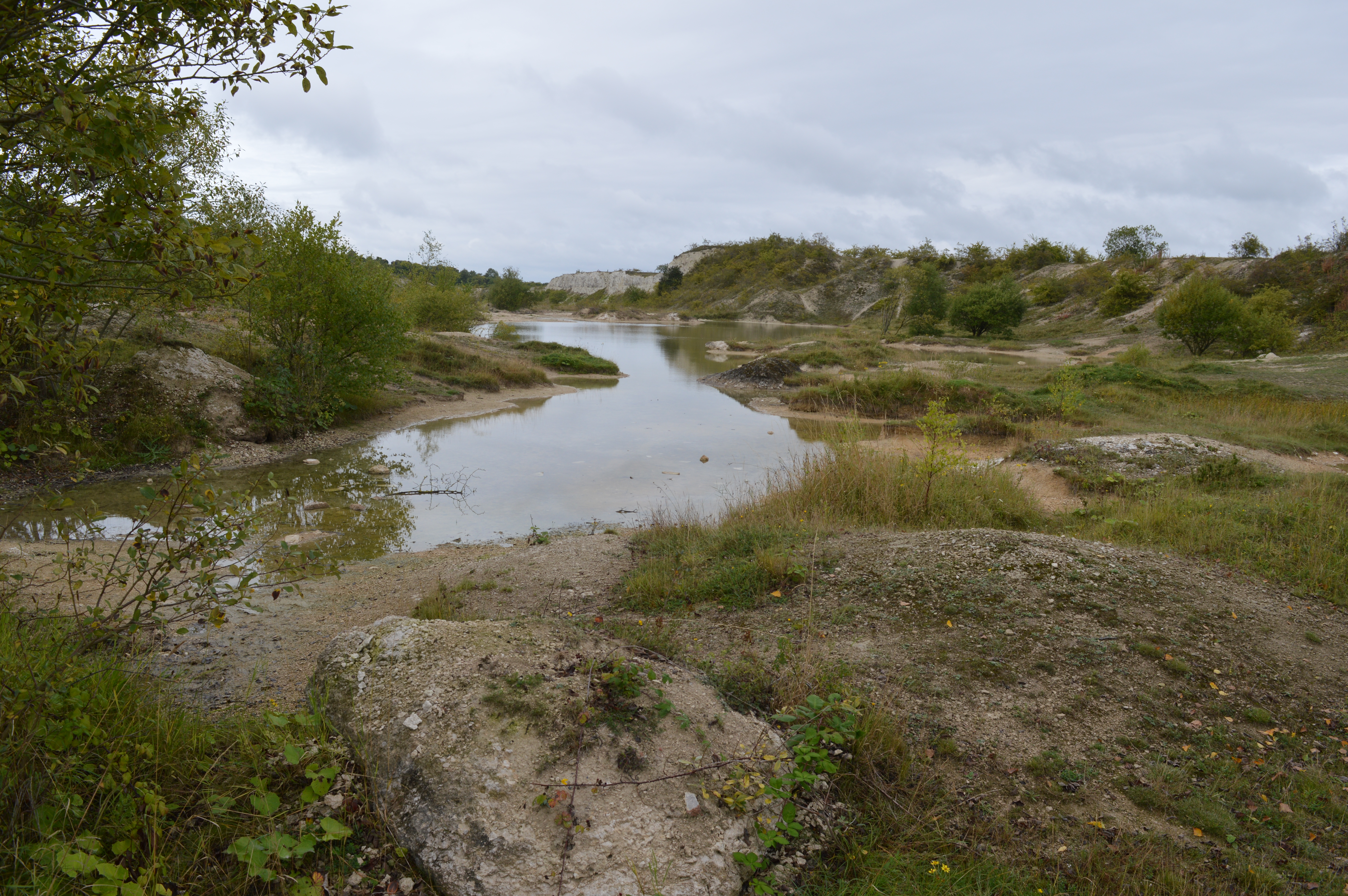
- Location of Houghton Regis Marl Lakes.
- Area of search: Bedfordshire
- Grid reference: TL008235
- Interest: Biological
- Area: 20.1 ha (50 acres)
- Notification date: 1988
- Location map: Magic Map

Houghton Regis Marl Lakes is a 20.1-hectare (50-acre) biological Site of Special Scientific Interest in Houghton Regis in Bedfordshire. It was notified under the Wildlife and Countryside Act 1981 in 1988.

The site is a large disused chalk quarry, and it is listed by Geo-East as a "Chalk Place to Visit" due to its exposure of Totternhoe stone. It is a rare example of standing water in chalk. It is important both ornithologically and for its range of dragonflies. There are two marl lakes, one deep and one shallow, which have aquatic plants and molluscs, with fens in a waterlogged area between the lakes.

The Wildlife Trust for Bedfordshire, Cambridgeshire and Northamptonshire managed the site between 2011 and 2015. A Trust noticeboard at the northern and southern entrances to the site names it as Houghton Regis Chalk Pit. The Wildlife Trust BCN produced newsletters during their management period and these are retrievable online. Volunteers helped with tasks at various times. Youth Ranger activities, took place and these included tasks such as scrub-clearing using conservation tools and controlled bonfires. The Chalk Pit regularly appeared in Wildlife BCN's North Chilterns Chalk volunteer programme
