= Marston Thrift =

Protected area in Bedfordshire, England

Coordinates: 52.065°N 0.583°W

- Site of Special Scientific Interest
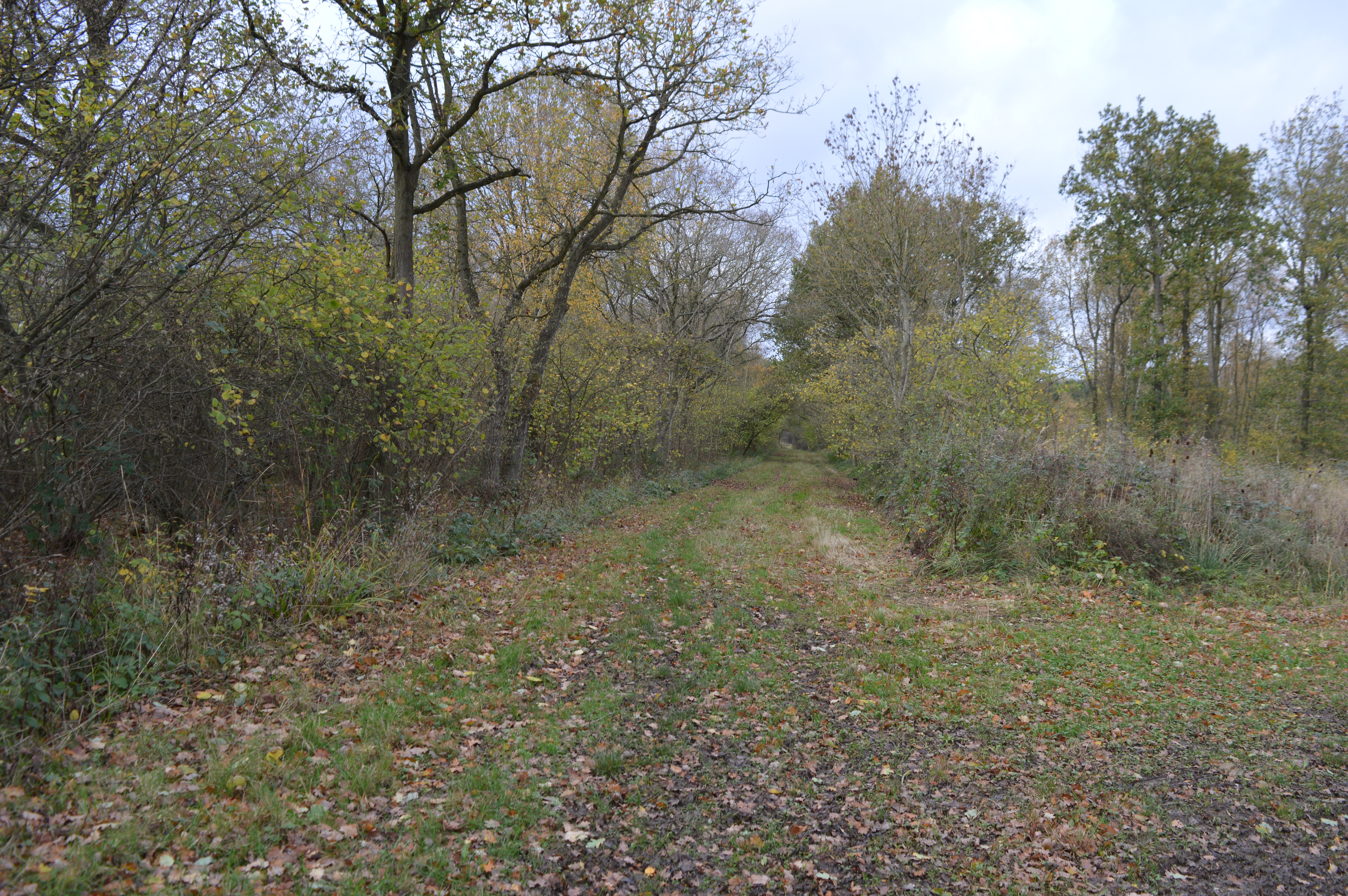
- Location of Marston Thrift.
- Area of search: Bedfordshire
- Grid reference: SP973417
- Interest: Biological
- Area: 37.4 ha (92 acres)
- Notification date: 1984
- Location map: Magic Map

Marston Thrift is a 37.4-hectare (92-acre) biological Site of Special Scientific Interest between Marston Moretaine and Cranfield in Bedfordshire. It was notified in 1984 under Section 28 of the Wildlife and Countryside Act 1981, and the local planning authority is Central Bedfordshire Council. It is also a Local Nature Reserve, which extends to a larger area of 55.8 hectares.

The site is ash and maple woodland on heavy clay, a habitat which has become scarce in lowland England. It also has areas of damp grassland, and a grassland valley. It is an important site for butterflies, including the rare black hairstreak.

There is access from a car park at Wood End, and by footpaths from Cranfield and Marston Moretaine.

== Land ownership ==
All land within Marston Thrift SSSI is owned by the local authority.
