= Yelden Meadows =

Protected area in Bedfordshire, England

Coordinates: 52.295014°N 0.521183°W

- Site of Special Scientific Interest
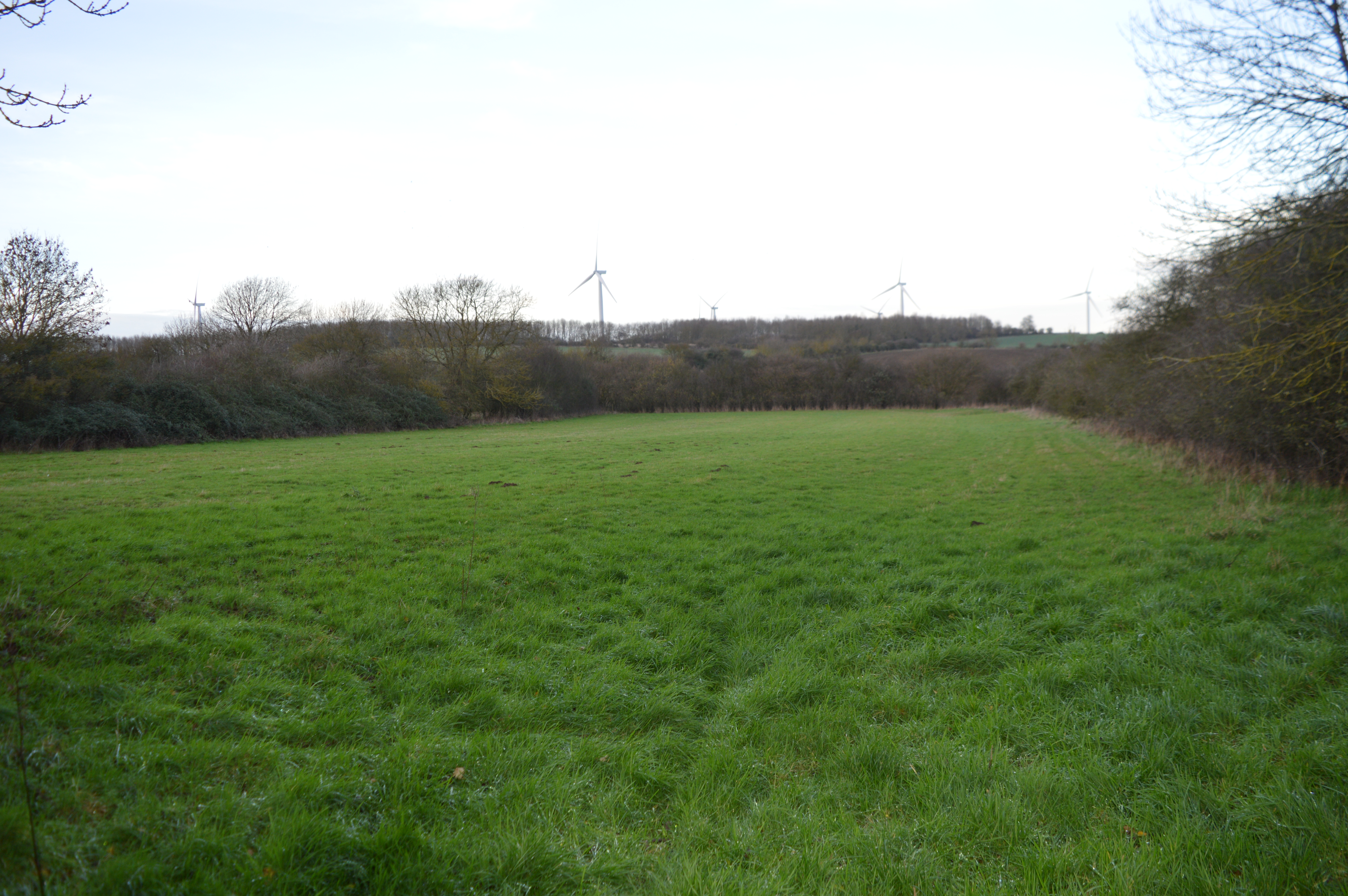
- Location of Yelden Meadows.
- Area of search: Bedfordshire
- Grid reference: TL010674
- Interest: Biological
- Area: 2.8 ha (6.9 acres)
- Notification date: 1988
- Location map: Magic Map

Yelden Meadows is a 2.8-hectare (6.9-acre) biological Site of Special Scientific Interest in Yelden (or Yeilden) in Bedfordshire. It was notified under Section 28 of the Wildlife and Countryside Act 1981, and the local planning authority is Bedford Borough Council.

The site is a rare example of neutral grassland on clay which has not been improved agriculturally. It is a flood meadow which has been maintained to provide hay with grazing during the winter, and it has a rich variety of plant species. The main grasses are meadow foxtail and rough meadow grass. Old hedgerows add to the diversity of habitats.

The site is private land and there is no public access.
