= Old man's beard =

Old man's beard may refer to the following:

- Chionanthus virginicus, a tree, which is used as a medicinal plant and ornamental plant.
- Clematis aristata, an Australian climbing plant.
- Clematis vitalba, a climbing plant.
- Tillandsia usneoides, "Spanish moss" - a bromeliad.
- Usnea, a genus of lichen.

== See also ==
- "The Old Man's Beard", an episode of Bagpuss
