= Wavendon Heath Ponds =

Coordinates: 51.995311°N 0.646146°W

- Site of Special Scientific Interest
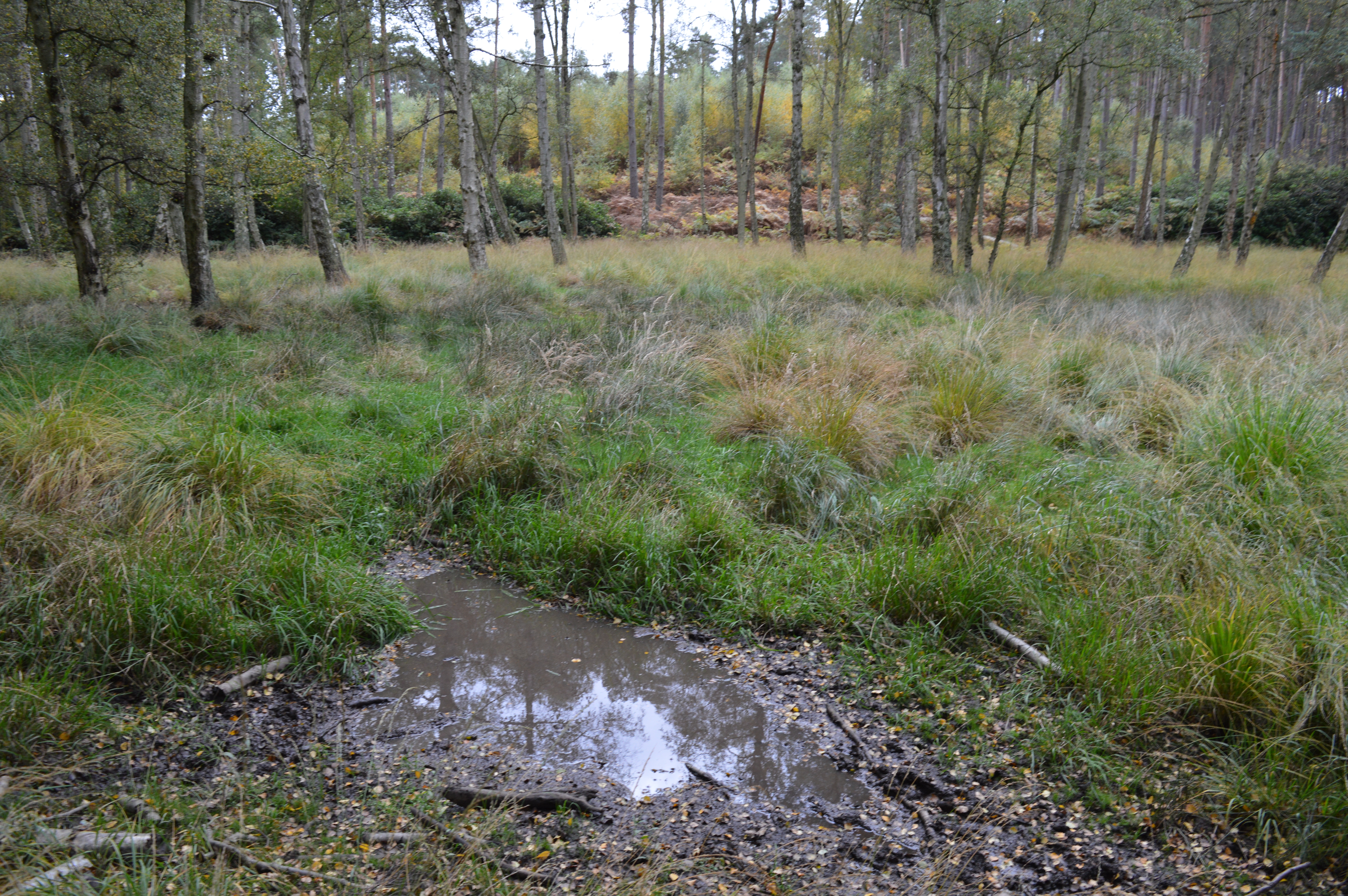
- Very little water is visible as the ponds have almost all been filled in by the growth of vegetation
- Location of Wavendon Heath Ponds.
- Area of search: Bedfordshire
- Grid reference: SP931339
- Interest: Biological
- Area: 4.7 ha (12 acres)
- Notification date: 1986
- Location map: Magic Map

Wavendon Heath Ponds is a 4.7-hectare (12-acre) biological Site of Special Scientific Interest in Aspley Heath in Bedfordshire. It was notified in 1986 under Section 28 of the Wildlife and Countryside Act 1981, and the local planning authority is Central Bedfordshire Council.

The site is acidic mire. It has three ponds which have unusual plant communities, two unimproved meadows, some damp birch woodland and a small stream.

The site is at the southern end of Aspley Woods (also known as New Wavendon Heath), and there is access from Church Road and by footpaths through the woods from Aspley Heath.
