= Bedfordshire Golf Club =

Golf club in Bedfordshire, England

- Location within Bedfordshire
- 52°8′1″N 0°33′8″W

Club information
- Location: Stagsden, Bedfordshire, England
- Established: 1891
- Total holes: 18
- Website: bedfordshiregolf.com
- Designed by: Cameron Sinclair
- Par: 70

Bedfordshire Golf Club is a golf club to the east of Stagsden, Bedfordshire, England. Established in 1891, it is the oldest golf club in Bedfordshire. The club moved to Stagsden in 2000 where a new 18-hole course designed by Cameron Sinclair was built.
