= Tebworth Marsh =

Protected area in Bedfordshire, England

Coordinates: 51.950375°N 0.571834°W

- Site of Special Scientific Interest
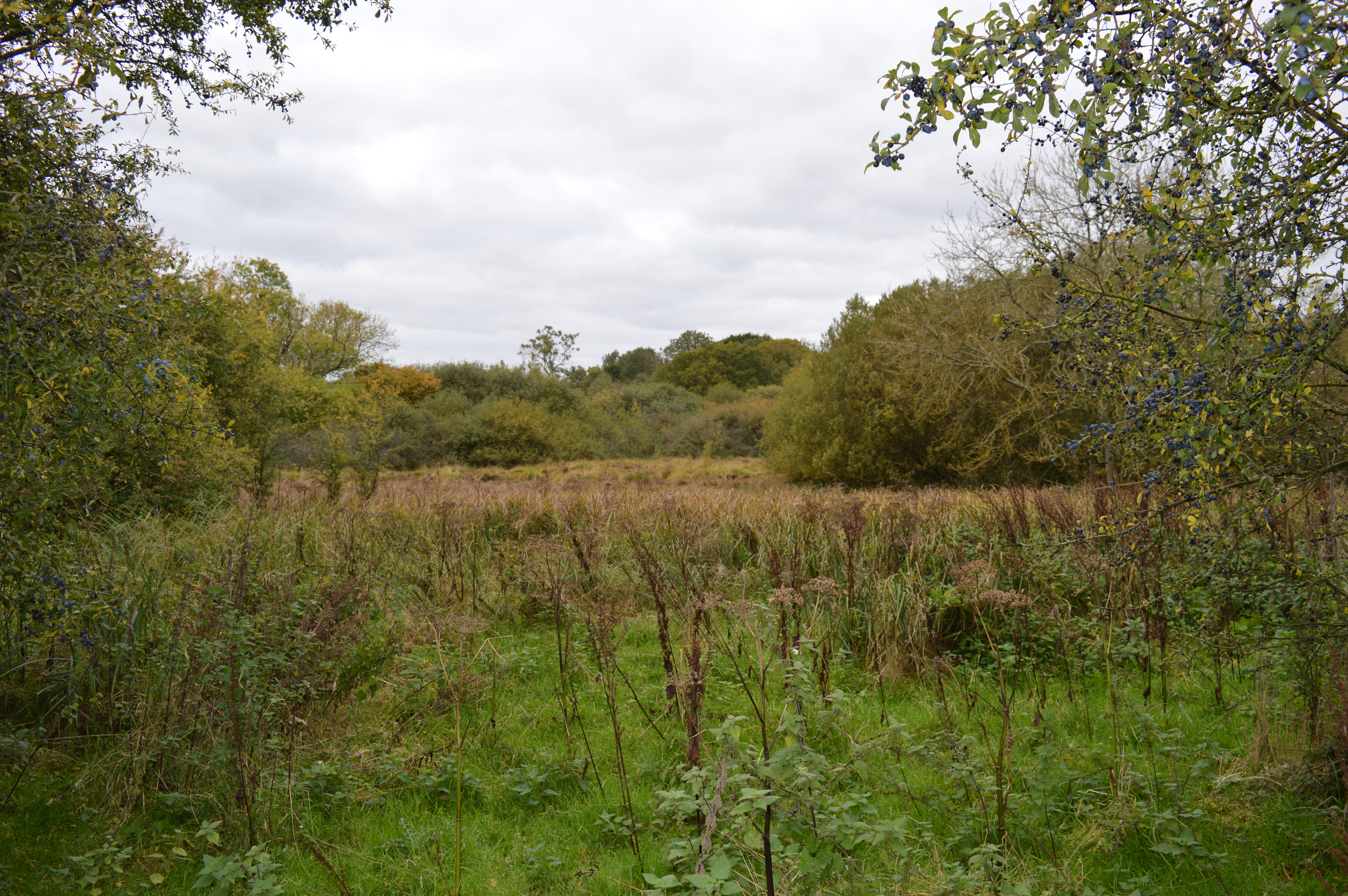
- Location of Tebworth Marsh.
- Area of search: Bedfordshire
- Grid reference: SP982290
- Interest: Biological
- Area: 5.6 ha (14 acres)
- Notification date: 1984
- Location map: Magic Map

Tebworth Marsh is a 5.6-hectare biological Site of Special Scientific Interest north of Tebworth in Bedfordshire. It was notified under Section 28 of the Wildlife and Countryside Act 1981, and the local planning authority is Central Bedfordshire Council.

This site is a base-rich marsh which has diverse plant life. It has springs along the edge of glacial gravel, and this produces wet marsh which is dominated by meadowsweet. Other habitats are neutral grassland, swamp carr woodland, mature ash woodland, a stream and hedgerows. Clipstone Brook forms its western boundary.

There is access to the site by a track from Tebworth.
