= Stagsden =

Village in Bedfordshire, England

Coordinates: 52.129719°N 0.565973°W

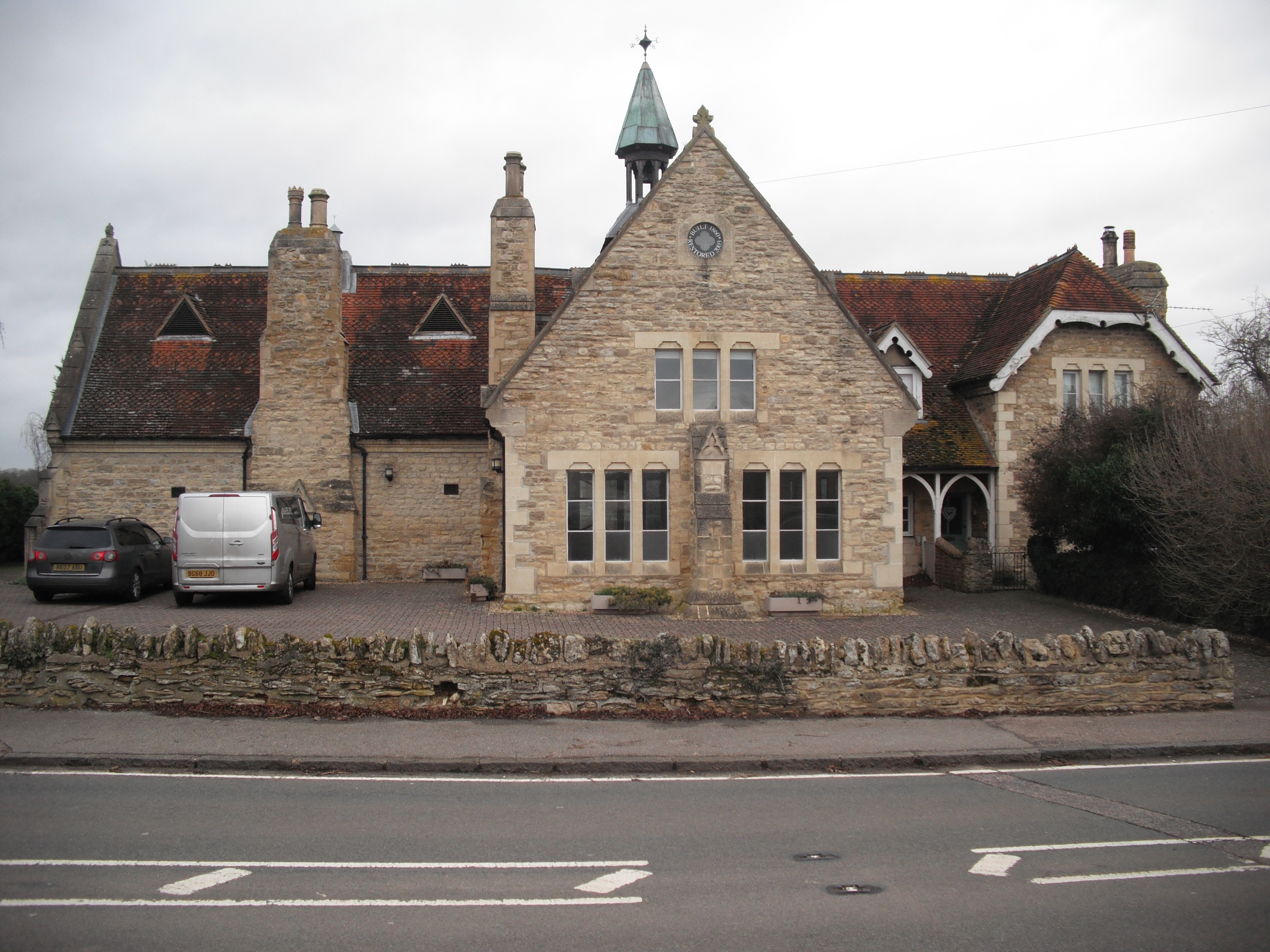
- Stagsden Village Hall

- Location within Bedfordshire
- Interactive map of Stagsden
- Population: 400
- OS grid reference: SP981489
- Unitary authority: Bedford
- Ceremonial county: Bedfordshire
- Region: East
- Country: England
- Sovereign state: United Kingdom
- Post town: Bedford
- Postcode district: MK43
- Dialling code: 01234
- Police: Bedfordshire
- Fire: Bedfordshire
- Ambulance: East of England
- UK Parliament: North Bedfordshire

Stagsden is a small and historic village and civil parish located in the Borough of Bedford, northwest Bedfordshire, England, near the Buckinghamshire border. It is situated around 4 miles (6.4 km) west of Bedford town centre on one of the main routes between it and Milton Keynes.

The village has at its centre St. Leonard's Church, where High Street, Bedford Road and Church Lane all meet. Toward the western end of the village, along High Street, is the Royal George pub (now closed) and the Village Hall (formerly the primary school). The village's history is well preserved, and several millennium projects centred on such preservation for future generations.

In 2000, Stagsden acquired two new additions. A Millennium bench was placed at the corner of Bedford Road and the High Street, and Bedfordshire Golf Club opened a new course on the hillside facing the village, on the other side of the A422.

There is a village sign next to the church.

For electoral purposes the village is part of Bromham ward and as October 2025 is represented on Bedford Borough Council by Robert Rigby and Dylan Simmons, both of the Conservative Party and elected in May 2023.

Until April 1992 the main road from Bedford to Milton Keynes passed through the village. It was bypassed by the A422 to cater to increasing volumes of traffic.

Half a mile east of Stagsden and inside the parish boundary is Hanger Wood, an ancient woodland and Site of Special Scientific Interest.

Stagsden is home to the British Tripod Brand, 3 Legged Thing. The brand stamps the name "Stagsden" onto each and every product that they manufacture as a tribute to the village. 3 Legged Thing is situated in two Chicken Sheds ( Shedquarters [Unit 9] & Return of the Shedi [Unit 10] ), on the site of Kinsbourne Farm, Bury End, previously a poultry farm that was home to over 30,000 chickens.
