= Stevington Marsh =

- Site of Special Scientific Interest
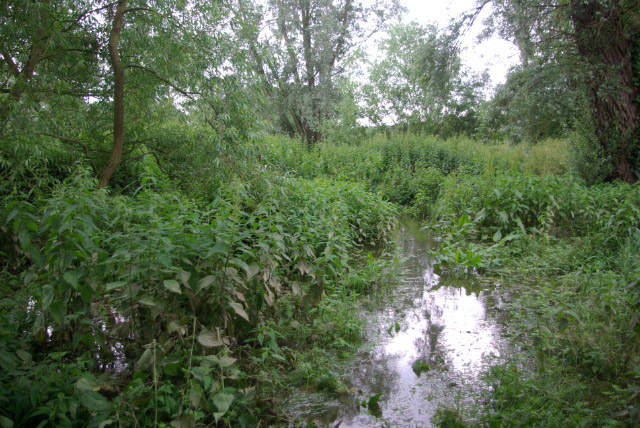

- Location within Southeast England Location within England
- Location of Stevington Marsh.
- Area of search: Bedfordshire
- Grid reference: SP986551
- Coordinates: 52.183159°N 0.564389°W
- Interest: Biological
- Area: 7.5 ha (19 acres)
- Notification date: 1987
- Location map: Magic Map

Stevington Marsh is a 7.5-hectare (19-acre) biological Site of Special Scientific Interest in Pavenham in Bedfordshire. It was notified in 1987 under Section 28 of the Wildlife and Countryside Act 1981, and the local planning authority is Bedford Borough Council.

The site is marshland along the banks of the River Great Ouse. The river, marshes and pastures form varied habitats. The marshes are floristically rich, with the largest one being dominated by great horsetail. The wetland communities and Jurassic limestone grassland are rare habitats in eastern England.

There is access by a footpath from Mill Lane.
