= Tilwick Meadow =

Protected area in Bedfordshire, England

Coordinates: 52.197661°N 0.432235°W

- Site of Special Scientific Interest
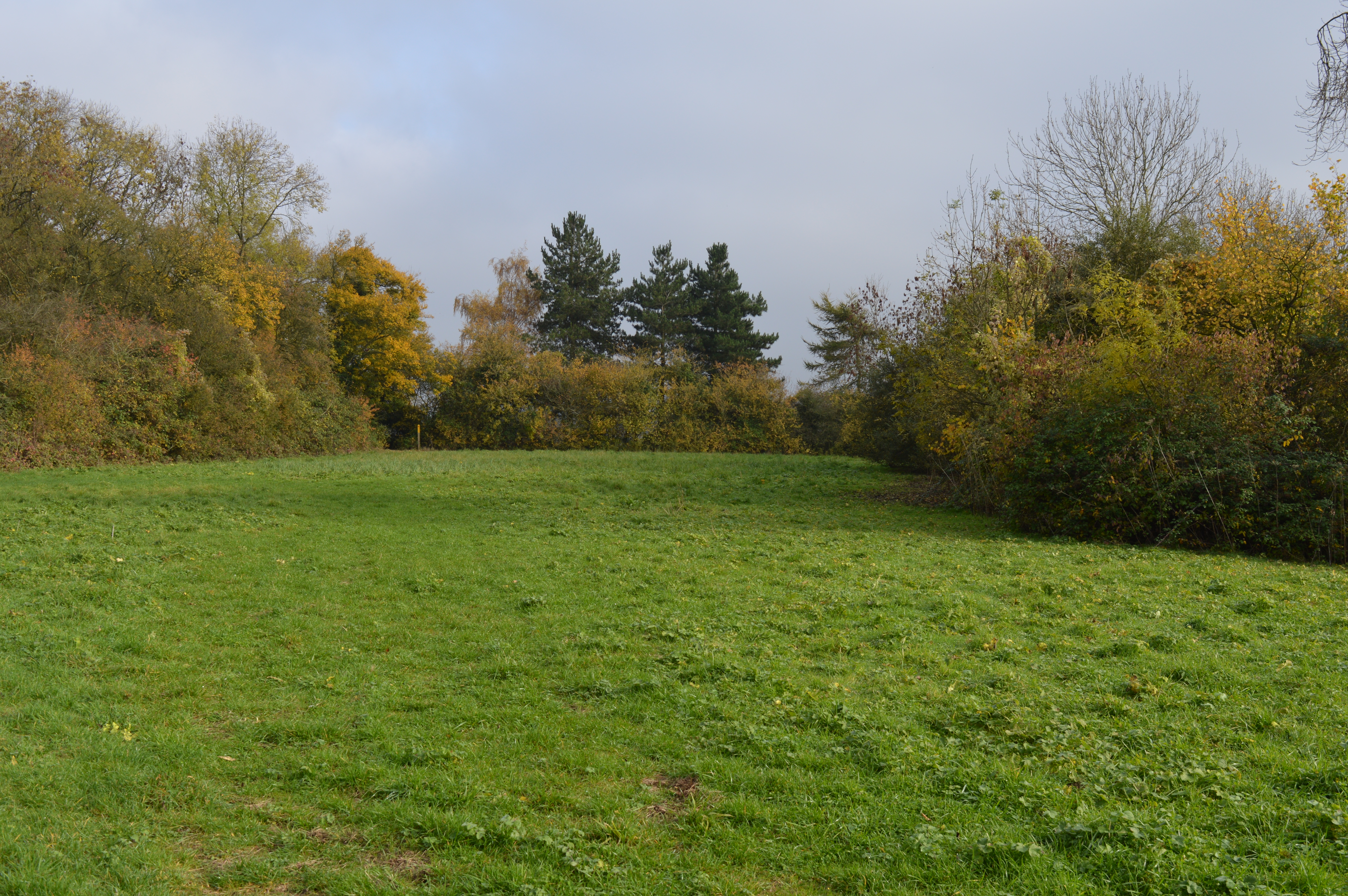
- Location of Tilwick Meadow.
- Area of search: Bedfordshire
- Grid reference: TL073567
- Interest: Biological
- Area: 2.6 ha (6.4 acres)
- Notification date: 1988
- Location map: Magic Map

Tilwick Meadow is a 2.6-hectare (6.4-acre) biological Site of Special Scientific Interest between Thurleigh and Wilden in Bedfordshire. It was notified in 1988 under Section 28 of the Wildlife and Countryside Act 1981, and the local planning authority is Bedford Borough Council.

The meadow is on the site of a medieval village abandoned during the Black Death. It is unimproved grassland on chalk boulder clay, and it has very rich flora on a habitat now rare nationally. Grass species include red fescue and sweet vernal-grass, and there some species associated with woodland indicate that part of the area was wooded in the past. There are also ponds and ditches.

There is access by a footpath from Wood End.
