= Biddenham Pit =

Gravel pit in Biddenham, Bedfordshire, England

Coordinates: 52.142°N 0.507°W

- Site of Special Scientific Interest
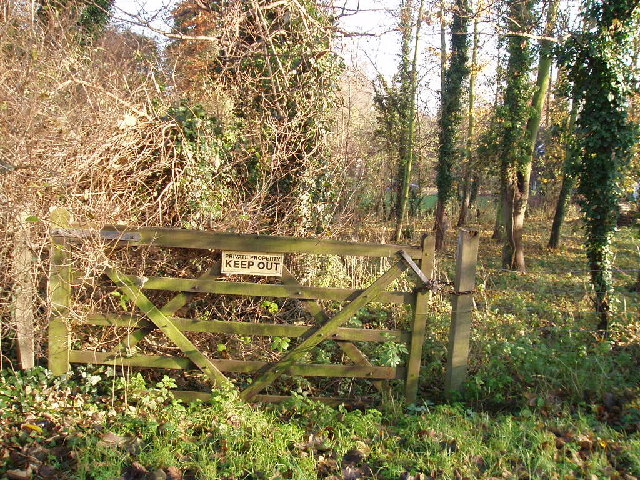
- Location of Biddenham Pit.
- Area of search: Bedfordshire
- Grid reference: TL022503
- Interest: Geological
- Area: 0.4 ha (0.99 acres)
- Notification date: 1988
- Location map: Magic Map

Biddenham Pit is a gravel pit and Site of Special Scientific Interest (SSSI), 0.41 hectares in size located in Biddenham, Bedfordshire. The pit was notified to Bedford Borough Council and Bedfordshire County Council under the Wildlife and Countryside Act (1981) in 1988, and is also a Geological Conservation Review site. The site is owned by Persimmon Homes and Kier Homes, with management advice given by Natural England.

The pit provides an intact and visually inspectable terrace gravel, both silty and clayey, which has been laid down by the River Great Ouse. Several features of scientific interest have been identified in the deposits - interglacial mollusca and mammalian remains have been found, possible microfossil material as well as evidence of a prolific Paleolithic industry in the lowest layers of the gravel. Its last official inspection by a Natural England staff member found the whole site and more specifically the gravel feature inside it to be in a 'Favourable' condition.

There is access by a footpath from Malcote Close.
