= Kings Wood and Glebe Meadows, Houghton Conquest =

Protected area in Bedfordshire, England

Coordinates: 52.052°N 0.477°W

- Site of Special Scientific Interest
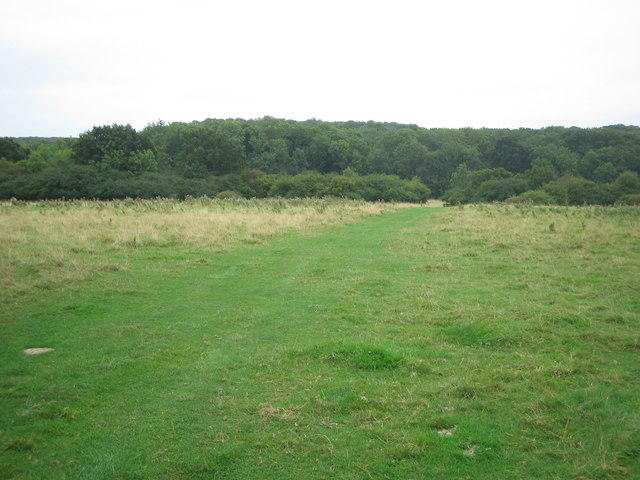
- Location of Kings Wood and Glebe Meadows, Houghton Conquest.
- Area of search: Bedfordshire
- Grid reference: TL045403
- Interest: Biological
- Area: 36.1 ha (89 acres)
- Notification date: 1984
- Location map: Magic Map

Kings Wood and Glebe Meadows is a 36.1-hectare (89-acre) Site of Special Scientific Interest in Houghton Conquest in Bedfordshire. A local teenage boy, Peter Sollars, discovered many rich communities of plants there, including a number of rare species, e.g. Butcher's Broom, Small Teasel and Green Hellebore in the wood, and combinations of Lady's Bedstraw, Spiny Restharrow, Great Burnet, Adders Tongue Fern and Cowslips in the meadows. The County Botanist at the time, John Dony, was notified of his findings, which were confirmed by a site visit with Peter . The site was notified in 1984 under the Wildlife and Countryside Act 1981, and the planning authority is Central Bedfordshire. It is also a Local Nature Reserve.

This site has ash and maple woodland on heavy clay, a habitat which has become rare in lowland England. It is biologically diverse, with a number of rare species. Several plants are indicative of ancient woodland, such as wood melick and wood anemone. Glebe Meadows has a rich variety of species due to its traditional management, and there are also some small ponds and mature hedgerows.

There is access by a footpath from Rectory Lane.
