= Sharpenhoe =

Village in Bedfordshire, England

Coordinates: 51.962°N 0.449°W

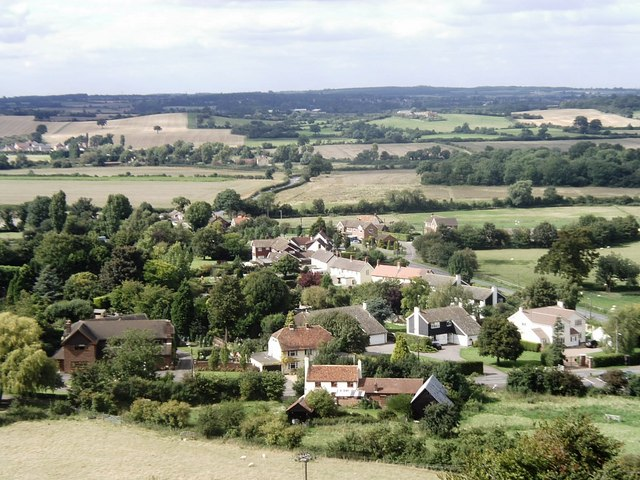
- Sharpenhoe from Sharpenhoe Clappers

- Location within Bedfordshire
- OS grid reference: TL065305
- Unitary authority: Central Bedfordshire
- Ceremonial county: Bedfordshire
- Region: East
- Country: England
- Sovereign state: United Kingdom
- Post town: Bedford
- Postcode district: MK45
- Dialling code: 01582
- Police: Bedfordshire
- Fire: Bedfordshire
- Ambulance: East of England
- UK Parliament: Mid Bedfordshire

Sharpenhoe is a small village in Bedfordshire, England, at the foot of the hills known as the Sharpenhoe Clappers, which are within the Chilterns AONB. Smithcombe, Sharpenhoe and Sundon Hills are a Site of Special Scientific Interest, and most of it is a National Trust property. It is in the civil parish of Streatley.

Woburn Abbey had some interests in Sharpenhoe.

== Transport ==
The village is about 2 miles (3.2 km) east of junction 12 of the M1, north of Luton, south of Bedford, east of Harlington and just to the west of the A6 road at Barton le Clay.
