= Smithcombe, Sharpenhoe and Sundon Hills =

Coordinates: 51.95776°N 0.444983°W

- Site of Special Scientific Interest
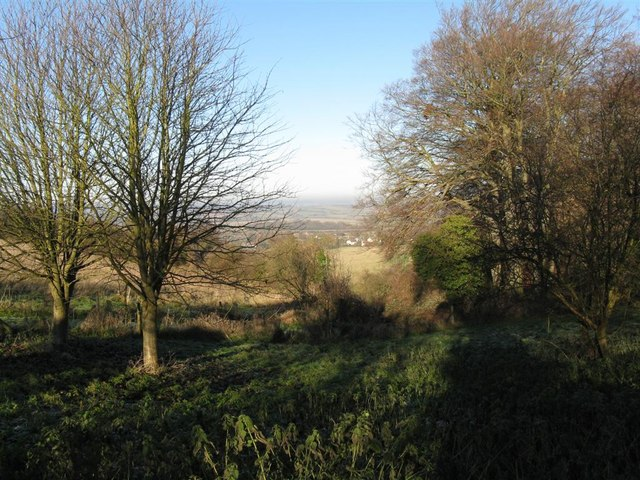
- View of Sharpenhoe
- Location of Smithcombe, Sharpenhoe and Sundon Hills.
- Area of search: Bedfordshire
- Grid reference: TL063298
- Interest: Biological
- Area: 86.1 ha (213 acres)
- Notification date: 1985
- Location map: Magic Map

Smithcombe, Sharpenhoe and Sundon Hills is an 86.1-hectare (213-acre) Site of Special Scientific Interest in Sharpenhoe in Bedfordshire. Most of it is a National Trust property comprising Sundon Hills, Moleskin and Markham Hills, Sharpenhoe Clappers and Smithcombe Hills. It is part of the Chilterns Area of Outstanding Natural Beauty, and Sharpenhoe Clappers is protected as a scheduled monument (for its prehistoric and medieval features).

Much of the site is unimproved chalk grassland with many plants which are now rare, and Festuca ovina is dominant over large areas. Orchids include Herminium monorchis and Aceras anthropophorum. An uncommon rose, Rosa stylosa, is found in scrub areas. There is also beech forest with a ground layer including primroses.

Clappers are rabbit warrens (from the French "clapier"), and meat, fur and leather from rabbits used to be an important part of the local economy. Sharpenhoe Clappers is an Iron Age hill fort, together with medieval rabbit warrens and associated agricultural earthworks.

There is access to the National Trust property from Sharpenhoe Road.
