= Galley and Warden Hills =

Hills in Warden Hill, Luton, England

Coordinates: 51.928°N 0.415°W

- Site of Special Scientific Interest
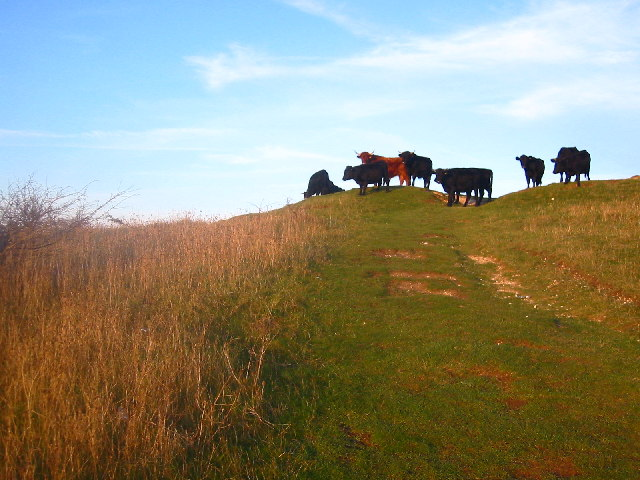
- Cows on Warden Hill
- Location of Galley and Warden Hills.
- Area of search: Bedfordshire
- Grid reference: TL092265
- Interest: Biological
- Area: 47.0 ha (116 acres)
- Notification date: 1986
- Location map: Magic Map

Galley and Warden Hills is a biological Site of Special Scientific Interest and Local Nature Reserve in the parish of Streatley, Bedfordshire, England. The 47-hectare site was notified in 1986 under Section 28 of the Wildlife and Countryside Act 1981 by South Bedfordshire District Council. The site is owned and managed by Central Bedfordshire Council.

The site is chalk grassland with areas of dense scrub, and it has many plants which are rare nationally and locally. It has a wide variety of wild flowers and more than twenty species of butterflies. Near the top of Galley Hill there are two Bronze Age barrows, one of which was used for public executions in the Middle Ages.

The Icknield Way Path passes through the hills on its 110-mile course from Ivinghoe Beacon in Buckinghamshire to Knettishall Heath in Suffolk.

There is access from Warden Hill Road. The site is partly bordered to the west by the Luton suburb of Warden Hill.
