= Biddenham =

Village in Bedfordshire, England

Coordinates: 52.14061°N 0.50511°W

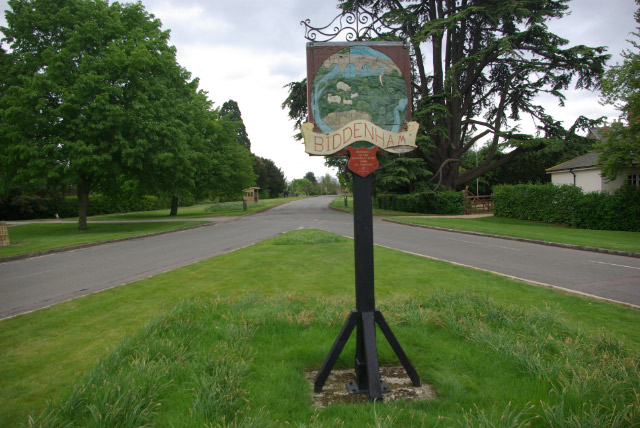
- Biddenham Village Sign

- Location within Bedfordshire
- Population: 2,620; 1,634 (2011 Census)
- OS grid reference: TL024502
- Unitary authority: Bedford
- Ceremonial county: Bedfordshire
- Region: East
- Country: England
- Sovereign state: United Kingdom
- Postcode district: MK40
- Dialling code: 01234
- Police: Bedfordshire
- Fire: Bedfordshire
- Ambulance: East of England
- UK Parliament: North Bedfordshire

Biddenham is a village and civil parish in the Borough of Bedford in Bedfordshire, England, located around 2 miles (3.2 km) west of Bedford town centre near the A428 road. It forms part of the wider Bedford urban area.

== History ==
The earliest archaeological evidence from Biddenham dates to the Palaeolithic, from the site of Deep Spinney. These were some of the first major Palaeolithic discoveries in England, although they were probably deposited there by glacial flow.

Biddenham is the location of the Manor Hospital, a BMI Healthcare private hospital. The village also contains St James Church, The Three Tuns pub, and a sports pavilion with a cricket pitch and football pitch (interchangeable depending on the season).

Sometime before 1920, a short 2 ft (610 mm) gauge railway was operated by S.W. Jarvis & Son at the Biddenham Gravel Pit. The line was removed in the 1930s.

Biddenham International School and Sports College is located on Biddenham Turn. It is a state secondary school for Biddenham and the western part of Bedford. The school was originally named John Howard Upper School, but was renamed after a merger with another school in 1988. St Joseph's and St Gregory's Catholic Primary School is also located on Biddenham Turn. The school was formed following the merger of St Joseph's Lower and St Gregory's Middle in September 2017. St. James' Primary School, located on Main Road, is the village's primary school.

== See also ==
- Biddenham Pit – a Site of Special Scientific Interest
