= Pavenham =

Village in Bedfordshire, England

Coordinates: 52.188°N 0.554°W

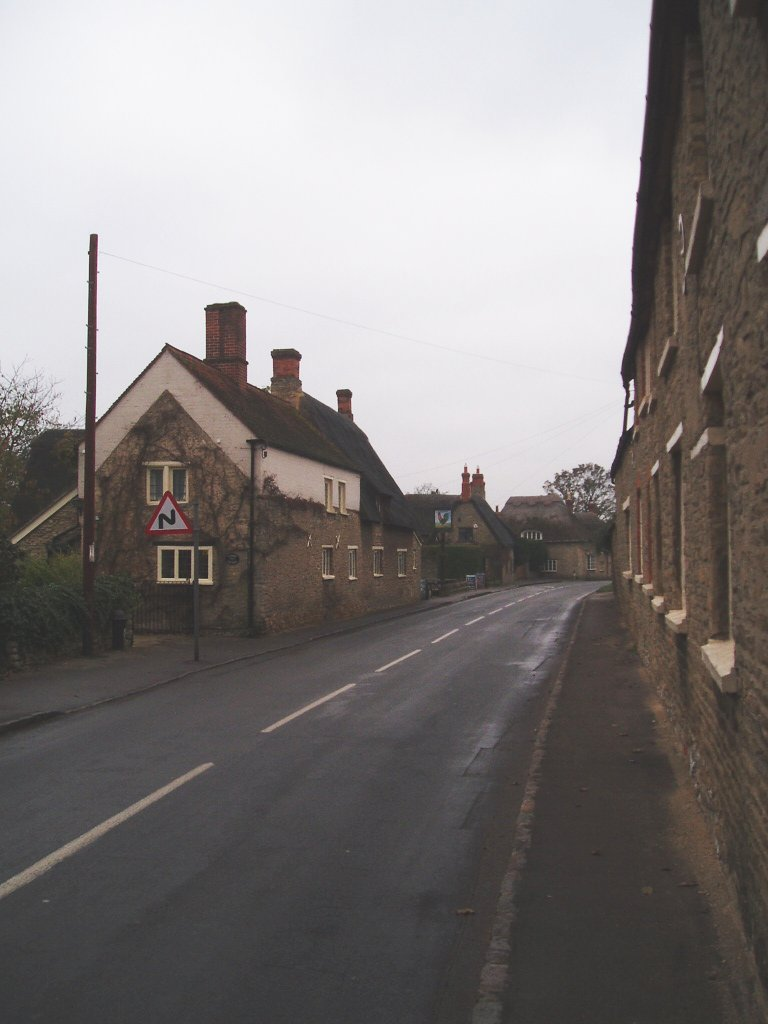
- Pavenham high street

- Location within Bedfordshire
- Population: 712 (2011 Census)
- OS grid reference: SP991235
- Unitary authority: Bedford
- Ceremonial county: Bedfordshire
- Region: East
- Country: England
- Sovereign state: United Kingdom
- Post town: BEDFORD
- Postcode district: MK43
- Dialling code: 01234
- Police: Bedfordshire
- Fire: Bedfordshire
- Ambulance: East of England
- UK Parliament: North Bedfordshire

Pavenham is a small village and civil parish on the River Great Ouse in the Borough of Bedford in Bedfordshire, England, about 6 miles (10 km) north-west of Bedford. Village amenities consist of St Peter's Church, a pub, Village hall, tennis Club, Cricket Club and golf club. The village is home to many clubs and societies including an active WI.

The village has two nature reserves, Stevington Marsh, a Site of Special Scientific Interest, and Pavenham Osier Beds, which is managed by the Wildlife Trust for Bedfordshire, Cambridgeshire and Northamptonshire.

== Timeline ==
1086: Domesday Book identifies Pavenham in the ancient hundred of Buckelowe

1205: Church first mentioned as a chapel or daughter church to Felmersham

13th Century: Church exists only as a nave and chancel

14th Century: The tower, spire and the chapel north of the chancel added to the Church

15th Century: North aisle and south transept (a chapel) added to the Church

1578: Churchwardens report Trinity College for letting the Church fall into disrepair

1665: The year that the Pavenham Old Yew Tree believed to have been planted, the year of the Great Plague

1770: Pavenham Enclosure Act

1798: Workhouse first mentioned

1813: Water Mill closed

1827: Sunday School Started

1853: Church of England School opened, provided by Squire Tucker

1857: Wesleyan Chapel built

1877: Vicarage built, designed by Bedford architect John Usher

1888: Cricket Club Founded

1920: War memorial unveiled

1935: Electricity came to the village

1938: The Cock Inn substantially rebuilt

1955: Roof to the nave of the Church replaced

1959: Village Hall re-opened after improvements made

1960: Pavenham Bury demolished

1961: The Old Yew Tree transplanted 15 feet from its original position as part of a road improvement scheme

1965: Pavenham Women's Institute plant oak in the playing fields to commemorate the Golden Jubilee of the Women's Institute

1967: Pavenham Sports Pavilion Opened - built by local builder Charles Cartlidge.

1972: Vicarage demolished

1980: New Village Hall opened

1983: Village school closed

== Sport ==
Pavenham is the origin village of Pavenham Football Club, established in 2010. The club was promoted to Bedfordshire County Football Premier Division after their 3rd successive promotion.

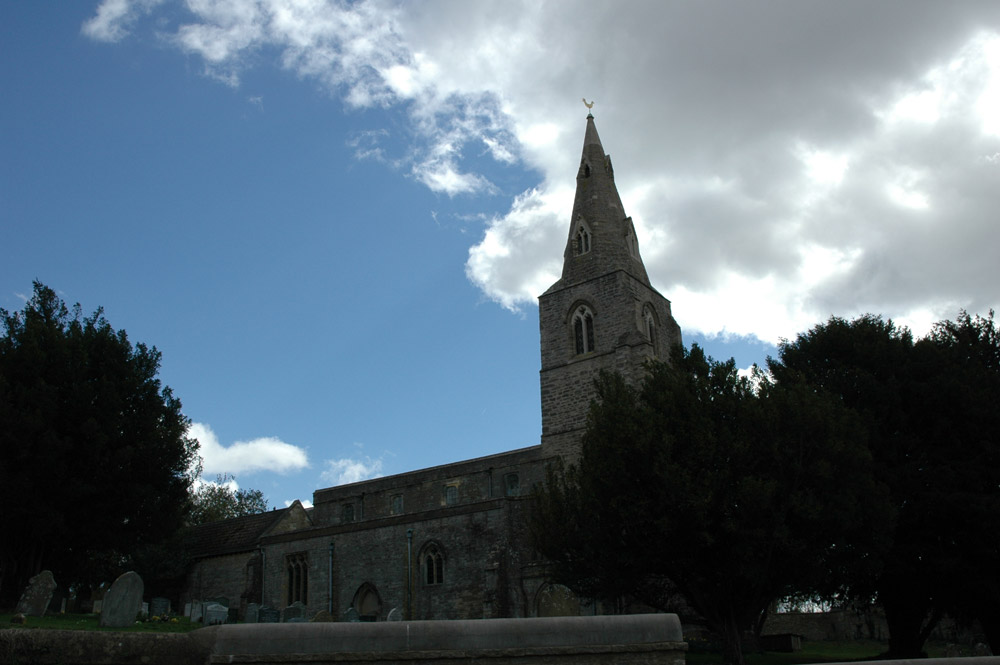
St Peter's Church

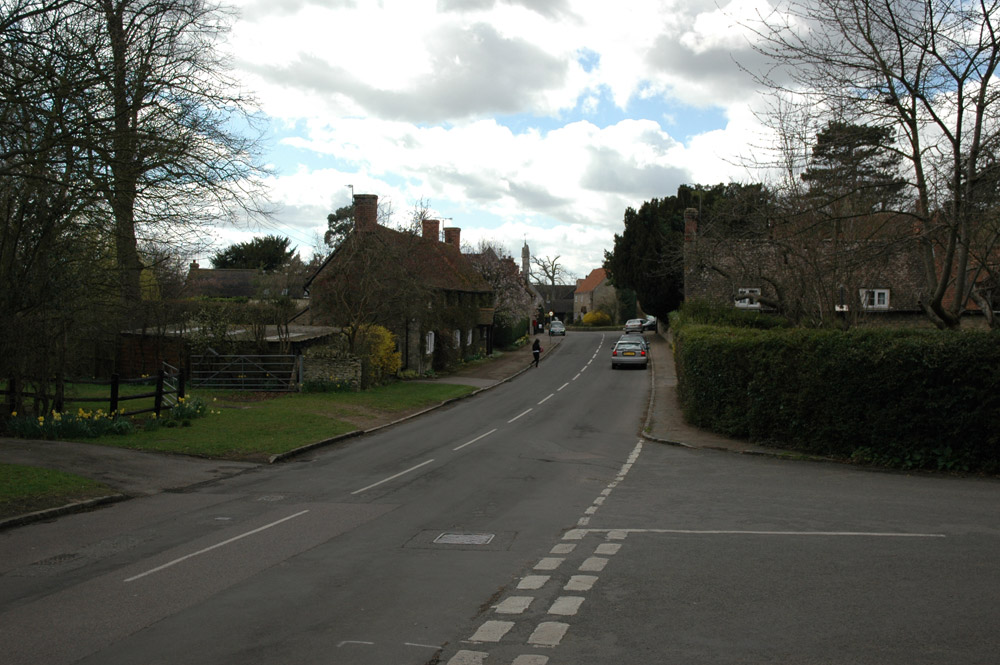
High Street, Pavenham

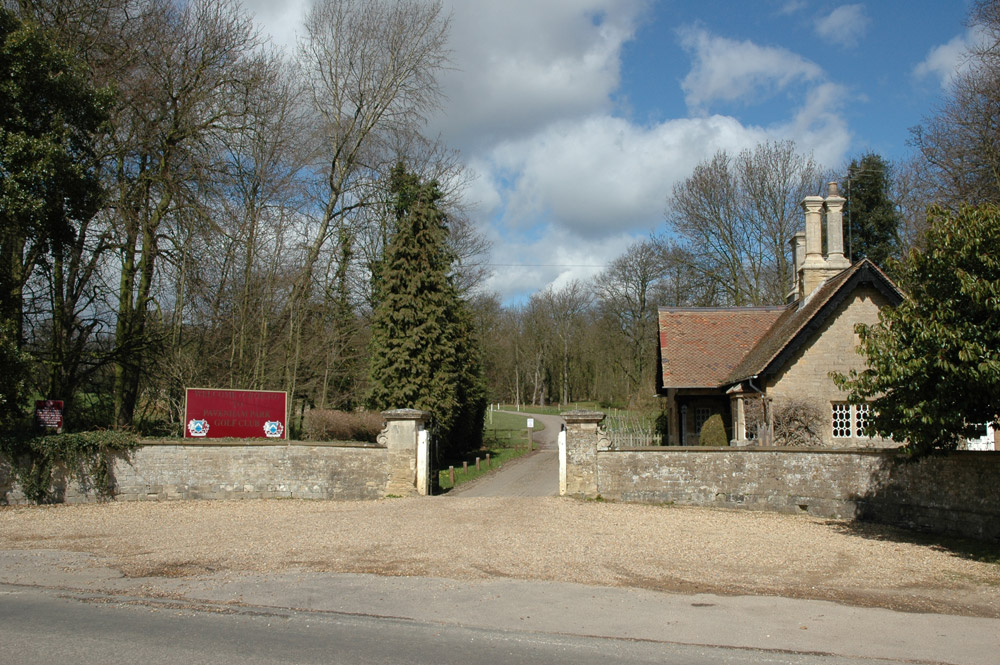
Pavenham Golf Course
