= Hundred of Barford =

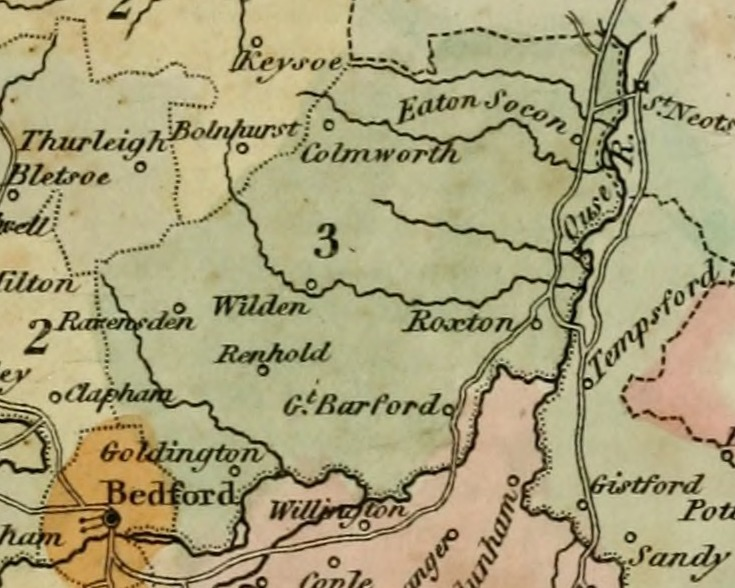
Map of Barford Hundred, Bedfordshire, taken from A topographical dictionary of the United Kingdom (1808)

Barford was a judicial and taxation subdivision (a "hundred") of Bedfordshire, that existed from the 10th to the 19th century.

The hundred was formed after King Edward the Elder subdued the Vikings of Bedford in 915 and constructed two burhs on each side of the River Great Ouse in Bedford. Willey, Barford, Stodden and the half-hundreds of Buckelow and Bedford were created to support the north Bedford burh. Barford consisted of 97 hides, which were situated in the following vills, which were all upstream of Bedford on the north side of the Ouse: Great Barford, Colmworth, Eaton Socon (including Sudbury and Wyboston), Goldington, Ravensden, Renhold (including Salph End), Roxton (including Chawston) and Wilden. The name of the hundred is derived from the town of Great Barford, which was part of the hundred.

Barford hundred was originally owned by the King of England, was granted by Charles I to Gilbert North in 1629 and was later held by the Earls of Bolingbroke. In the 13th century its rent was 2/3 to 2 2/3 pounds.
