= Wyboston, Chawston and Colesden =

- Civil parish
- Interactive map of Wyboston, Chawston and Colesden
- Coordinates: 52.1914°N 0.3268°W
- Country: England
- Primary council: Bedford
- County: Bedfordshire
- Region: East of England
- Status: Parish
- Main settlements: Wyboston; Chawston; Colesden; Begwary

Government
  - Type: Parish Council
  - UK Parliament: North Bedfordshire

Population (2011)
  - Total: 936
- Postal code: MK44
- Area code: MK
- Website: Parish Council

Wyboston, Chawston and Colesden is a civil parish located in the Borough of Bedford in Bedfordshire, in England.

The parish includes the village of Wyboston, and the smaller settlements of Chawston and Colesden. These villages used to form part of the Roxton parish, but became separate in May 2007.

The small hamlet of Begwary is also within the parish. The hamlet contains Begwary Brook, a marshland nature reserve.

== Geography ==
The £120,000 section of the A1 from the Black Cat roundabout A428 (now A421) to the start of the Eaton Socon bypass opened in 1959.
