= Great Barford =

Village in Bedfordshire, England

Coordinates: 52.158°N 0.353°W

- Village in the Borough of Bedford
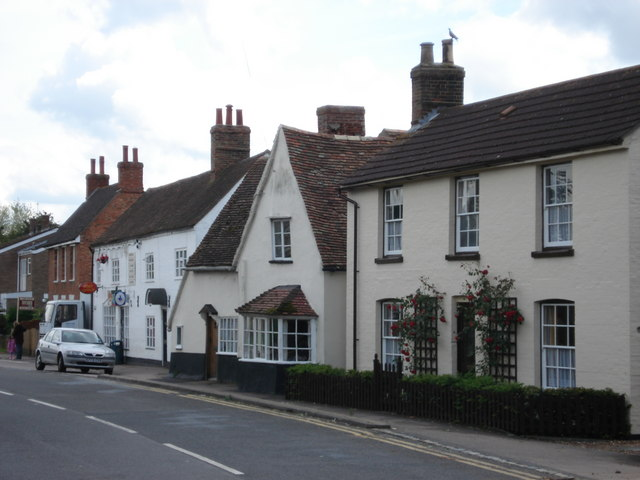
- Post Office and High Street

- Location within Bedfordshire
- Population: 2,254 (2021)
- OS grid reference: TL126545
- Unitary authority: Bedford
- Ceremonial county: Bedfordshire
- Region: East
- Country: England
- Sovereign state: United Kingdom
- Post town: BEDFORD
- Postcode district: MK44
- Dialling code: 01234
- Police: Bedfordshire
- Fire: Bedfordshire
- Ambulance: East of England
- UK Parliament: North Bedfordshire

Great Barford is a village and civil parish in the Borough of Bedford, Bedfordshire, England. It lies approximately 5 miles (8.0 km) north-east of Bedford town centre, on the River Great Ouse at grid reference TL129523. The village is twinned with Wöllstein, Germany.

The village contains several historic features, including All Saints Church, which has a 15th-century tower, and Great Barford Bridge, a multi-arched medieval bridge crossing the River Great Ouse.

Great Barford is bypassed by the A421, which provides a route between the M1 motorway near Milton Keynes and the A1 near St Neots. To the east of the village, the A421 connects with the A1 at the Black Cat roundabout. The junction is currently being redeveloped as part of a major road improvement scheme, with works expected to replace the roundabout with a grade-separated interchange (referred to as the Black Cat Junction).

Nearby villages include Renhold, Blunham, Roxton, Wilden and Ravensden.

== History ==
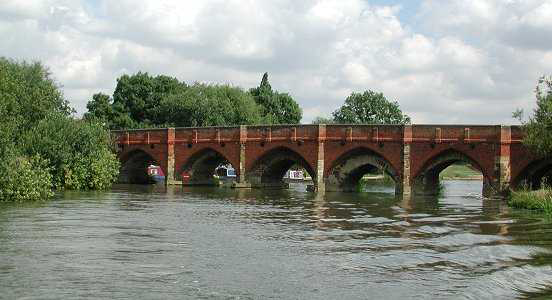
Great Barford Bridge

=== Prehistoric and Roman Activity ===
Archaeological investigations in the area have demonstrated that the site of Great Barford was occupied well before the medieval period. Evidence from excavations includes Iron Age enclosures and trackways, indicating organised settlement and agricultural use of the landscape. Burial activity has also been identified, including cremation cemeteries and inhumations.

=== Early Medieval Period ===
Great Barford is recorded in the Domesday Book of 1086 as a settlement with several mills, indicating both agricultural activity and the use of water power. Its position on the River Great Ouse made it a natural crossing point, and the settlement developed around this route.

The village gave its name to the Hundred of Barford, an administrative division used for taxation and local governance in Bedfordshire. Hundreds formed part of the structure of Anglo-Saxon and later medieval administration, and Barford Hundred remained in use for several centuries.

A very early reference to Barford may perhaps be found in a charter by which Offa of Mercia, in 792, confirmed various lands to the monastery of St Albans. The charter purports to have been granted in the place which is called 'Æt beranforda.' The text of the charter is certainly spurious, but the witnesses and dating clause may well have been taken from a genuine instrument. Even so, however, the identification with the present Barford cannot be considered certain.

=== Medieval Period ===
Following the Norman Conquest, a motte-and-bailey castle was constructed to the north of the village. The site, known as Great Barford Castle, consisted of an earthwork mound (motte) with an associated enclosed courtyard (bailey), forming part of the network of defensive and administrative structures established by the Normans. The castle was later associated with a manorial site referred to as Creaker's Manor. Little structural evidence survives, and the site is now represented by earthworks.

During the later medieval period, the original ford across the River Great Ouse was replaced by a bridge. By the early 15th century, a substantial stone bridge had been constructed, allowing more reliable crossing of the river and its floodplain. This development formalised the route through the village and supported continued movement of people and goods.

=== Early Modern Period ===
By the 17th century, Great Barford had developed into a dispersed rural settlement. Surviving buildings from this period indicate continued habitation and agricultural activity, with timber-framed and later brick-built houses forming part of the village's building stock.

In 1820, an Enclosure Act, the Great Barford Enclosure Act of 1820, reorganised the open-field system in the parish, dividing common land into individually owned plots. This change altered patterns of land ownership and agricultural practice, replacing communal farming arrangements with enclosed fields.

Religious provision expanded during the 19th century, including the construction of a Methodist chapel in 1824. A purpose-built village school was established in 1848, reflecting the wider developments in education during this period.

=== Modern Development ===
In 1923, a memorial hall, Great Barford Village Hall, was constructed in the village to commemorate those who had died in the First World War. The building is used as a community facility, hosting meetings, events, and social activities.

Great Barford was twinned with Wöllstein in Germany in 1978, establishing a formal link between the two communities. Twinning arrangements typically involve cultural exchange visits and ongoing connections between residents.

The village experienced changes to its transport infrastructure in the late 20th and early 21st centuries. The construction of the Great Barford Bypass, completed in 2006, diverted through-traffic away from the centre of the village, reducing congestion and altering traffic patterns.

== Education ==
Great Barford is served by Great Barford Primary Academy, which provides primary education within the village.

The area operates within the two-tier education system used by Bedford Borough, following the discontinuation of the former three-tier system.

For secondary education, pupils typically attend schools in nearby towns. The village lies within the catchment areas of Sandy Secondary School in Sandy and Mark Rutherford School in Bedford, with Mark Rutherford School serving as the primary catchment school following the transition to the two-tier system.

== Culture and Events ==
Great Barford maintains an active programme of community and cultural activities centred around local institutions, particularly the parish church, village hall, and open spaces.

The parish church, All Saints Church, Great Barford, plays a significant role in village life, hosting regular services, musical activities, and community gatherings. The church supports a choir and bell-ringing group, and also organises events such as coffee mornings and markets, which are held monthly and attract residents across the village.

Community-led initiatives form a central part of the village's cultural life. Groups such as local support organisations host regular social events, including communal lunches for older residents, while village-wide activities are often coordinated through volunteer networks and local venues.

Great Barford also hosts periodic outdoor and family-oriented events. One such event is Great Barfest, a community festival featuring live music, food stalls, and entertainment. The event has included activities such as funfair attractions, children's entertainment, and local vendors, reflecting its role as a village celebration.

Historically, community infrastructure has supported cultural and social activity within the village. A memorial hall was established in 1923 as a venue for communal use, serving as an institute and reading room following the First World War.

The village's location along the River Great Ouse also contributes to its recreational culture, supporting activities such as walking, angling, and boating. The surrounding countryside and historic features, including the medieval bridge, further enhance its role as a setting for leisure and informal community events.

== Governance ==
Great Barford is a civil parish within Bedford Borough, a unitary authority area in Bedfordshire. Parish-level governance is provided by Great Barford Parish Council, which represents local residents and manages community matters. The parish council consists of 11 elected councillors who serve the parish.

For local elections, the village forms part of Great Barford Ward within Bedford Borough. At a national level, Great Barford lies within the North East Bedfordshire parliamentary constituency.

The village has also adopted neighbourhood planning. A referendum on the Great Barford Neighbourhood Plan was held on 16 December 2021, allowing the plan to be used in determining local planning applications.

== Economy ==
Population Growth in Great Barford since 1801
Year	Pop.	±%
1801	431	—
1811	577	+33.9%
1821	635	+10.1%
1831	731	+15.1%
1841	814	+11.4%
1851	865	+6.3%
1861	907	+4.9%
1871	847	−6.6%
1881	788	−7.0%
1891	746	−5.3%
1901	681	−8.7%
1911	726	+6.6%
1921	760	+4.7%
1931	775	+2.0%
1951	760	−1.9%
1961	788	+3.7%
1971	1,495	+89.7%
1981	1,741	+16.5%
1991	1,718	−1.3%
2001	1,859	+8.2%
2011	2,003	+7.7%
2021	2,254	+12.5%

Historically, Great Barford has been a predominantly agricultural parish. The Victoria County History of Bedfordshire Volume 3 records that the parish covered approximately 2,843 acres [CONVERT] and was largely devoted to arable farming and permanent grassland, with only a small area of woodland. Crops included wheat, barley and oats, and market gardening developed as an additional agricultural activity. The same sources records small-scale industrial activity, including a gravel pit, and notes the presence of both a former watermill and the remains of a windmill within the parish.

The landscape of Great Barford was significantly altered by the parliamentary enclosure in 1820, which reorganised the open fields into enclosed farmland.

In the early 21st century the local economy and transport infrastructure were influenced by the construction of the A421 Great Barford Bypass. The scheme was legally established by statutory instrument in 2003 and created a new route between Bedford and the A1.

Archaeological investigations undertaken during construction revealed evidence of settlement and land use from prehistoric through to post-medieval periods along the route.

A more recent overview is provided in the Great Barford Neighbourhood Plan (2021), which describes a mixed local economy including agriculture, small businesses, light industrial activity, and home-based working, alongside local services such as shops and hospitality venues.

== Sport and Recreation ==
Great Barford provides a range of recreational facilities centre on village open spaces and community infrastructure. The principal recreation ground, Great Barford Playing Fields, at Green End Road, adjacent to Great Barford Village Hall, is used for football and cricket, as well as children's play equipment and outdoor gym facilities. These grounds are supported by the Great Barford Playing Fields Association, a registered charity established to provide and maintain a recreational ground for the benefit of local inhabitants, with plans for developing multi sports courts for tennis, five-a-side football, netball and basketball.

Additional recreational spaces in the village such as Great Barford Village Green (adjacent to Great Barford Bridge on the River Great Ouse) and playgrounds at Jubilee Park (adjacent to Chapel Field and The Brambles), Hare Meadow, Woodpecker Close, alongside other informal green spaces used by residents.

Organised sport in the village also includes local clubs like the Great Barford Bowls & Petanque Club, which is based near the centre of the village and accessed via Woodpecker Close. The Great Barford Bowls & Petanque Club provides facilities for both lawn bowls and petanque, including a bowling green and floodlit petanque piste, and is active throughout the summer season, typically between May and September. In addition to competitive and friendly matches, the club operates as a community amateur sports club, offering social membership and hosting a range of activities in its clubhouse, including fitness sessions, meetings and community events.

The surrounding countryside and proximity to the River Great Ouse also support outdoor activities such as walking, fishing, and cycling, with public rights of way and the cycle route's 12 and 51 passing through the parish.
