= Upper Shelton =

Hamlet in Bedfordshire, England

Coordinates: 52.08056°N 0.55361°W

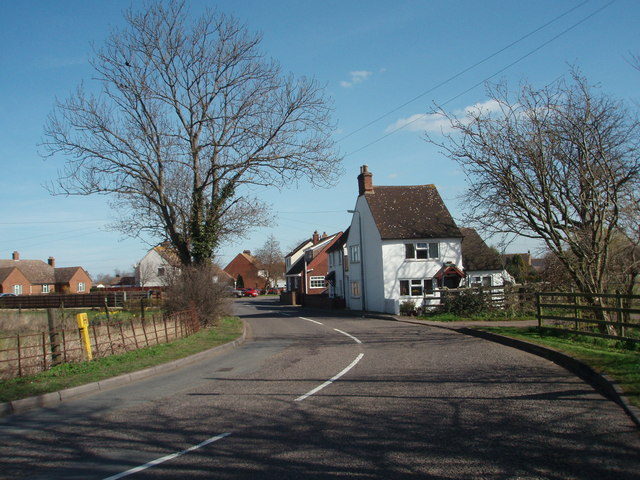

- Location within Bedfordshire
- OS grid reference: SP992434
- Civil parish: Marston Moreteyne
- Unitary authority: Central Bedfordshire
- Ceremonial county: Bedfordshire
- Region: East
- Country: England
- Sovereign state: United Kingdom
- Post town: Bedford
- Postcode district: MK43
- Dialling code: 01234
- Police: Bedfordshire
- Fire: Bedfordshire
- Ambulance: East of England
- UK Parliament: Mid Bedfordshire

Upper Shelton is a village in the civil parish of Marston Moreteyne, in the Central Bedfordshire district of Bedfordshire, England.

Upper Shelton contains a public house called "The Exhibition" (with a trojan horse in its back garden). There is also a lower school called "Shelton Lower School", and a butchers shop, village farm, and several bed and breakfast establishments.

The settlement is close to Cranfield, Stewartby and Marston Moreteyne. Upper Shelton (along with Lower Shelton) forms part of the Marston Moreteyne civil parish. The nearest large town to Upper Shelton is Bedford.
