= Begwary Brook =

Tributary of the River Great Ouse

Begwary Brok
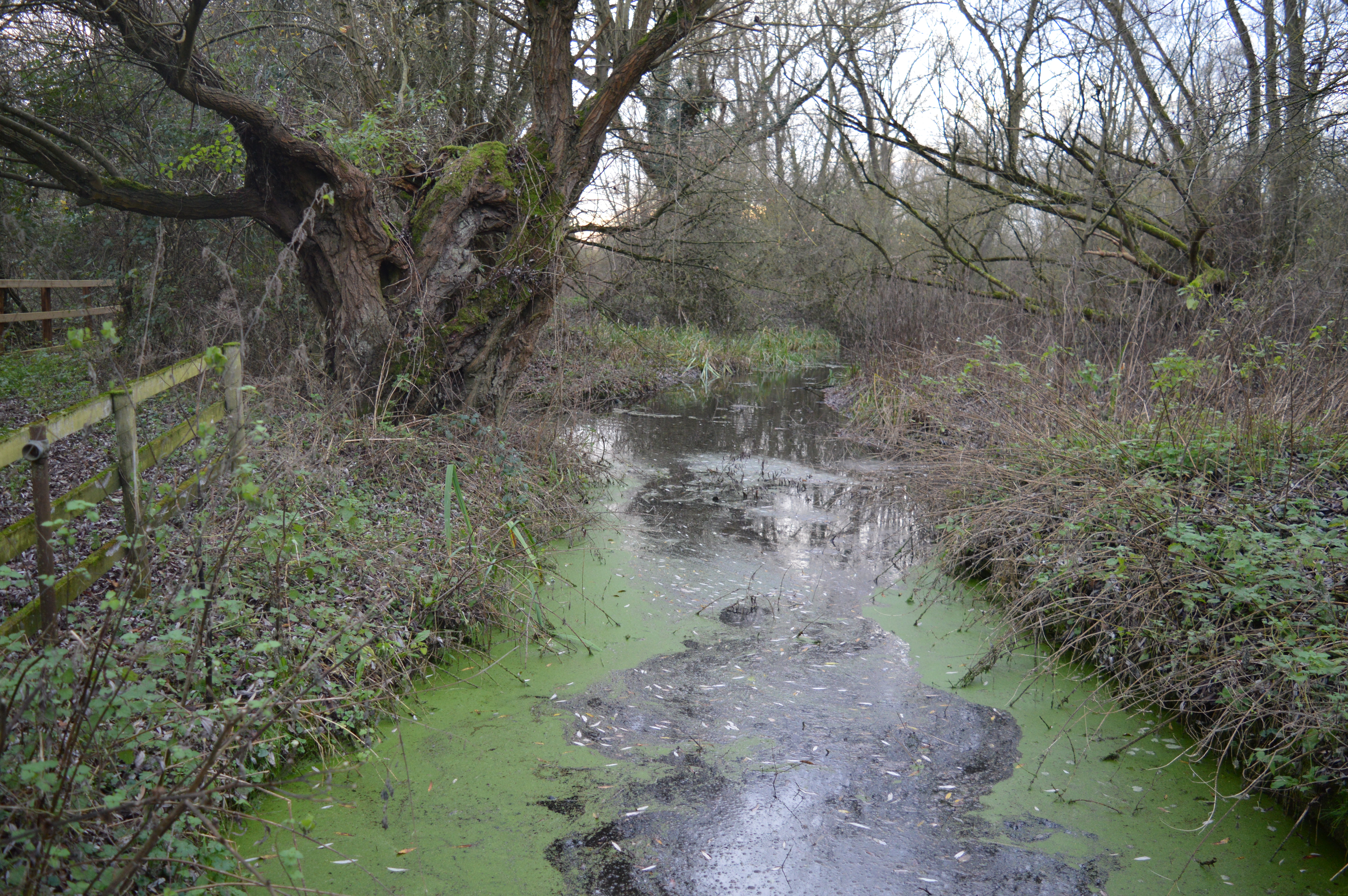

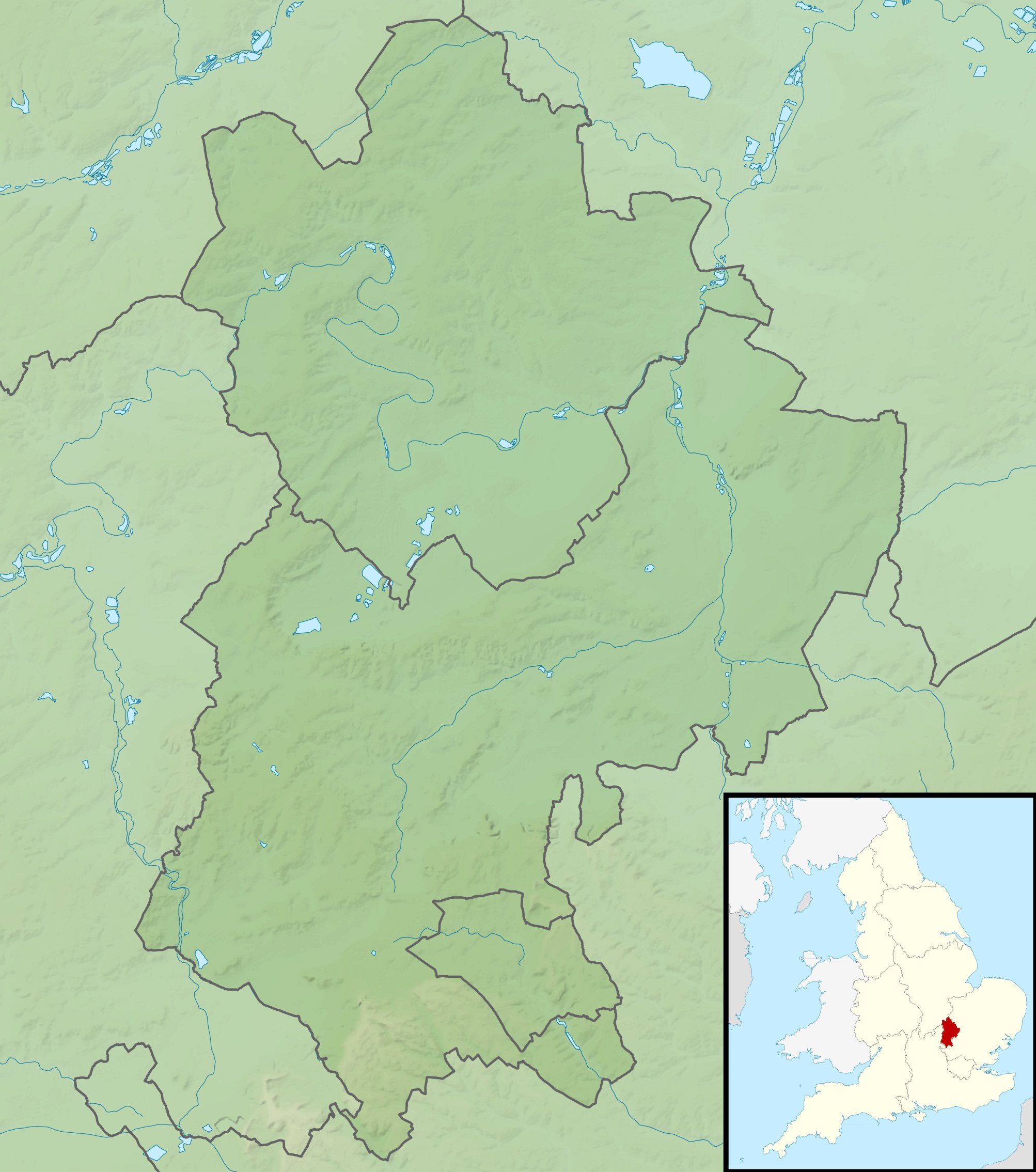
- Location within Bedfordshire Location within the United Kingdom

Location
- Country: England
- County: Bedfordshire

Physical characteristics
- Source
  - location: North of Duck's Cross
- Mouth: River Great Ouse
  - location: Wyboston
  - coordinates: 52.1938°N 0.2904°W
- Length: 4 miles (6.4 km)

Begwary Brook in Bedfordshire is a four mile long tributary of the River Great Ouse. Its source is half a mile north of Duck's Cross, and it then flows east to join the Great Ouse in Wyboston. The Environment Agency classes its water quality as good.

Begwary Brook is also the name of a nature reserve at the junction of the brook with the river, which is managed by the Wildlife Trust for Bedfordshire, Cambridgeshire and Northamptonshire. Gravel extraction has created a small lake and several smaller pools and marshland. The pools are surrounded by willow trees, and plants include common fleabane and marsh woundwort. Dragonflies and damselflies are common over the marsh in the summer.

There is access to the site by a footpath from the Wyboston Lakes complex.
