= Colesden =

Hamlet in Bedfordshire, England

Coordinates: 52.19109°N 0.35705°W

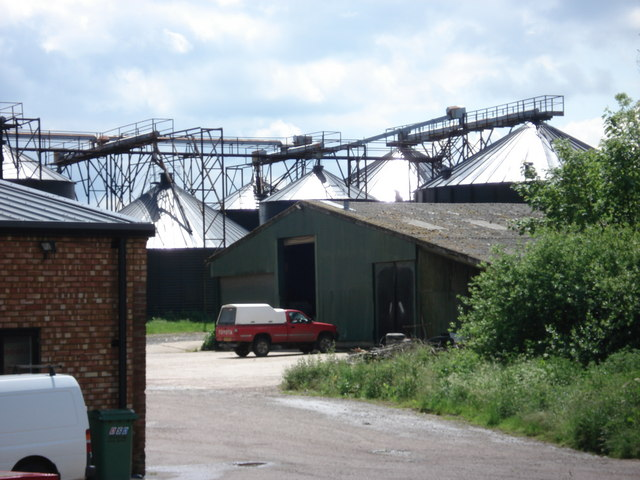
- Bell Farm

- Location within Bedfordshire
- OS grid reference: TL124560
- Civil parish: Wyboston, Chawston and Colesden
- Unitary authority: Bedford
- Ceremonial county: Bedfordshire
- Region: East
- Country: England
- Sovereign state: United Kingdom
- Post town: BEDFORD
- Postcode district: MK44
- Dialling code: 01480 and 01234
- Police: Bedfordshire
- Fire: Bedfordshire
- Ambulance: East of England
- UK Parliament: North Bedfordshire

Colesden is a small hamlet located in the English county of Bedfordshire. At the 2011 Census, the population of the hamlet was included in the civil parish of Wyboston, Chawston and Colesden.

== History ==
Colesden as a settlement was first recorded in 1195. The name Colesden is Anglo-Saxon in origin, and translates as Col's Valley. The Colesden estate was originally entailed to Bushmead Priory. Colesden Manor was first recorded in 1410, and was attached to nearby Roxton. There was no road from Colesden through to Wilden until the Inclosures Act 1837 (10 & 11 Vict. c. 25).

Today Colesden is almost entirely residential, with no shops or services apart from a community notice board and post box. In earlier years however, Colesden had pubs, a cricket field and church room.

== Colesden today ==
Colesden forms part of the Wyboston, Chawston and Colesden civil parish, and consists of 24 homes, located between the villages of Chawston and Wilden. The main industries in and around Colesden are still farming and agriculture, though a small number of business and industrial units have been constructed since 2000. Shops and most local services are located in the nearby villages of Wyboston and Roxton.
