= Goldington =

Area of Bedford, England

Coordinates: 52.14695°N 0.42756°W

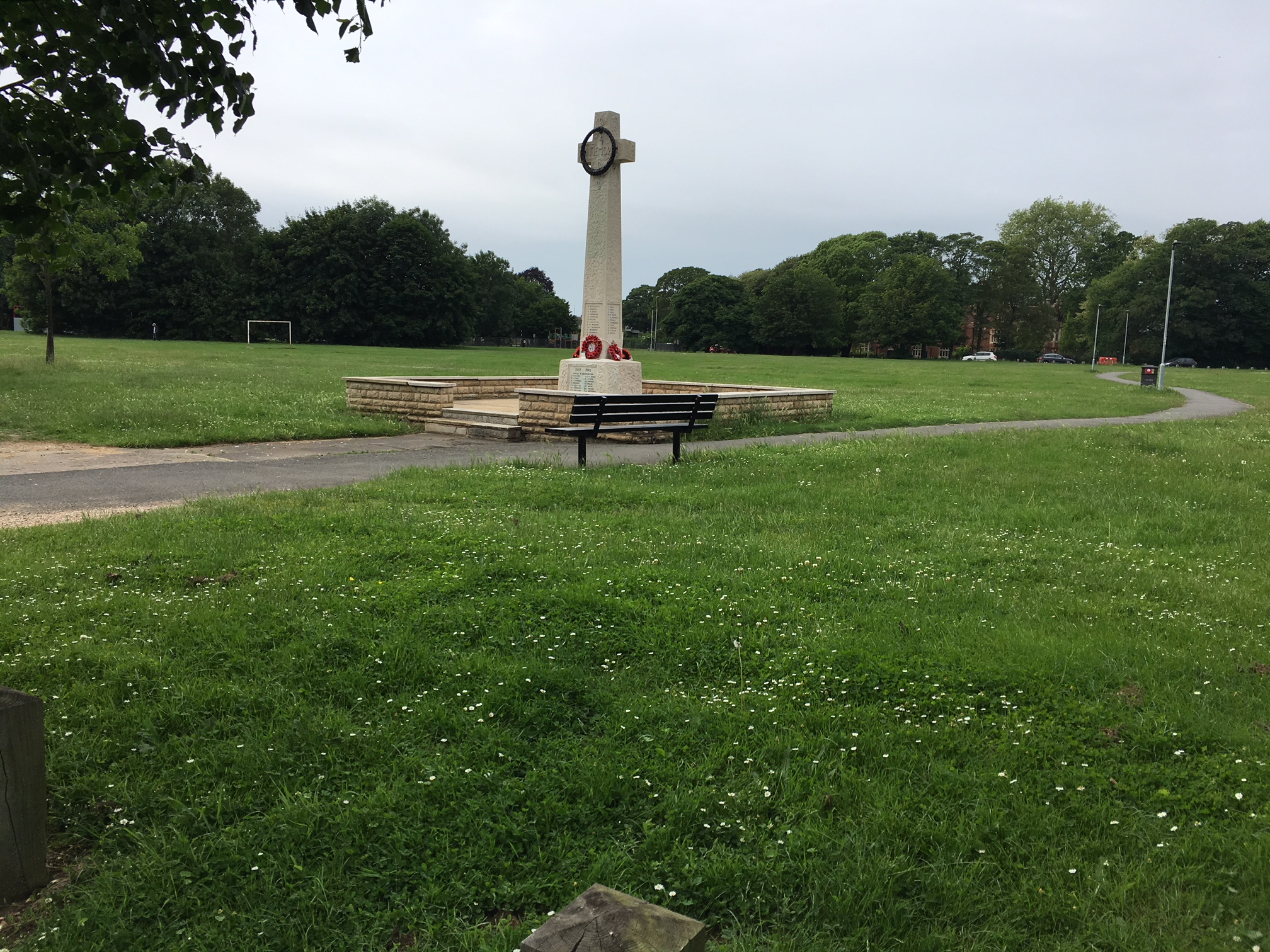
- Goldington Green war memorial, 2018

- Location within Bedfordshire
- Population: 8,603; 8,662 (2011 Census.Ward)
- OS grid reference: TL076510
- Unitary authority: Bedford
- Ceremonial county: Bedfordshire
- Region: East
- Country: England
- Sovereign state: United Kingdom
- Post town: Bedford
- Postcode district: MK41
- Dialling code: 01234
- Police: Bedfordshire
- Fire: Bedfordshire
- Ambulance: East of England
- UK Parliament: Bedford

Goldington is a suburban area of Bedford in Bedfordshire, England. It is also the name of a ward for elections to Bedford Borough Council,

The boundaries of Goldington are approximately The Spires and Aspire estates to the north, Norse Road to the east, Goldington Road to the south, with Church Lane and Bow Hill to the west. Part of the area is known as Elms Farm.

== History ==
Before becoming part of the town of Bedford, Goldington was a separate village which grew up along the road between Bedford and Cambridge, more recently known as the A4280. St Mary's Church in Goldington has parish registers going back to 1559.

In August 1645 Major Walter Baskerville, a Royalist cavalry Officer, was killed in a skirmish in Goldington. Goldington Hall (a small mansion) was built in the 1650s. The Hall was rebuilt in 1874.

Goldington parish, including Putnoe and parts of Ravensden and Brickhill, was part of the Hundred of Barford. An Act of Enclosure for Goldington came in 1852, later than other Bedfordshire parishes beside the River Great Ouse. The Act only affected 27 per cent of the parish as Newnham and Putnoe were enclosed in mediæval times. In 1931, at the last census before the parish was abolished on 1 April 1934, Goldington had a population of 1,440. The southern part of the parish was merged with Bedford and the northern rural parts became part of Ravensden and Renhold. Elms Farm comprising 301 acres (122 ha) north of Goldington village was purchased by Bedford Borough Council in 1950 and built on in the 1960s and 70s. The Poppyfields estate was developed in the 1990s.

Goldington Power Station was commissioned in June 1955 and decommissioned in October 1983. It had four cooling towers, and two chimneys at 91m tall. It was demolished in 1986-87 and by 1996 the area had been replaced by a housing estate.

In the 21st century The Spires and Aspire housing estates have been constructed on the northern boundary of Goldington. These newer estates are in the civil parish of Renhold.

After many years as a pub, the old Goldington Hall became semi-derelict and was the scene of a small fire in 2008. It is now a private residence.

Coplan Estates were appointed to re-develop the Church Lane shopping area in 2006, and an old pub called The Century was demolished in 2008. However the recession of the late 2000s delayed further progress. Phase one of the regeneration saw the Aldi supermarket being constructed at the site and this opened in summer 2010. An Iceland supermarket and medical centre were opened in 2015, with the Church Lane Community Centre refurbished in 2016.

The Queens Tavern pub on Queens Drive was closed in 2017 and replaced with a Co-op Food store.

Goldington Castle, a motte-and-bailey castle, was built sometime after 1066, but is not actually in Goldington despite its name. The castle is located in the neighbouring area of Newnham.

== Governance ==
The majority of Goldington is within the eponymous electoral ward, which encompasses much of the historic village and parish of Goldington merged with Bedford in 1934, though some parts of the old village are within the neighbouring Riverfield ward. Community services are under the direct control of Bedford Borough Council to which Goldington elects two councillors. Goldington also includes the Spires and Aspire housing estates, part of Renhold parish, which elect one councillor to Renhold Parish Council.

== Economy ==
Goldington Square on Church Lane includes an Aldi supermarket, a branch of Iceland, a Co-op store and post office, a hairdressers, a fish & chip shop, a bookmakers, a branch of Subway, a medical centre and a community centre. A second shopping hub on Queens Drive has a small convenience store, a post office, a chemist, a hairdresser, a butcher's shop, a laundrette, a Co-op convenience store, a fish & chip shop, petrol station and GP Surgery. There is also a small shopping parade on The Fairway with a convenience store, The Sportsman pub and a butchers shop. A greengrocer and fish and chip shop have closed and now stand empty.

A few shops and pubs are along the old village High Street (i.e. Goldington Road) including a small Londis supermarket. There is a small independent supermarket on Elliot Crescent.

To the eastern side of Goldington is the Elms & Viking Industrial estate. This large business park (between Goldington Road and Norse Road) houses many firms, including Enterprise Holdings, E.ON UK, GE Healthcare and the East of England Ambulance Service.

== Education ==
Since the alteration of ward boundaries in 2011, and the relocation of Putnoe Primary School, there are no schools within the ward. The ward is served by Putnoe Primary School, The Hills Academy, Goldington Green Academy and Renhold VC Primary School for primary school age pupils. Goldington Academy and Mark Rutherford School serve the area for secondary school age pupils.

== Religious sites ==
St Mary's Church (Church of England) is a grade II* listed building on Church Lane. Goldington Islamic Centre is a mosque on Goldington Road.

== Community facilities ==
Church Lane Community Centre is located on Goldington Square, Church Lane. Goldington Green is the area's largest open space, and is situated on Church Lane and Goldington Road. Goldington Bury cricket ground is situated next to Goldington Green. Goldington Bury is the home ground of Bedford Cricket Club.
