= Goldington Bury =

Cricket ground in Bedford, in England

Coordinates: 52°08′42″N 0°25′41″W

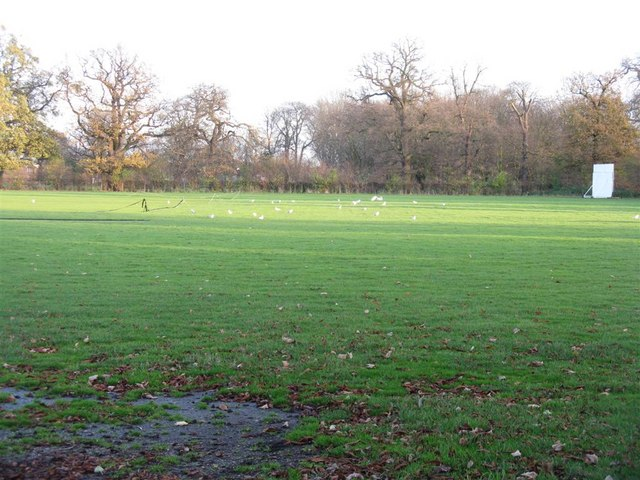
- Interactive map of Goldington Bury

Ground information
- Location: Goldington, Bedford, Bedfordshire
- Country: England
- Establishment: 1941 (first recorded match)

Team information
Bedfordshire	(1967–2003)
- As of 28 July 2010; Source: Ground profile

Goldington Bury is a cricket ground in the Goldington area of Bedford, in England. The first recorded match on the ground was in 1941, when Bedford Town played London Counties. The ground hosted its first Minor Counties Championship match when Bedfordshire played Hertfordshire in 1967. From 1967 to 2003, the ground played host to 32 Minor Counties Championship matches, with the final Minor Counties Championship match played at the ground seeing Bedfordshire host Northumberland. The ground has also hosted 2 MCCA Knockout Trophy matches.

The ground has also hosted List-A matches, the first played between Bedfordshire and Hampshire in the 1968 Gillette Cup. The ground has hosted 3 List-A matches involving Bedfordshire and a single match with Minor Counties South as the home side against Essex in the 1975 Benson & Hedges Cup.

In local domestic cricket, Goldington Bury is the home ground of Bedford Cricket Club and has been since the 1930s. The club was known under the name of Bedford Town Cricket Club until 2006, when it ceased operating, before reforming under its current name.
