= Begwary =

Hamlet in Bedfordshire, England

Coordinates: 52.20666°N 0.34864°W

- Location within Bedfordshire
- OS grid reference: TL129577
- Civil parish: Wyboston, Chawston and Colesden
- Unitary authority: Bedford
- Ceremonial county: Bedfordshire
- Region: East
- Country: England
- Sovereign state: United Kingdom
- Post town: BEDFORD
- Postcode district: MK44
- Dialling code: 01480
- Police: Bedfordshire
- Fire: Bedfordshire
- Ambulance: East of England
- UK Parliament: North Bedfordshire

Begwary is a small hamlet in the parish of Staploe in the Borough of Bedford, Bedfordshire, England.
