= Freeman's Common =

Land in Ravensden, Bedford

- Interactive map of Freeman's Common
- Type: Open space
- Location: Ravensden, Bedford
- Coordinates: 52.16738°N 0.45208°W
- Area: 12.5 hectares (31 acres)
- Created: 1858
- Operator: Bedford Borough Council
- Open: All year
- Status: Open

Freeman's Common is a 12.5 hectare area of land situated to the north of Bedford, in the parish of Ravensden. It was created in 1858. Over many years it has been the focus of local dispute as to whether the site should be developed. Despite the name, it is not in fact registered as common land.

== History ==
On 12 June 1797, an inclosure award created the Bedford Freeman's Common charity, following a 1795 Act of Parliament (35 Geo. 3. c. 87) which covered "Parishes of St. Paul, St. Peter and St. Cuthbert, Bedford". This charity held land which in 1858 was sold to the Midland Railway to build Bedford railway station. A new Freeman's Common was purchased near Ravensden to replace the original.

In 1867 Freemen's Common formed part of the course for the Grand National Hunt Steeplechases, which ran from close to Clapham Wood across to Kimbolton Road. The Prince of Wales (later Edward VII) attended the steeplechases on the second day, arriving in Bedford via the Midlands Railway. It also formed part of the 1868 course, although the race was less successful in its second year at Bedford, and was subsequently moved elsewhere.

In 1871 it was suggested to build a smallpox hospital on the Freeman's Common at Cleat Hill.

As of 1928 only four Freemen of Bedford remained with rights to graze animals on the Common.

On 22 September 1970 the original charity was merged with the Bedford Freeman's Trust Fund, and combined charity was registered as the Bedford Freeman's Common Charity.

In 2008 the site was proposed for development in the draft Local Plan, before the trustees had been consulted as to whether the site should be developed.

In 2016 the site was added to Bedford Borough Council's draft Local Plan 2035, but in February 2017 was withdrawn following a decision of the Executive Committee, based on a previous view expressed by a government planning inspector when considering the development of Woodlands Park.

In 2018 the Freeman's Common charity was merged with the House of Industry Estate – the trustees of both charities were the members of the General Purposes Committee of Bedford Borough Council.

In January 2022 a Deed of Easement was made for conduit of services across Freemen's Common, and proceeds of £110,000 were recorded in the House of Industry Estate accounts.

== Archaeology ==
An archaeological study in 2003 found no archaeological features of interest.
