= Colmworth =

Village and civil parish in England

Coordinates: 52.2136°N 0.3826°W

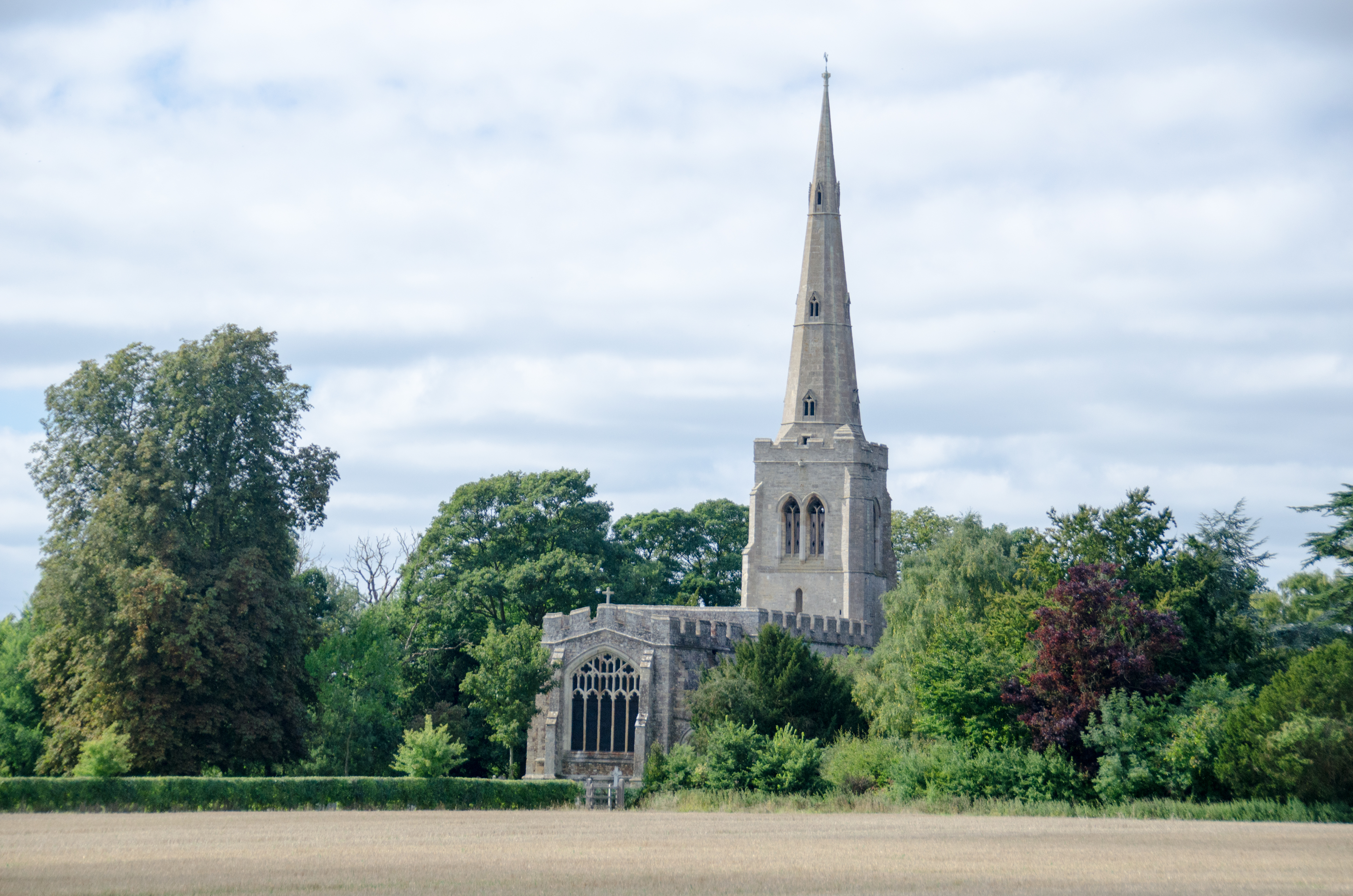
- St Denys' church, Colmworth

- Location within Bedfordshire
- Population: 393 (2011 Census including Duck's Cross)
- OS grid reference: TL106585
- Unitary authority: Bedford
- Ceremonial county: Bedfordshire
- Region: East
- Country: England
- Sovereign state: United Kingdom
- Post town: BEDFORD
- Postcode district: MK44
- Dialling code: 01234
- Police: Bedfordshire
- Fire: Bedfordshire
- Ambulance: East of England
- UK Parliament: North Bedfordshire

Colmworth is a village and civil parish in the Borough of Bedford in the county of Bedfordshire, England about 6.5 miles (10 km) north-east of Bedford.

The parish, including the hamlet of Duck's Cross, had a population of 393 at the 2011 census.

== Geography ==
Colmworth is 5 miles (8 km) west of St Neots, 21.5 miles (35 km) west of Cambridge and 50 miles (80 km) north of central London.

The village is separated by Colmworth Brook into two areas. To the north is the larger Church End and to the south is Chapel End.

Area

The civil parish covers an area of 868 hectares (2,145 acres).

Elevation

The village is about 70 metres (230 ft) above sea level. The land slopes down to 40 metres (131 ft) in the southeast of the parish.

Landscape

The village lies within the Bedfordshire and Cambridgeshire Claylands as designated by Natural England. Bedford Borough Council classifies the local landscape as Thurleigh Clay Farmland with large and open arable fields. Roads are mainly lined with hedges and trees interspersed with open stretches.

Geology and soil type

The parish lies on Oadby till above Oxford clay and Kellaways beds.

The soil is highly fertile, lime-rich, loamy and clayey with impeded drainage.

The night sky and light pollution

Light pollution is the level of radiance (night lights) shining up into the night sky. The Campaign to Protect Rural England (CPRE) divides the level of night sky brightness into 9 bands with band 1 being the darkest i.e. with the lowest level of light pollution and band 9 the brightest and most polluted. Colmworth is in bands 2 and 3

Roads and footpaths

The main road through the village goes north to Little Staughton and Pertenhall and south to Great Barford.

There is an extensive network of public footpaths in the south and west of the parish. A path runs south from Honeydon Road, Church End and reaches Wilden. Another runs west off Little Staughton Road to Bolnhurst.

== History ==
Evidence of Middle and Late Iron Age settlement discovered by archaeologists at Colley Hill Farm in 2011 was considered to be "locally and regionally significant".

A medieval moated enclosure, fishponds and fowling earthworks are at Manor Farm.

Population change in Colmworth since 1801
| Year | Pop. | ±% |
|---|---|---|
| 1801 | 347 | — |
| 1841 | 575 | +65.7% |
| 1881 | 385 | −33.0% |
| 1921 | 250 | −35.1% |
| 1961 | 309 | +23.6% |
| 2001 | 369 | +19.4% |

Colmworth Inclosure Act 1834
- Act of Parliament
- Parliament of the United Kingdom
- Long title: An Act for inclosing and exonerating from Tythes Lands in the Parish of Colmworth in the County of Bedford.
- Citation: 4 & 5 Will. 4. c. 13 Pr.

Dates
- Royal assent: 16 June 1834

Text of statute as originally enacted

The Colmworth Inclosure Act 1834 (4 & 5 Will. 4. c. 13 Pr.) was passed in 1834.

A Primitive Methodist Chapel opened in 1866.

The village hall was built in 1969. In 1995, a new apex roof replaced the flat one and a substantial refurbishment was carried out.

Colmworth Golf Course opened in 1991.

Colmworth CofE VC Lower School closed in August 2003 and the buildings, built circa 1968, used as a nursery.

The Colmworth Chronicle newsletter shows that the Post Office closed in 2009.

== Governance ==
The parish council consists of 7 elected councillors who serve a four-year term. Colmworth is in Wyboston ward for elections to the Borough of Bedford Unitary Authority.

Prior to 1894, Colmworth was administered as part of the hundred of Barford. From 1894 until 1974 it was in Bedford Rural District and from 1974 to 2009 in Bedford Borough.

Colmworth is in the North Bedfordshire parliamentary constituency. Before 1983 it was in Bedford constituency, then North Bedfordshire until 1997 and North East Bedfordshire until 2024.

== Church ==
St Denys church was built between 1426 and 1430 by Sir Gerard Braybrook. It is dedicated to the patron saint of France in honour of his French wife, Eleanor.

The church is part of the Wilden with Colmworth and Ravensden benefice in the Sharnbrook Deanery of the Diocese of St Albans.

== Community facilities and events ==
The village hall, owned and managed by a charitable trust, can seat up to 120. At the rear of the hall is a playing field with children's play area owned and maintained by the parish council.

A mobile Post Office serves the village Wednesday and Friday lunchtimes, and a mobile library fortnightly on Friday mornings.

A small 12 acres (5 ha) country park has been established on land bought by the parish council near to Manor Farm. There is a wildflower meadow, orchard, pond, bird hide and owl boxes. Colmworth Triangle Garden is a community garden established in 2013 adjacent to the Manor Barns and St Deny's Church.

Colmworth and North Bedfordshire is an 18-hole, par 72 golf course with a par 3 pitch and putt and 8 bay floodlit driving range.

The Colmworth Chronicle is a quarterly newsletter, first published in December 1986.

The grade II listed Cornfields Restaurant & Hotel dates back to the 17th century and was formerly The Wheatsheaf public house.

Since 2016, the Friends of St Denys' Church have held Cars and Bikes with Character rallies at Colmworth Village Hall, the first Sunday of the month from April to October to raise funds for church repairs.

== Public transport ==
Grant Palmer runs a two hourly bus service, Monday to Saturday, morning and early afternoon to Bedford plus one Thursday only return journey to St Neots.

The nearest railway station is St Neots.

== Businesses ==
Acorn Transport and Plant Hire, based at Duck's Cross was established in 1998 and move bulk materials. Acorn also does groundworks and is a registered waste carrier and processor; supplying recycled aggregates, topsoil, sands, stones and road plantings.
