= How End =

Hamlet in Bedfordshire, England

Coordinates: 52.05893°N 0.49215°W

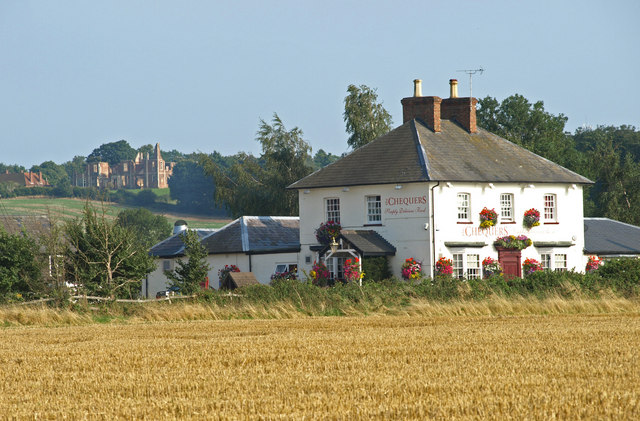
- The Chequers public house

- Location within Bedfordshire
- OS grid reference: TL034411
- Civil parish: Houghton Conquest
- Unitary authority: Central Bedfordshire
- Ceremonial county: Bedfordshire
- Region: East
- Country: England
- Sovereign state: United Kingdom
- Post town: BEDFORD
- Postcode district: MK45
- Dialling code: 01234
- Police: Bedfordshire
- Fire: Bedfordshire
- Ambulance: East of England
- UK Parliament: Mid Bedfordshire

How End is a hamlet located in the Central Bedfordshire district of Bedfordshire, England.

The settlement is close to the larger villages of Stewartby and Houghton Conquest. How End forms part of the Houghton Conquest civil parish.
