= Houghton Conquest =

Village in Bedfordshire, England

Coordinates: 52.06315°N 0.47396°W

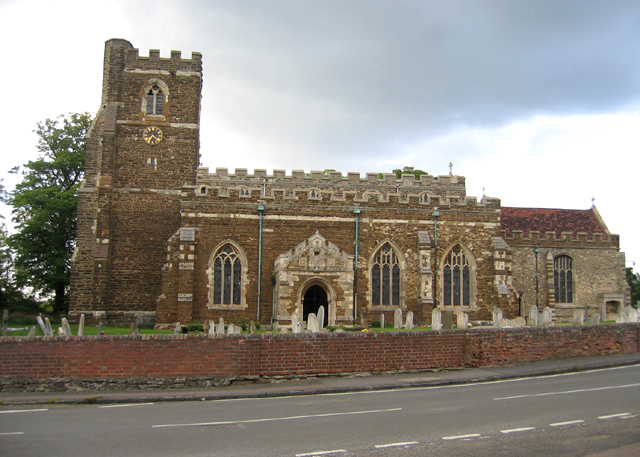
- All Saints' parish church

- Location within Bedfordshire
- Population: 1,514 (2011 Census)
- OS grid reference: TL047416
- Unitary authority: Central Bedfordshire
- Ceremonial county: Bedfordshire
- Region: East
- Country: England
- Sovereign state: United Kingdom
- Post town: BEDFORD
- Postcode district: MK45
- Dialling code: 01234
- Police: Bedfordshire
- Fire: Bedfordshire
- Ambulance: East of England
- UK Parliament: Mid Bedfordshire

Houghton Conquest is a village and civil parish located in the Central Bedfordshire district of Bedfordshire, England. The parish also includes the hamlet of How End.

== History ==
In the Domesday Book of 1086, Adeliza de Grandmesnil was tenant-in-chief of Houghton Conquest. It was held of her by one Arnold.

Historically in the hundred of Redbornestoke, the name of the village originated from the Conquest family who held a manor and lands in the area from the 13th century to the 18th century. The Houghton in Houghton Conquest is pronounced 'how-ton', and this has been the official pronunciation since at least 1998.

The Church of All Saints was constructed in the village during the 14th century, and is today the largest parish church in Bedfordshire. Features of interest include the wall paintings, sculpture, stained glass, benches and stalls. In 2018 all of the lead, weighing 21 tonnes, was stolen from the church roof.

== Manors ==
The Conquest family owned Conquestbury, a large manor which was left to ruin when the family left the area. The Conquestbury manor house stood near the southeast end of the village on the ground now known as Bury Farm, adjacent to London Lane. The Manor and its lands then passed to the Beauchamp family. Parts of the original house were used to build a house in the 1850s, which today serves as a village shop.

Arbella Stuart dined at "Mr Conquest's lodge" during her journey to London in October 1609. Houghton House was built in the area in approximately 1615. In 1794, Francis Russell, 5th Duke of Bedford stripped Houghton House of its furnishings and removed the roof. Today, the remains of Houghton House stand as ruins.

== Geography ==
The village is located in the northern part of Central Bedfordshire, on the border with the Borough of Bedford. Local amenities include a village shop, post office, Houghton Conquest Lower School, and a village hall.

== See also ==
- List of English and Welsh endowed schools (19th century)
