= Mark Rutherford School =

Secondary school in Bedford, England

Location
- Wentworth Drive; Putnoe; Bedford, Bedfordshire, MK41 8PX; England; 52°09′33″N 0°26′04″W

Information
- Type: Academy
- Established: 1973
- Local authority: Bedford
- Department for Education URN: 139160 Tables
- Ofsted: Reports
- Headteacher: Kelli Foster
- Gender: Mixed
- Age: 11 to 19
- Enrolment: 1,250 (approx)
- Website: https://www.markrutherford.beds.sch.uk/

Mark Rutherford School is a mixed secondary school and sixth form in Bedford, England. The school is named in honour of the Bedford-born writer William Hale White (1831-1913), who used Mark Rutherford as a pseudonym.

Mark Rutherford school educates pupils from age 11 through to 16. In addition, the school offers a sixth form provision for pupils age 16 to 19 wishing to study courses such as A levels. The school has a specialism in performing arts, and offers a range of courses related to the specialism.

== History ==
The school opened in 1973 as an upper school, educating children from the age of 13. However, in September 2010 children in academic years 7 and 8 of Woodside Middle School transferred to Mark Rutherford School, and year 7 pupils from Woodside now transfer to Mark Rutherford every year. This means that Mark Rutherford School now educates children from the age of 11, unlike many other secondary schools in the Borough of Bedford. Woodside Middle School formally closed in September 2011, though the site is still used by Putnoe Primary School which took over responsibility of Woodside's academic years 5 and 6.

In June 2012, the school launched a consultation on the possibility of converting to an academy. In September, governors of the school voted to convert to academy status, which commenced on 1 January 2013.

== Catchment ==
The school's catchment area covers Putnoe and Goldington, as well as some parts of Brickhill and Newnham. Middle and primary schools which fall into Mark Rutherford School's catchment area include Putnoe Primary School and Goldington Academy.

== Notable former pupils ==
- John Oliver, Emmy-winning comedian and writer
- Dave Hodgson, former Mayor of Bedford
- Rene Howe, Bedford Town football player
- Andy Johnson, ex-footballer for Crystal Palace and England
- John Turner, football player for Corby Town
- Greg Taylor, football player for Luton Town
- Nick Platnauer, ex footballer for Birmingham City, Leicester City and Coventry City
