= MK postcode area =

Postcode area within the United Kingdom, centred on Milton Keynes and Bedford

Milton Keynes
- Postcode area
- Coordinates: 52.064°N 0.662°W
- Country: United Kingdom
- Postcode area: MK
- Postcode area name: Milton Keynes
- Post towns: 5
- Postcode districts: 28
- Postcode sectors: 110
- Postcodes (live): 15,446
- Postcodes (total): 22,759
- Statistics as at May 2020

The MK postcode area, also known as the Milton Keynes postcode area, is a group of 26 postcode districts in England, within five post towns. These cover north Buckinghamshire (including Milton Keynes, Buckingham, Newport Pagnell and Olney), west and north Bedfordshire (including Bedford) and very small parts of Northamptonshire, Oxfordshire and Cambridgeshire.

== Coverage ==
The approximate coverage of the postcode districts:

Postcode district	Post town	Coverage	Local authority area(s)
MK1	MILTON KEYNES	Denbigh, Mount Farm	Milton Keynes
MK2	MILTON KEYNES	Brickfields, Central Bletchley, Fenny Stratford, Water Eaton	Milton Keynes
MK3	MILTON KEYNES	Church Green, Far Bletchley, Old Bletchley, Newton Leys, West Bletchley	Milton Keynes; Buckinghamshire
MK4	MILTON KEYNES	Emerson Valley, Furzton, Kingsmead, Oxley Park, Shenley Brook End, Snelshall West, Tattenhoe, Tattenhoe Park, Westcroft, Whaddon, Woodhill	Milton Keynes; Buckinghamshire
MK5	MILTON KEYNES	Crownhill, Elfield Park, Grange Farm, Oakhill, Knowlhill, Loughton, Medbourne, Shenley Brook End, Shenley Church End, Shenley Lodge, Shenley Wood	Milton Keynes
MK6	MILTON KEYNES	Ashland, Beanhill, Bleak Hall, Coffee Hall, Eaglestone, Fishermead, Leadenhall, Netherfield, Oldbrook, Peartree Bridge, Redmoor, Springfield, Tinkers Bridge, Woughton on the Green, Woughton Park, Simpson, Winterhill	Milton Keynes
MK7	MILTON KEYNES	Browns Wood, Caldecotte, Kents Hill, Tilbrook, Walton, Walton Hall, Wavendon, Wavendon Gate, Old Farm Park	Milton Keynes
MK8	MILTON KEYNES	Crownhill, Grange Farm, Great Holm, Hazeley, Loughton, Loughton Lodge, Two Mile Ash, Whitehouse, Wymbush	Milton Keynes
MK9	MILTON KEYNES	Central Milton Keynes, Campbell Park	Milton Keynes
MK10	MILTON KEYNES	Brinklow, Broughton, Kingston, Middleton, Monkston, Oakgrove	Milton Keynes
MK11	MILTON KEYNES	Fairfields, Fullers Slade, Galley Hill, Kiln Farm, Stony Stratford	Milton Keynes
MK12	MILTON KEYNES	Greenleys, Hodge Lea, Old Wolverton, Stacey Bushes, Wolverton, Wolverton Mill	Milton Keynes
MK13	MILTON KEYNES	Bancroft/Bancroft Park, Blue Bridge, Bradwell and Bradwell Abbey, Bradwell Common, New Bradwell, Heelands, Stonebridge	Milton Keynes
MK14	MILTON KEYNES	Blakelands, Conniburrow, Downs Barn, Giffard Park, Great Linford, Linford Wood, Oakridge Park, Stantonbury, Neath Hill, Redhouse Park	Milton Keynes
MK15	MILTON KEYNES	Bolbeck Park, Downhead Park, Fox Milne, Newlands, Pennyland, Pineham, Northfield, Tongwell, Willen Park, Willen, Willen Lake, Great Woolstone, Little Woolstone	Milton Keynes
MK16	NEWPORT PAGNELL	Astwood, Broughton, Chicheley, Filgrave, Gayhurst, Hardmead, Lathbury, Little Crawley, Moulsoe, North Crawley, Newport Pagnell, Sherington, Stoke Goldington, Tyringham	Milton Keynes; West Northamptonshire
MK17	MILTON KEYNES	Aspley Guise, Battlesden, Bow Brickhill, Drayton Parslow, Eversholt, Great Brickhill, Great Horwood, Hulcote, Little Brickhill, Little Horwood, Milton Bryan, Mursley, Nash, Newton Longville, Potsgrove, Salford, Stoke Hammond, Swanbourne, Thornton, Tingrith, Wavendon, Whaddon, Woburn, Woburn Sands	Buckinghamshire; Central Bedfordshire; Milton Keynes
MK18	BUCKINGHAM	Addington, Adstock, Akeley, Barton Hartshorn, Botolph Claydon, Buckingham, Calvert, Chackmore, Chetwode, Dadford, Dunton, East Claydon, Finmere, Foscott, Gawcott, Granborough, Hillesden, Hoggeston, Leckhamstead, Lillingstone Dayrell, Lillingstone Lovell, Maids Moreton, Middle Claydon, Newton Purcell, North Marston, Padbury, Shalstone, Steeple Claydon, Tingewick, Thornborough, Water Stratford, Winslow	Buckinghamshire; Cherwell
MK19	MILTON KEYNES	Beachampton, Calverton, Castlethorpe, Cosgrove, Deanshanger, Hanslope, Haversham, Little Linford, Long Street, Old Stratford, Passenham, Upper Weald, Wicken	Buckinghamshire; Milton Keynes; West Northamptonshire
MK40	BEDFORD	Biddenham, Castle, De Parys, Great Denham, Harpur, Queens Park	Bedford
MK41	BEDFORD	Brickhill, Clapham, De Parys, Goldington, Harpur, Newnham, Putnoe, Renhold, Salph End	Bedford
MK42	BEDFORD	Castle, Cauldwell, Elstow, Harrowden, Kempston, Kingsbrook, Shortstown, Wixams	Bedford
MK43	BEDFORD	Bourne End, Brogborough, Box End, Bromham, Cranfield, Carlton, Felmersham, Harrold, Husborne Crawley, Keeley Green, Kempston Rural, Lidlington, Lower Shelton, Marston Moretaine, Newton Blossomville, Oakley, Odell, Pavenham, Podington, Radwell, Ridgmont, Stagsden, Stevington, Stewartby, Turvey, Upper Shelton, West End, Wood End, Wootton, Wootton Green	Bedford; Central Bedfordshire; Milton Keynes
MK44	BEDFORD	Begwary, Bletsoe, Blunham, Bolnhurst, Cardington, Chawston, Colesden, Colmworth, Cople, Duck's Cross, Great Barford, Keysoe, Keysoe Row, Kingsbrook, Knotting, Knotting Green, Little Staughton, Melchbourne, Milton Ernest, Moggerhanger, Pertenhall, Ravensden, Riseley, Roxton, Sharnbrook, Souldrop, Swineshead, Thurleigh, Top End, Wilden, Willington, Wyboston, Yelden	Bedford; Huntingdonshire
MK45	BEDFORD	Ampthill, Barton-le-Clay, Clophill, Cotton End, Flitton, Flitwick, Gravenhurst, Greenfield, Haynes, Haynes Church End, Herring's Green, Houghton Conquest, How End, Kempston Hardwick, Maulden, Millbrook, Pulloxhill, Sharpenhoe, Silsoe, Steppingley, Westoning, Wilstead	Bedford; Central Bedfordshire
MK46	OLNEY	Clifton Reynes, Cold Brayfield, Emberton, Lavendon, Olney, Ravenstone, Warrington, Weston Underwood	Milton Keynes
MK77	MILTON KEYNES	Morgan Stanley Processing Centre (geographically in MK11)	non-geographic

== Map ==
MK postcode area map, showing postcode districts in red and post towns in grey text, with links to nearby HP, LU, NN, OX, PE and SG postcode areas.

== See also ==
- Postcode Address File
- List of postcode areas in the United Kingdom
