= Great Barford Bridge =

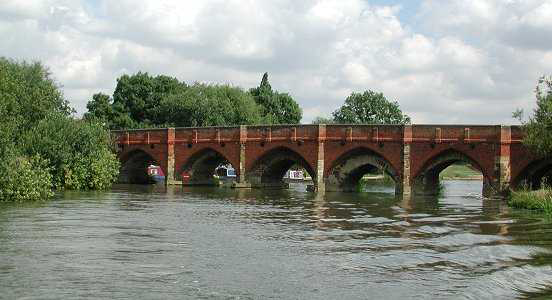
- Coordinates: 52°09′04″N 0°20′36″W
- Crosses: River Great Ouse
- Locale: Great Barford, Bedfordshire
- Heritage status: Grade I listed

History
- Opened: Fifteenth century

Location
- Interactive map of Great Barford Bridge

The early fifteenth century Great Barford Bridge, sometimes called simply Barford Bridge, spans the River Great Ouse at Great Barford, Bedfordshire. It is an arch bridge with seventeen arches, originally built from limestone and sandstone. The bridge underwent significant changes in the 19th century, with a widening project in 1818 that used wood being superseded in 1874 with the use of brick. It is Grade I listed and a Scheduled Ancient Monument.

There is also a Barford Bridge which carries the River Ise over the A43 road between Rushton and Geddington in Northamptonshire.

== History ==
=== Early Construction (15th Century) ===
The origins of Great Barford Bridge date to the early 15th century. Its construction is commonly associated with a bequest from Sir Gerard Braybrooke, who in his will, proved in 1429, left funds for the completion of "the briyge of Berford in Bedfordshyr be perfourmed and finished with my goods". This indicates that the bridge was either completed or significantly advanced through his patronage.

=== Economic Importance and Regional Impact ===
By the mid-15th century, the bridge had become an important crossing over the River Great Ouse. Records from the 1440s show that the burgesses of Bedford complained that the bridge diverted trade and traffic away from the town, demonstrating its growing economic significance. The bridge formed part of a regional route, reinforcing its importance as a crossing point prior to the development of alternative routes via Bedford.

=== Structural Development and Early Descriptions ===
The bridge appears to have developed over time rather than being constructed in a single phase. In the 1530s, the antiquary John Leland described the bridge as having eight stone arches, suggesting that the present seventeen-arch structure resulted from later extensions and modifications. This indicates that the bridge was progressively extended across the floodplain rather than built in a single phase, with the large number of arches reflecting the need to span both the main river channel and its surrounding floodplain.

=== Turnpike Era and Maintenance (18th Century) ===
Before the navigation of the River Great Ouse was extended to Bedford, Great Barford served as an important head of navigation, contributing to the strategic importance of the crossing.

In 1772, the road over the bridge was incorporated into a turnpike, with tolls used to fund maintenance and improvement of the route. Further repairs were undertaken in 1781 under the direction of John Wing, reflecting the continued importance of the structure.

=== 19th Century Alterations ===
Significant changes to the bridge were made in the 19th century. In 1818, the structure was widened using timber construction to accommodate increased traffic. This temporary solution was later replaced in 1874 with brick, giving the bridge much of its present appearance.

The bridge has remained in continuous use since its construction.

== Description ==
Great Barford Bridge is a multi-arched stone bridge consisting of seventeen arches of varying sizes, reflecting its phased construction over time. The structure extends to approximately 140 metres in length and around 5 metres in width, forming a long, low crossing over the River Great Ouse and its surrounding floodplain.

The bridge is constructed primarily of limestone and sandstone, with later alterations incorporating brick, particularly as part of the 19th-century widening. The arches are irregular in form, with a mixture of pointed and segmental profiles, indicating multiple phases of development.

Architectural features include triangular cutwaters projecting from the piers, designed to reduce water resistance and improve structural stability. The bridge also retains stone parapets and sections of dentilled corbelling, contributing to its historic character.

The overall form of the bridge reflects its evolution from a medieval structure into a widened crossing adapted for later traffic, combining original stonework with subsequent brick additions.

The bridge is designated as a Grade I listed structure and a Scheduled Ancient Monument, reflecting its exceptional historical and architectural significance.
