= Renhold Chapel =

Coordinates: 52.1599°N 0.3907°W

Renhold Chapel is a Baptist chapel in the village of Renhold, Bedfordshire, England.

== History ==
Prior to the chapel being built, the chapel meetings on Sunday mornings were held in various homes around the village with 50-60 people attending. These meetings would take the format of a prayer meeting, sometimes with an address. There was also a midweek meeting held in different cottages.

When it came to finding a location to build the chapel, many visits were made to Howbury Hall requesting a piece of land to build on,

There was opposition from the vicar of the Anglican Church in the village along with Captain Polhill Turner, who practically owned the whole of the village and lived at Howbury Hall.

Renhold Baptist Chapel was built in 1873 with the opening services taking place on 16 September 1873. There was a Sunday school in the morning followed by a Prayer meeting, then afternoon and evening services. George Laughton was the first secretary and Sunday School Superintendent. After Laughton emigrated to Canada, both posts were taken over by George Harlow. Alterations and modernisation have taken place to the Chapel over the years.

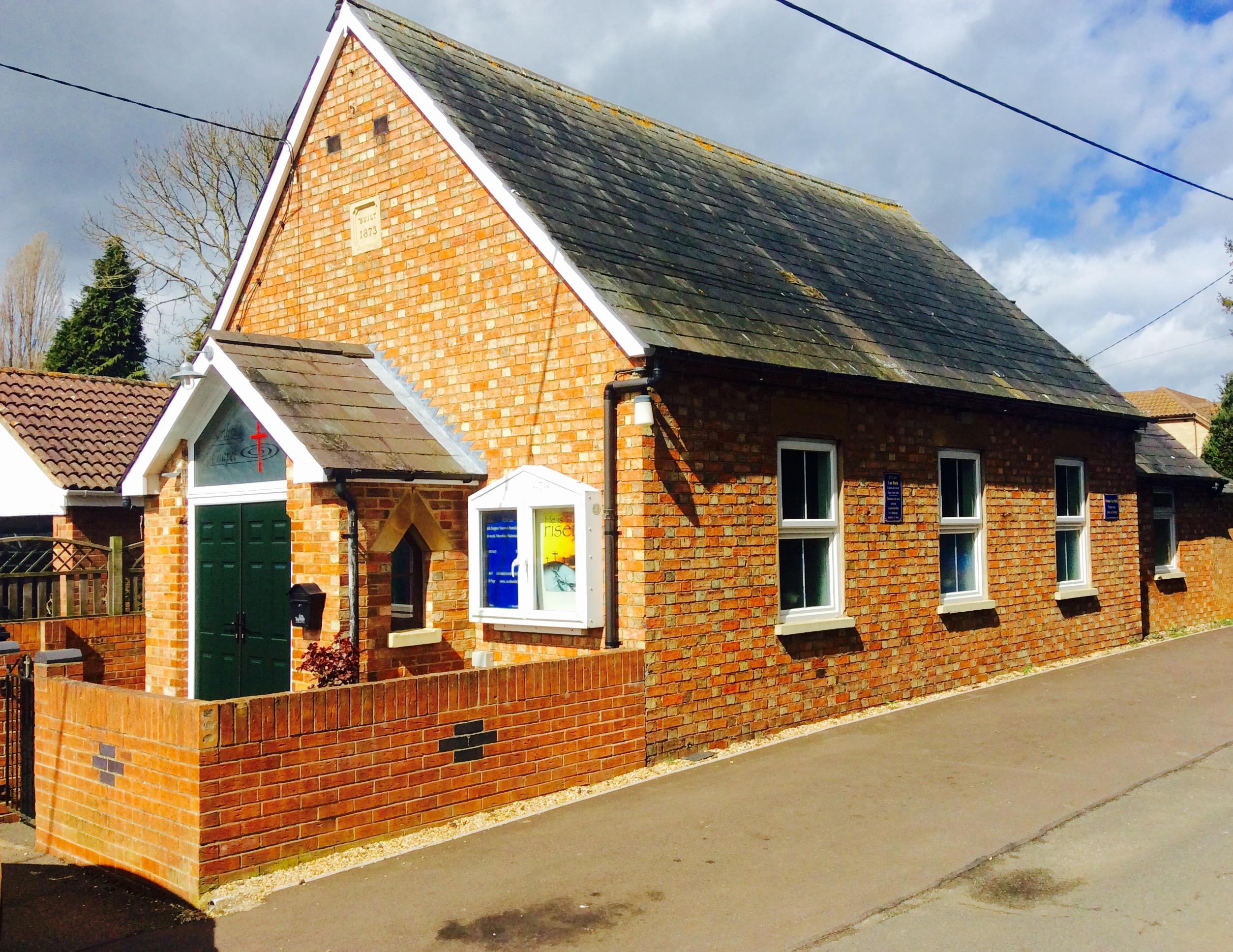
Renhold Baptist Chapel

The 140th Anniversary of the chapel was celebrated between 14 and 16 September 2013. There was a family fun day in some of the local gardens along with a historical exhibition on the Saturday in the Chapel Building. On the Sunday morning there was a family service and a Thanksgiving service on the Monday evening reflecting the pattern of Sunday and Monday services that took place in the earlier days of the chapel.
