= Duck's Cross =

Hamlet in Bedfordshire, England

Coordinates: 52.19498°N 0.37611°W

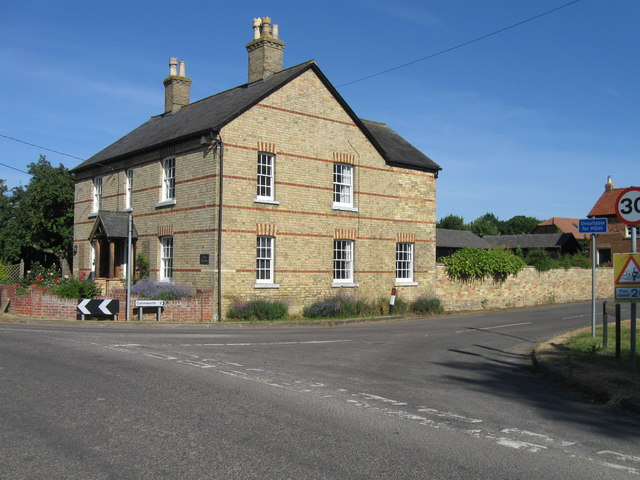
- Duck's Cross

- Location within Bedfordshire
- OS grid reference: TL110564
- Civil parish: Colmworth
- Unitary authority: Bedford
- Ceremonial county: Bedfordshire
- Region: East
- Country: England
- Sovereign state: United Kingdom
- Post town: BEDFORD
- Postcode district: MK44
- Dialling code: 01234
- Police: Bedfordshire
- Fire: Bedfordshire
- Ambulance: East of England
- UK Parliament: North Bedfordshire

Duck's Cross is a hamlet located in the Borough of Bedford in Bedfordshire, England.

The settlement forms part of Colmworth civil parish, though Duck's Cross is located nearer to the villages of Wilden, and Colesden.
