= Priory Country Park =

Country park in Bedford, England

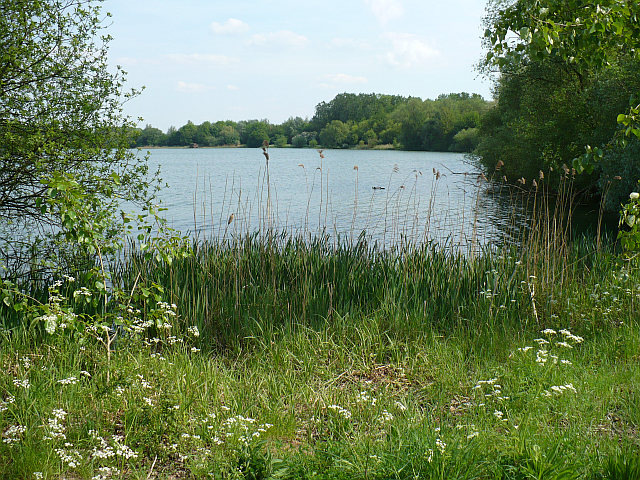
- Interactive map of Priory Country Park
- Type: country park
- Location: Bedford, Bedfordshire; England
- Coordinates: 52.131972°N 0.434981°W
- Created: 1986
- Operator: Bedford Borough Council
- Status: Open all year

Priory Country Park is a country park located in the Newnham area of Bedford, England alongside the River Great Ouse. The park is managed by Bedford Borough Council.

The park was established after gravel extraction ended in 1977. It was officially opened in 1986 by Valerie Singleton. It covers an area of 300 acres (121 hectares), with habitats including lakes, grassland and woodland, and is noted as a birdwatching site. It includes the Priory Marina and Cardington Artificial Slalom Course, and the largest lake is home to a sailing club. There is also a Beefeater Grill and Premier Inn by the park entrance.

Priory Country Park won a Green Flag Award in 2007.

The wall alongside the marina is constructed from stones which were once part of the former Augustinian monastery that occupied part of the site. It also contains Roman bricks from an earlier Roman farmhouse that preceded it.

== See also ==
- Bedford Park
- Newnham Priory
