= Newnham, Bedford =

Area of the town of Bedford, England

Coordinates: 52.1379°N 0.42904°W

Newnham
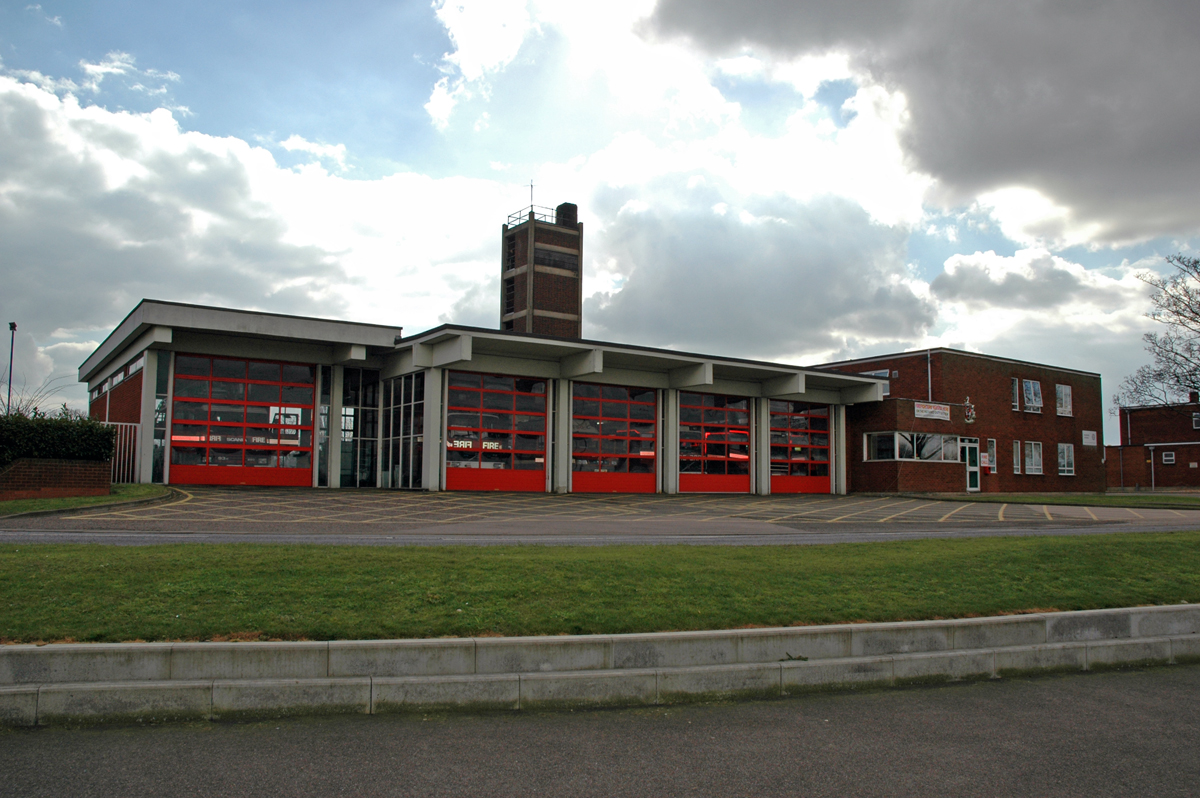
- Bedford Fire Station, located in Newnham

- Location within Bedfordshire
- Population: 5,510; 7,784 (2011 census)
- OS grid reference: TL076500
- Unitary authority: Bedford
- Ceremonial county: Bedfordshire
- Region: East
- Country: England
- Sovereign state: United Kingdom
- Post town: BEDFORD
- Postcode district: MK41
- Dialling code: 01234
- Police: Bedfordshire
- Fire: Bedfordshire
- Ambulance: East of England
- UK Parliament: Bedford

Newnham is an electoral ward and area within the town of Bedford, Bedfordshire, England.

The boundaries of Newnham are approximately Goldington Road to the north, the River Great Ouse to the south and east, with Denmark Street and George Street to the west.

The Riverfield housing estate, and Bedford's Priory Country Park and Marina are within the boundaries of Newnham ward as well as a number of other key facilities for Bedford town. After boundary changes in 2011, the Newnham area also includes the western section of the Castle Road neighbourhood.

== History ==
A Neolithic henge was erected on the site of the current Tesco Supermarket on Riverfield Drive dating between 4000 and 2000 BC. Despite this there is very little evidence of any major settlement in Newnham in pre-historic times.

There was a Roman farmstead near the River Great Ouse that was excavated by archeologists in the 1970s before there was gravel extraction on the site that is now Priory Country Park.

Risinghoe Castle was built in the area sometime after the Norman Invasion of 1066. Newnham derives its name from Newnham Priory which was established on the banks of the River Great Ouse by Simon de Beauchamp, Baron of Bedford in 1165. The de Beauchamp family were the owners of Bedford Castle as well as Risinghoe Castle, and were an important family in medieval Bedford and England. The priory was dissolved by King Henry VIII in 1541.

Much of the western section of the Castle Road neighbourhood was developed in the 19th century. The rest of Newnham remained as undeveloped farmland and a site for gravel extraction until the 20th century. By then the expansion of Bedford required more housing and land either side of Newnham Avenue was developed in the interwar period. Bedford's old power station was built in the area in 1955 and was subsequently demolished in 1987. The final stage of Newnham's development happened during the early 1990s. With the demolition of the old power station, the land was redeveloped into the Priory Marina and country park, as well as Aspects Leisure Park and the Riverfield housing estate.

In 2020 planning permission was granted for the redevelopment of Aspects Leisure Park to include housing, additional restaurants and retail space and a public park. The development will be renamed 'Newnham Park'.

== Governance ==
Newnham is an unparished area, with all community services under the direct control of Bedford Borough Council. Newnham elects two councillors to Bedford Borough Council.

== Economy ==
There are a number of shops and services located on Newnham Avenue, including a post office, a supermarket, a pub, petrol station and a food store. There are a few more shops located on Wendover Drive, including a hairdressers, and a cafe. There are also some smaller independent shops and businesses located in the western section Castle Road neighbourhood.

The Aspects Leisure Park is situated in Newnham. This entertainment complex (located on Newnham Avenue and Barkers Lane) houses a cinema, a Bingo Hall, a fitness gym plus other restaurants. It is also the site of Bedford's main fire station and a car dealership. Further along Barkers Lane is a small industrial estate, Bedford's Marina.

== Education ==
Unusually there are no state schools or independent schools in Newnham. Most school age children in the area attend a school in nearby Goldington or Castle.

== Religious sites ==
- Priory Methodist Church, located on Newnham Avenue
- Christ Church Bedford (Church of England), located on Denmark Street and Goldington Road
- Three Rivers Church, also on Denmark Street

== Community facilities ==
The Bedford International Athletics Stadium is located in the Newnham area, on Barkers Lane. The stadium has played host to many important athletics meetings in the past and Paula Radcliffe has trained there. It is also home to Bedford Tigers RLFC and the Bedfordshire Blue Raiders American Football team.

The stadium was an official training site for the 2012 Summer Olympics and Paralympics. The venue accommodated athletes training for the event, and complemented other training sites in the Bedford area. The Maldives National Olympic Committee based its competing athletes in Bedford, while Paralympic athletes from Angola, the Central African Republic, Democratic Republic of the Congo, The Gambia, Ghana, Côte d'Ivoire, Jamaica, Lesotho, Morocco, Niger, Pakistan, Senegal, Tunisia and Uganda were also based in the area. With the exception of Weymouth (which hosted various sailing events) Bedford accommodated more Olympic teams in 2012 than any other town or borough in the UK.

Priory Country Park is located on Barkers Lane, and is Newnham's main open space. There is also a provision of allotments further along Barkers Lane.
