= Roxton, Bedfordshire =

Village in Bedfordshire, England

Coordinates: 52.176°N 0.311°W

Roxton
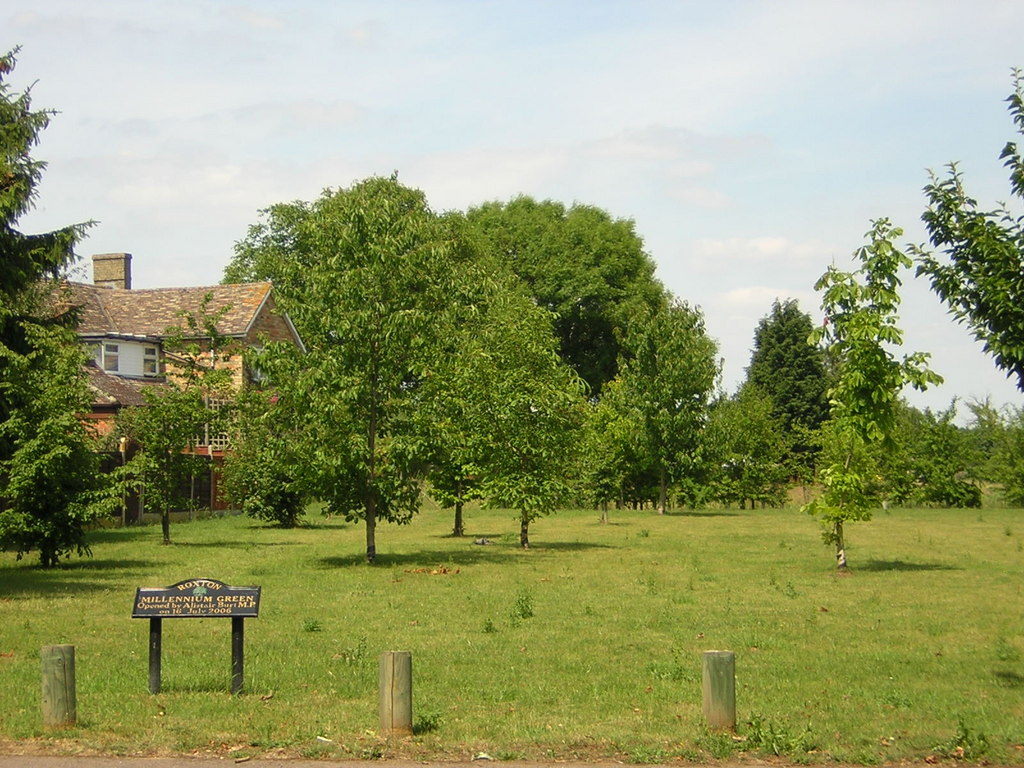
- Millennium Green

- Location within Bedfordshire
- Population: 348 (2011 Census)
- OS grid reference: TL154995
- Unitary authority: Bedford
- Ceremonial county: Bedfordshire
- Region: East
- Country: England
- Sovereign state: United Kingdom
- Post town: BEDFORD
- Postcode district: MK44
- Dialling code: 01234
- Police: Bedfordshire
- Fire: Bedfordshire
- Ambulance: East of England
- UK Parliament: North Bedfordshire

Roxton is a small village and civil parish in the Borough of Bedford, Bedfordshire, England about 7 miles (11 km) north-east of the county town of Bedford.

The 2011 census gives the population of Roxton as 348.

== History ==
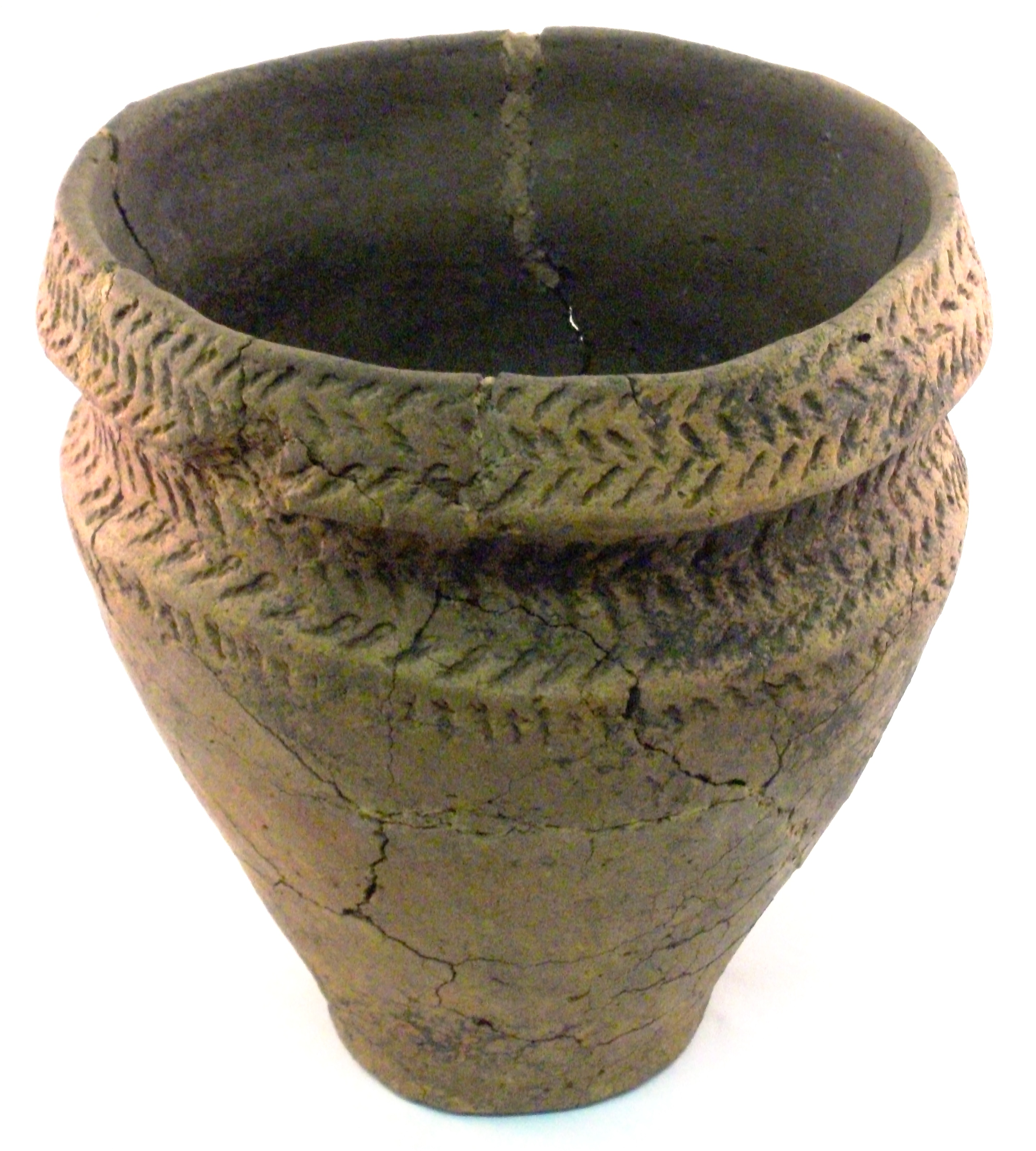
Cremation urn found in Roxton

In the 1970s, a Bronze Age barrow cemetery in the form of five ring ditches was excavated prior to gravel extraction. Two urned primary cremation burials were found. The site, near to the Ouse, is now a lake.

Archaeological evidence of Romano-British occupation was found in trenches dug in 2007 east of the Black Cat roundabout.

Roxton is mentioned in the Domesday Book. The entry reads: Rochesdone/stone: Rhiwallon from Hugh de Beauchamp; William Speke. Mill (260 eels).

The hamlets of Chawston and Colesden were part of Roxton civil parish until 1 April 2007, when they together with Wyboston (part of Roxton parish from 1965) separated to form a new civil parish.

== Governance ==
Roxton Parish Council has seven elected members and meets bi-monthly in the parish hall. Roxton is part of Wyboston ward for elections to the Borough of Bedford Unitary Authority.

Prior to 1894, Roxton was administered as part of the Barford Hundred. From 1894 until 1974 the village was in Bedford Rural District and since 1974 in Bedford Borough.

The village is in the North Bedfordshire constituency. Until 2024, it was in North East Bedfordshire and before 1997 in the Bedford constituency.

== Geography ==
Roxton is 4 miles (6 km) southwest of St Neots, 18.5 miles (30 km) west of Cambridge and 47 miles (76 km) north of Central London.

The civil parish covers an area of 294 hectares (726 acres).

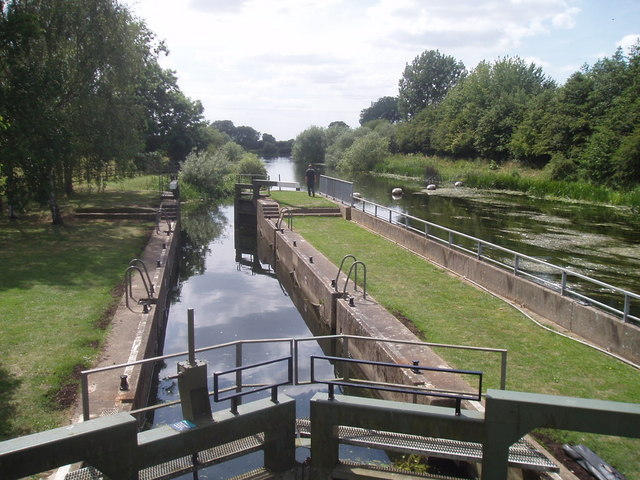
Roxton Lock (canal)

The River Great Ouse forms the parish's eastern and most of its southern boundary, and the A421 road its western.

The village centre is 25 metres (82 ft) above sea level. The whole parish is low lying and flat.

=== Landscape ===
The village lies within the Bedfordshire and Cambridgeshire Claylands as designated by Natural England. Bedford Borough Council classifies the local landscape as the Great Ouse Clay Valley. The surrounding area is mostly arable farmland. Roxton Park is an area of grassland dotted with mature trees. There are lakes formed from old sand and gravel pits in the southeast corner of the parish by the Ouse. A sand and gravel quarry is being worked east of the Black Cat roundabout by Breedon Aggregates.

=== Geology and soil type ===
The village lies mainly on third terrace river gravel. Boulder clay is to the south and west, and first and second terrace river gravel to the east. Alluvium borders the Great Ouse. Underlying these superficial deposits is Oxford clay and Kellaways beds.

Around the village the soil has low fertility, is freely draining and slightly acid with a loamy texture. The southwestern part of the parish has highly fertile, lime-rich loamy and clayey soils with impeded drainage. By the Great Ouse are loamy and clayey floodplain soils with naturally high groundwater.

=== Light pollution ===
Light pollution is the level of radiance (night lights) shining up into the night sky. The Campaign to Protect Rural England (CPRE) divides the level of night sky brightness into 9 bands with band 1 being the darkest i.e. with the lowest level of light pollution and band 9 the brightest and most polluted. Roxton in band 5 and 6 is adversely affected by lighting along the A1/A421 Black Cat roundabout. The night sky is darker looking northwest.

=== A1 road bridges ===
The A1 northbound carriageway is carried over the Ouse by a sandstone bridge built in October 1820. Listing particulars state the bridge to be about 50 metres (164 ft) long and 10 metres (33 ft) wide. There are three broad, low arches built with blocks of Bramley Fall stone from a quarry near Leeds. A rounded towpath archway passes through the east abutment. A sandstone parapet rests on a projecting stone string course. Except where replaced by concrete, Bramley Fall stone copings run the length of the bridge. Inscriptions of masons can be seen on the inside face of the copings over the crown of the centre arch. Flood bridges to the east and west have seven smaller and lower segmental brick arches. A separate bridge was built for the southbound carriageway when the road was dualled in the early 1960s.

=== Public footpaths ===
The Ouse Valley Way passes through the village and runs alongside the Ouse to the south and east.

== Village facilities ==
The Royal Oak public house closed in 2022 after having been licensed since at least 1819. A cafe and post office remain in the rear courtyard.

Roxton CE Academy caters for up to 90 children aged from 3 to 11 and is governed locally under the auspices of The Diocese of St Albans Multi-Academy Trust. The school buildings date from 1963.

Roxton Garden Centre on Bedford Road includes a restaurant and maze.

== Public transport ==
Roxton is served by the regional Stagecoach X5 bus route; east to St Neots and Cambridge and west to Bedford, Milton Keynes and Oxford.

The nearest railway stations are Sandy and St Neots.

== Church and chapel ==
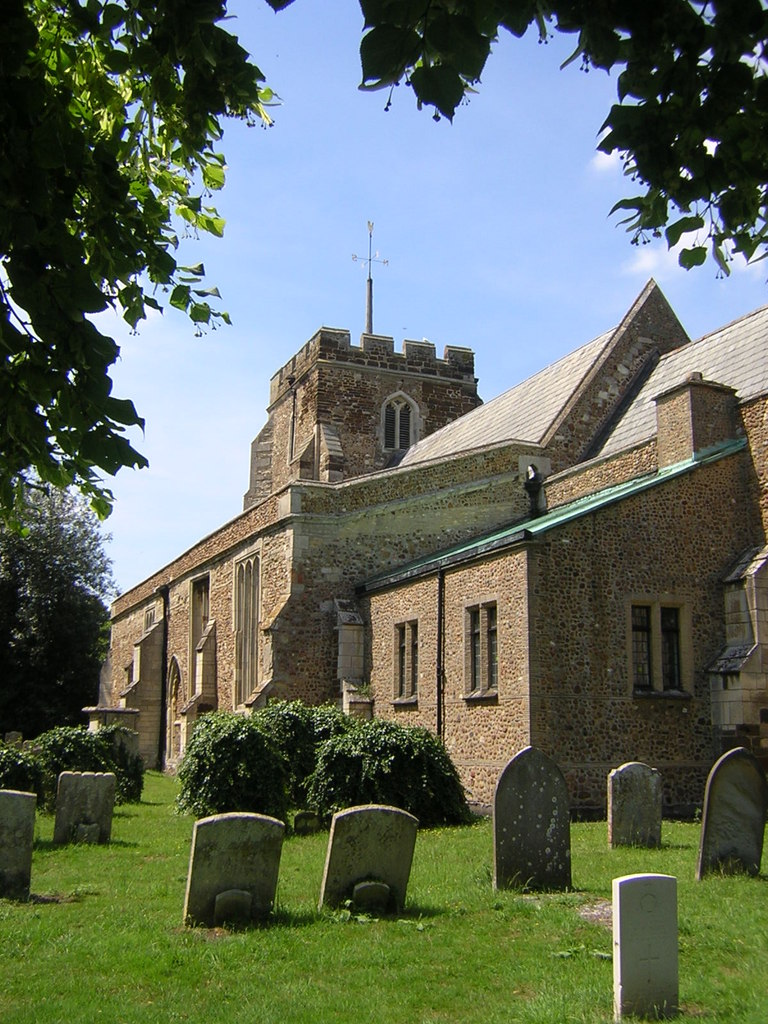
Church of St Mary Magdalene

The Grade II* listed Parish Church of St Mary Magdalene dates from the 14th century and is built of rich brown cobblestones with ashlar dressings and slate roofs. The 15th century western tower is single–stage with northeast and southwest buttresses to an embattled parapet. There is a ring of five bells; the oldest are dated 1591 and 1607.

The church is in the Biggleswade Deanery and the Diocese of St Albans. Along with the ecclesiastical parishes of Blunham, Great Barford and Tempsford with Little Barford, Roxton is part of the Riversmeet Benefice.

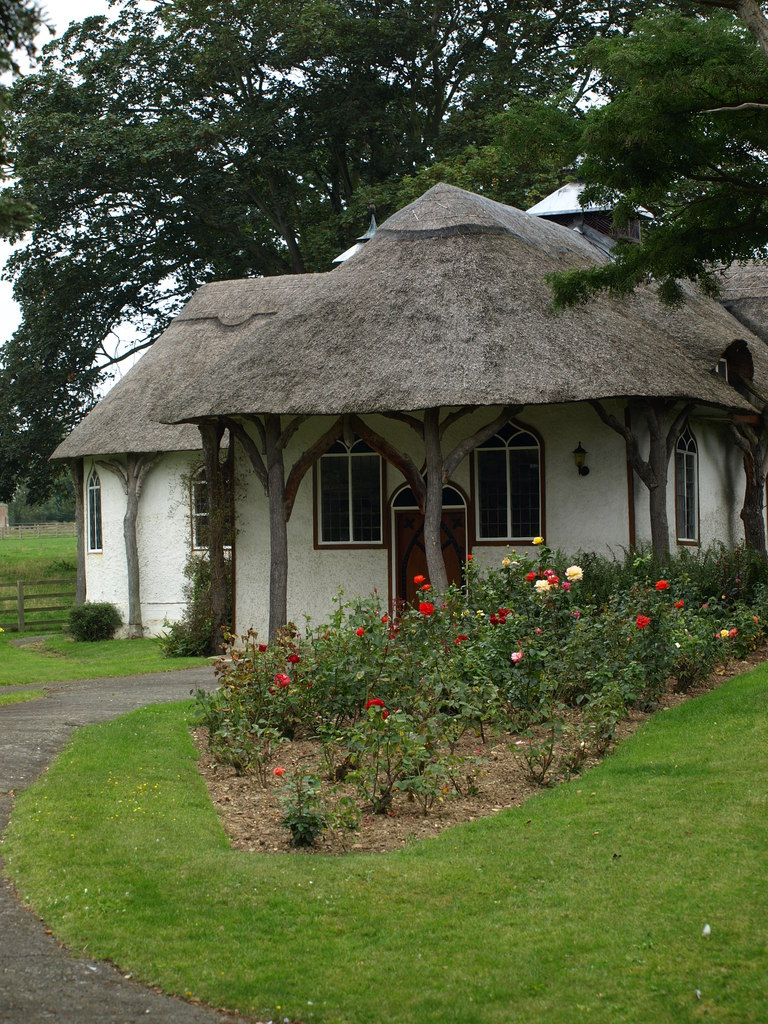
Roxton Congregational Chapel

The Roxton Congregational Chapel, also Grade II* listed, originates from 1808, when meetings were held in a barn. The chapel was formally established in 1822 and the barn converted into a thatched cottage orné-style chapel. In the 1830s two wings were added; one for the vestry and the other for the village school and Sunday School.

The chapel is an independent Christian church affiliated to the Congregational Federation. The church had a pastor until at least 1947 but nowadays external preachers come from a variety of denominations. Administration of the church is by three, annually elected, voluntary deacons. Decision-making is by church members through the church meeting.

== Community events ==
Roxton Flower Show is held annually in August. According to the Parish Council website the 2019 show was the 65th such event.

== Notable people ==
- Wayne Larkins, a former Northamptonshire and England cricketer was born in Roxton.
