= Salph End =

Village in Bedfordshire, England

Coordinates: 52.16551°N 0.42521°W

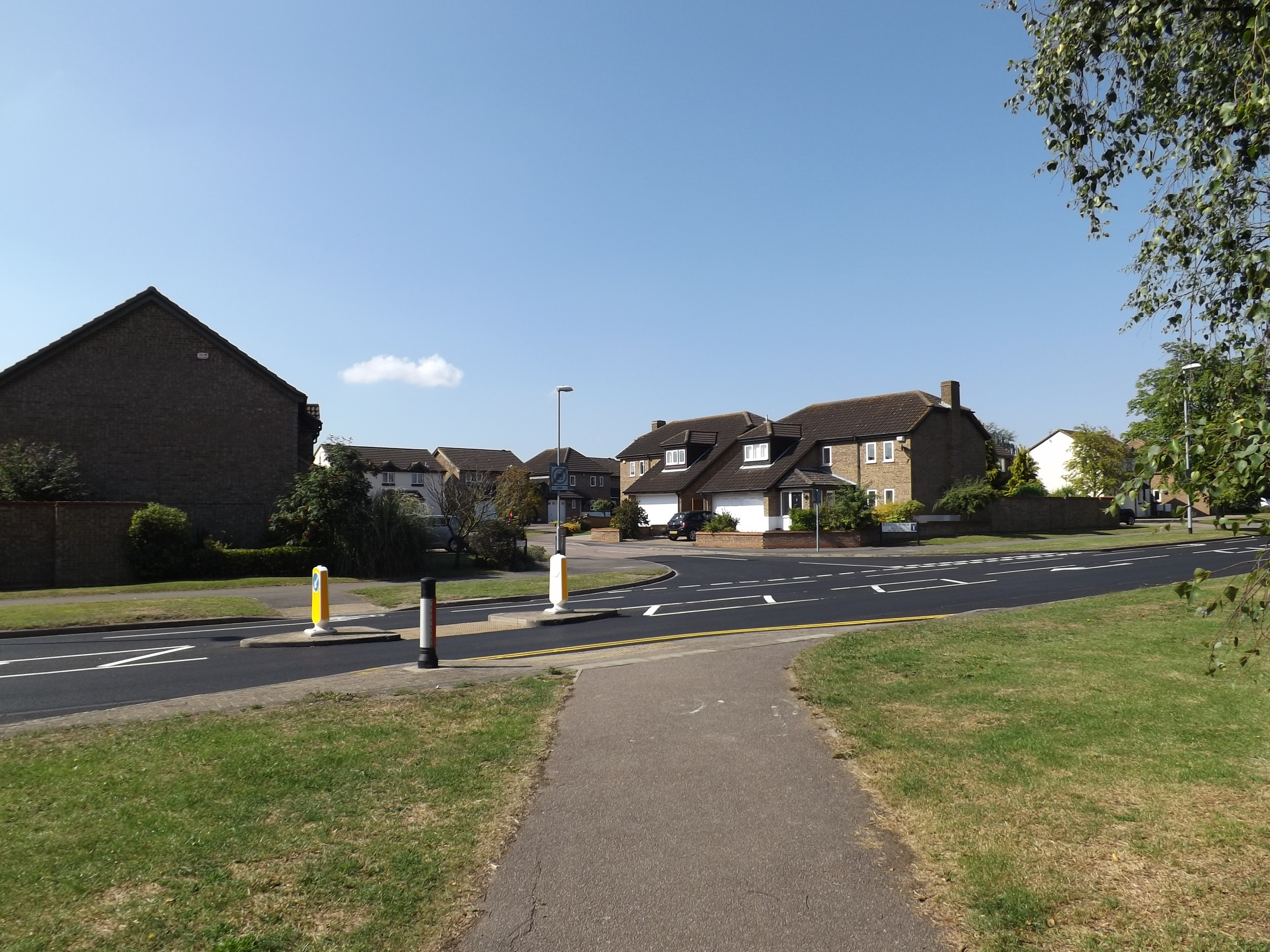
- Buckfast Avenue, Salph End

- Location within Bedfordshire
- OS grid reference: TL078530
- Civil parish: Renhold
- Unitary authority: Bedford
- Ceremonial county: Bedfordshire
- Region: East
- Country: England
- Sovereign state: United Kingdom
- Post town: BEDFORD
- Postcode district: MK41
- Dialling code: 01234
- Police: Bedfordshire
- Fire: Bedfordshire
- Ambulance: East of England
- UK Parliament: North Bedfordshire

Salph End is a village located in the Borough of Bedford in Bedfordshire, England.

Officially, Salph End is one of the hamlets (or "Ends") of Renhold, and is the westernmost settlement within Renhold's civil parish. However, it is also one of the largest and most distinct settlements within Renhold, and is designated a separate village by Ordnance Survey.

The name comes from sealh hoh (later Salcho) which was Old English for ‘Spur of land with willows on it’ plus "End".

It was named in the Domesday Book in 1086 with a value of 5 pounds with 8 ploughlands, 2 ploughs of meadow and woodland for 50 pigs.
