= Risinghoe Castle =

Mound in Bedfordshire, England

- Bedford, Bedfordshire, England
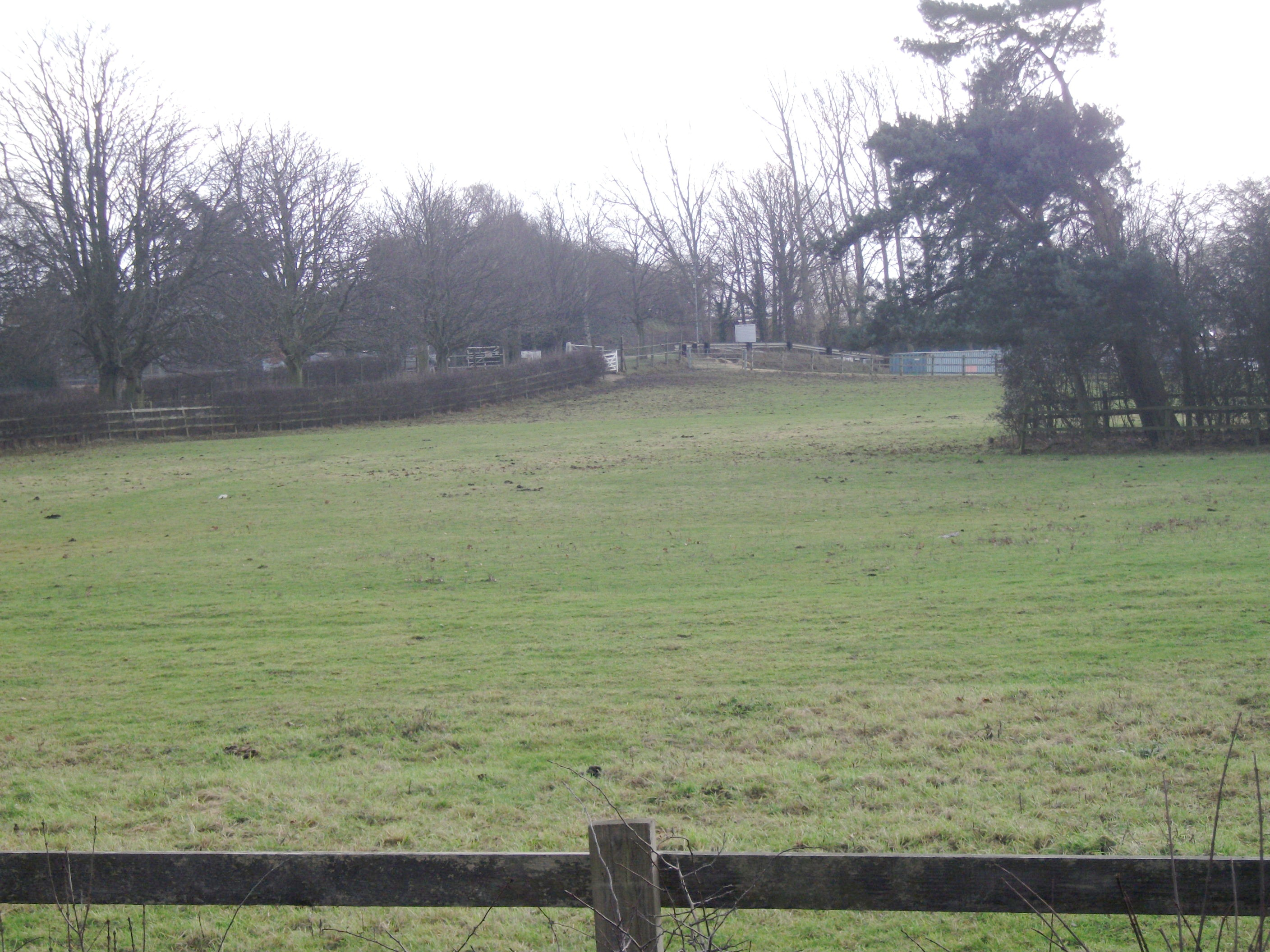
- Viewed from Goldington Road

Site information
- Type: Castle
- Condition: Earthworks

Location
- Shown within Bedfordshire
- Coordinates: 52.14568°N 0.40806°W

Risinghoe Castle, sometimes known as Goldington Castle, is a 20-foot (6.1 m) mound located in the Goldington area of Bedford, in the county of Bedfordshire, England. The mound is near to the north bank of the River Ouse three miles east of Bedford Castle and a mile west of Renhold Castle.

== Details ==
Controversy exists over the original purpose of the earthwork, particularly whether it was actually part of a castle site. Conventional wisdom states Risinghoe Castle was a timber Motte-and-bailey castle built sometime after the Norman Conquest of 1066. It is referred to as having been the property of Hugh de Beauchamp, the chief landowner in Goldington in 1086. The castle is mentioned as already being old by the end of the 12th century. It was probably obtained by Warden Abbey with the grange of Risinghoe and Puttenhoe Manor, with which it was conferred on Sir John Gostwick at the Dissolution of the Monasteries (1538–1541), afterwards passing, with the rest of their property in Goldington, to John Russell, Duke of Bedford.

There is no surviving physical evidence of a bailey, nor other elements of a castle, although this may be due to extensive clay extraction on the site in Victorian times. A number of authors have stated that the mound was excavated in 1943, however no primary sources for the excavation appear to exist, and there is no mention of it in the report of the 1943 annual meeting of the Bedfordshire Natural History and Archaeological Society. An alternative version, stated by local residents, is that the mound was penetrated for the construction of an air raid shelter in 1940 and nothing was found. If the second version of events is correct, then no professional excavation has ever taken place.

Beauchamp Wadmore, in his 1920 book The Earthworks of Bedfordshire, casts further doubts on the status as a castle site. Wadmore's researches point to the mound being erected to commemorate a 9th-century victory over the Danes associated with nearby Gannocks Castle. Wadmore also states that, prior to the damage of the site for clay extraction, a second smaller mound existed. However, an early Ordnance Survey map names it as a castle site.

Risinghoe Castle is located on private property belonging to a local company and is not open to the public. However, the site can be viewed from a distance from the nearby road.

== See also ==
- Castles in Great Britain and Ireland
- List of castles in England
