= Ravensden =

Village in Bedfordshire, England

Coordinates: 52.178151°N 0.425156°W

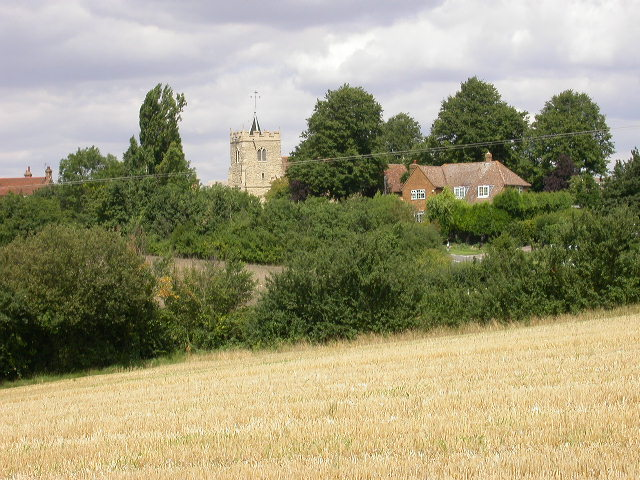
- All Saints Church at Ravensden.

- Location within Bedfordshire
- Population: 1,961 (2011 Census)
- OS grid reference: TL076705
- Unitary authority: Bedford
- Ceremonial county: Bedfordshire
- Region: East
- Country: England
- Sovereign state: United Kingdom
- Post town: BEDFORD
- Postcode district: MK44
- Dialling code: 01234
- Police: Bedfordshire
- Fire: Bedfordshire
- Ambulance: East of England
- UK Parliament: North Bedfordshire

Ravensden is a village and civil parish located in the Borough of Bedford in Bedfordshire, England.

The parish borders the town of Bedford, with Mowsbury Park, farmland and Freeman's Common acting as a buffer between the two settlements. The village hosts a primary school (Ravensden CofE Primary Academy), and a pub called The Horse and Jockey, as well as All Saints Church, dating to the 12th century. There is also a village hall.

For elections to Bedford Borough Council, Ravensden is part of Great Barford ward, and for national elections it is part of the North Bedfordshire parliamentary constituency.

A housing estate called Woodlands Park was established in the southern part of Ravensden parish in the late 2000s. The estate is separated from the village by farmland, with vehicular access to the community coming from the Brickhill area of Bedford. In April 2015 Woodlands Park became part of Brickhill parish, but remains part of Great Barford ward for elections to Bedford Borough Council

== Facilities ==
Pubs

The village is currently served by one pub, The Horse and Jockey, next to the Church. Three other pubs have closed; The Case Is Altered, on Church End, which closed in 1995 and is now in residential use; The Blacksmiths Arms, previously The Cross, which was situated at the crossroads, and which closed in the early 2000s; and The White Lion, which was opposite the site of The Blacksmiths Arms, until the two came under the same ownership in 1941, at which time the decision was taken to close the former and transfer its licence to the latter.

Schools

Ravensden (Church of England) Primary Academy is situated at Vicarage Close in the centre of the main village. The secondary school for which Ravensden is in catchment is Mark Rutherford School, in Putnoe.

Church

All Saints Church, Ravensden, is located at the very top of the hill in Ravensden, overlooking the lower parts of the village. The main building dates back to the 12th century, and is composed of limestone rubble, though the southern porch entrance and the chancel are assumed to be a 16th-century addition, and are composed of red brick.
