= Church of All Saints, Ravensden =

Church in Bedfordshire, England

Coordinates: 52.1766°N 0.4253°W

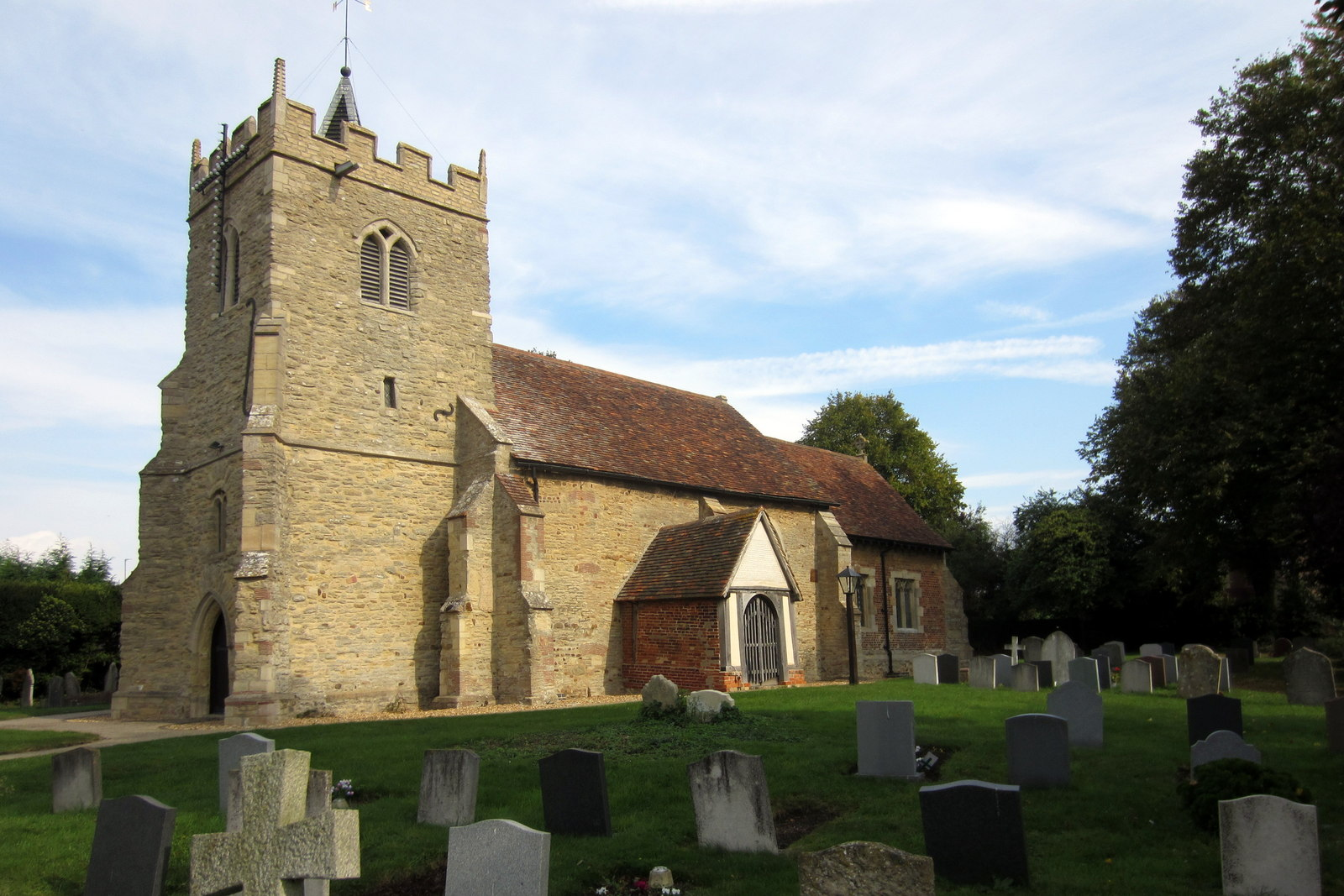

Church of All Saints is a Grade I listed church in Ravensden, Bedfordshire, England. It became a listed building on 13 July 1964.

== See also ==
- Grade I listed buildings in Bedfordshire
