= Lower Shelton =

Village in Bedfordshire, England

Coordinates: 52.0792°N 0.5496°W

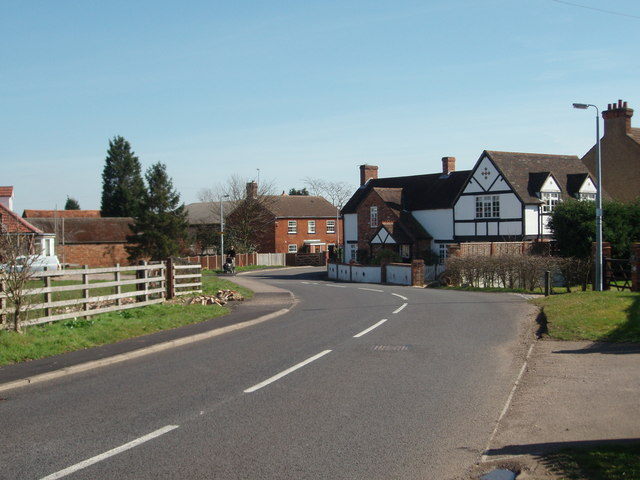
- Lower Shelton

- Location within Bedfordshire
- OS grid reference: SP994433
- Civil parish: Marston Moreteyne
- Unitary authority: Central Bedfordshire
- Ceremonial county: Bedfordshire
- Region: East
- Country: England
- Sovereign state: United Kingdom
- Post town: Bedford
- Postcode district: MK43
- Dialling code: 01234
- Police: Bedfordshire
- Fire: Bedfordshire and Luton
- Ambulance: East of England
- UK Parliament: Mid Bedfordshire

Lower Shelton is a village in the civil parish of Marston Moreteyne in Bedfordshire, England. It is made of Lower Shelton Road, Stratford Way, The Rickyard, Franklin Close and Chequers Close and another small close known locally as "The jetty" although there is no water in view. The area is made up of many sizes and types of houses of differing ages.

Shelton Manor is located halfway between the A421 and Upper Shelton and located close to the disused Shelton Farm. The road is in a rural setting between fields with views of Lidlington and the ancient church of Marston Moreteyne. Near the top the road is crossed by a high voltage power line from Toddington switching station.

The last main housing estate to be built within the village was The Rickyard, which was completed in 2005.
