= Renhold =

Village in Bedfordshire, England

Coordinates: 52.1640°N 0.4072°W

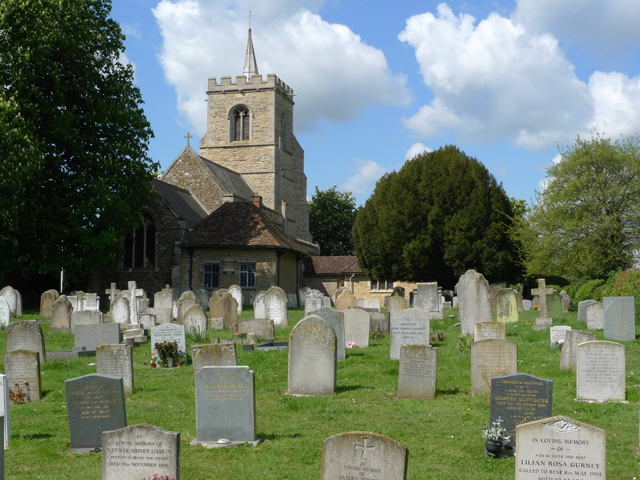
- All Saints Church, Renhold

- Location within Bedfordshire
- Population: 1,800 (2005 estimate); 2,451 (2011 Census)
- OS grid reference: TL089325
- Unitary authority: Bedford
- Ceremonial county: Bedfordshire
- Region: East
- Country: England
- Sovereign state: United Kingdom
- Post town: BEDFORD
- Postcode district: MK41
- Dialling code: 01234
- Police: Bedfordshire
- Fire: Bedfordshire
- Ambulance: East of England
- UK Parliament: North Bedfordshire

Renhold is a village and civil parish located on the River Ouse, in the Borough of Bedford, Bedfordshire, England. The parish church is situated some 4 miles (6.5 km) east-north-east of Bedford town centre. The former Bedfordshire County Council estimated the population of Renhold to be 1,800 in 2005, and forecast an increase to 2,320 by 2010.

The parish is made up of several hamlets ("Ends" in local parlance) including Salph End, Church End, Lane End, Top End, Workhouse End, and Water End. In the 2000s, two new housing estates were constructed on the southern boundary of Renhold parish. The Spires and Cranbourne Gardens estates have been established off Norse Road in Bedford, with vehicular access from the Goldington area of the town. The new estates remain part Renhold village for electoral purposes.

The parish is home to Renhold Chapel, All Saints Church at Church End (not to be confused with Church of All Saints, Ravensden), and the ruins of Renhold Castle. There is a country house called Howbury Hall in the southern part of the parish. It was rebuilt in 1849, and remains a private home.

== Notable people ==
- George Joyce (born c. 1492) Publisher of the first English Primer (1529) and the first English translation of Psalms (1530)

== Education ==
Renhold village is primarily served by Renhold V.C. Primary School and Mark Rutherford School to the south of the village. The Spires and Cranbourne Gardens estates fall into the catchment for both Putnoe Primary School and Renhold V.C. Primary School.
