= Goldington Academy =

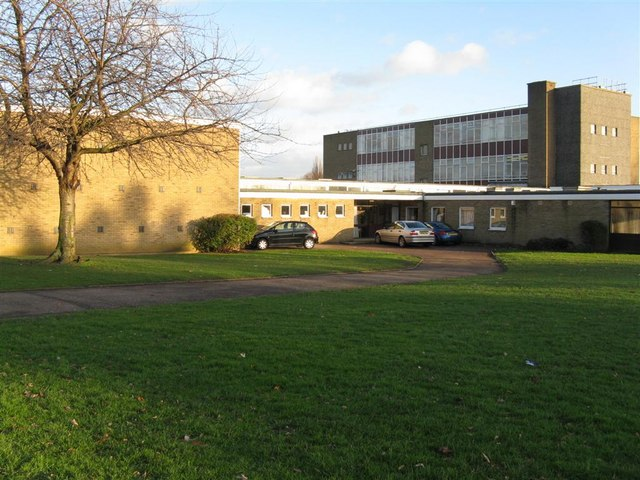

Location
- Haylands Ways; Bedford, Bedfordshire, MK41 9BX; England; 52.14471°N 0.44422°W

Information
- Type: Academy
- Established: 1965; 61 years ago
- Department for Education URN: 136552 Tables
- Ofsted: Reports
- Principal: Francis Galbraith
- Gender: Mixed
- Age: 11 to 16
- Enrollment: 940
- Capacity: 940
- Website: www.goldington.beds.sch.uk

Goldington Academy (formerly Goldington Middle School) is a mixed secondary school located in the Goldington/Putnoe area of Bedford, Bedfordshire, England.

== History ==
The school on Haylands Way was established in 1965, and was designated as Goldington Middle School in the early 1970s after Bedfordshire County Council decided to implement the three-tier education system of lower, middle and upper schools across the county (as recommended in the 1967 Plowden Report).

In the 2000s, the Goldington Middle School was inspected an Outstanding school (OfSTED April 2007) was awarded the Artsmark award and was also designated as a Beacon School.

Plans made by Bedford Borough Council to implement a two-tier education system in the Borough were withdrawn for most Bedford Borough schools following a decision by the coalition government in 2010 to cancel the Building Schools for the Future Project (BSF) and withdraw associated funding. Most of the closure notices that had been served on Bedford Borough middle schools were revoked in February 2011, including that for Goldington Middle School.

To protect the school from closure in the future the Governing Body, following consultation with stakeholders, decided to apply to the Secretary of State for Education to convert to an academy. This application was accepted and the school became Goldington Academy on 1 April 2011. The opening celebration assembly was attended by local MP, Richard Fuller.

As of September 2017, the school began the transformation from a middle school to a secondary school.

The school site was originally located in the Goldington area of Bedford, but boundary changes mean the school is now located just over the border in Putnoe
