= Chawston =

Hamlet in Bedfordshire, England

Coordinates: 52.19235°N 0.31499°W

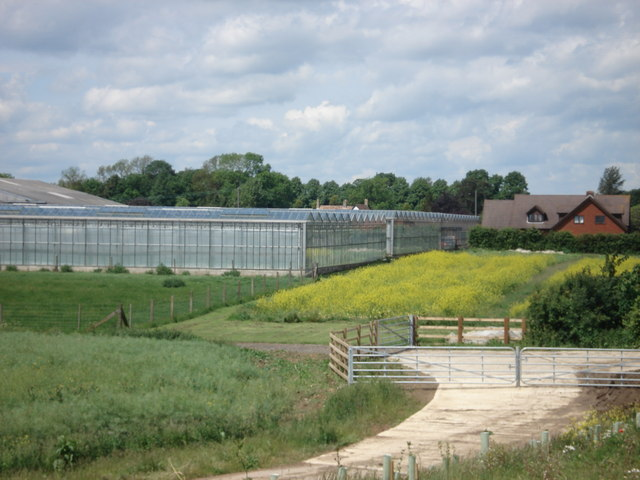
- Glasshouses near Roxton Road

- Location within Bedfordshire
- OS grid reference: TL152562
- Civil parish: Wyboston, Chawston and Colesden
- Unitary authority: Bedford
- Ceremonial county: Bedfordshire
- Region: East
- Country: England
- Sovereign state: United Kingdom
- Post town: BEDFORD
- Postcode district: MK44
- Dialling code: 01480
- Police: Bedfordshire
- Fire: Bedfordshire
- Ambulance: East of England
- UK Parliament: North Bedfordshire

Chawston is a hamlet in the civil parish of Wyboston, Chawston and Colesden, a part of the Borough of Bedford in the county of Bedfordshire, England.

Although mainly situated on the western side of the A1 trunk road, the settlement does have a number of residential properties on the eastern side.

Chawston is some 7.5 miles (12 km) northeast of Bedford and 3.5 miles (6 km) southwest of St Neots.

== History ==
Chawston was first recorded as a settlement in 1086 as part of the Domesday Book (it is actually recorded as Chauelestorne and Calnestorne).

The Chawston manor estate dates to 1186, though the current Chawston Manor House is a 17th-century Grade II listed building. A former M.P. for Bedfordshire, Robert Hunt, owned Chawston Manor in 1414. The manor passed to his son, Roger Hunt, who was Speaker of the House of Commons in 1421 and 1433. He also became baron of the Exchequer.

During the 1930s, much of Chawston was incorporated into the Land Settlement Association scheme (LSA). The scheme provided smallholdings of five acres in Chawston to unemployed miners from Kent and North East England. The new tenants of the land were required to sell any produce they grew through the LSA scheme. Approximately fifty years later, the LSA was abolished, and the properties in Chawston were sold on the open market, though some were secured by existing tenants. Many of the original LSA cottages have been extended and renovated since this time.

== Chawston today ==
Chawston is mainly residential. The nearest shops and local services are in the neighbouring village of Wyboston.
