= Wyboston =

Village in Bedfordshire, England

Coordinates: 52.195°N 0.299°W

- Location within Bedfordshire
- OS grid reference: TL158568
- Civil parish: Wyboston, Chawston and Colesden
- Unitary authority: Bedford
- Ceremonial county: Bedfordshire
- Region: East
- Country: England
- Sovereign state: United Kingdom
- Post town: BEDFORD
- Postcode district: MK44
- Dialling code: 01480
- Police: Bedfordshire
- Fire: Bedfordshire
- Ambulance: East of England
- UK Parliament: North Bedfordshire

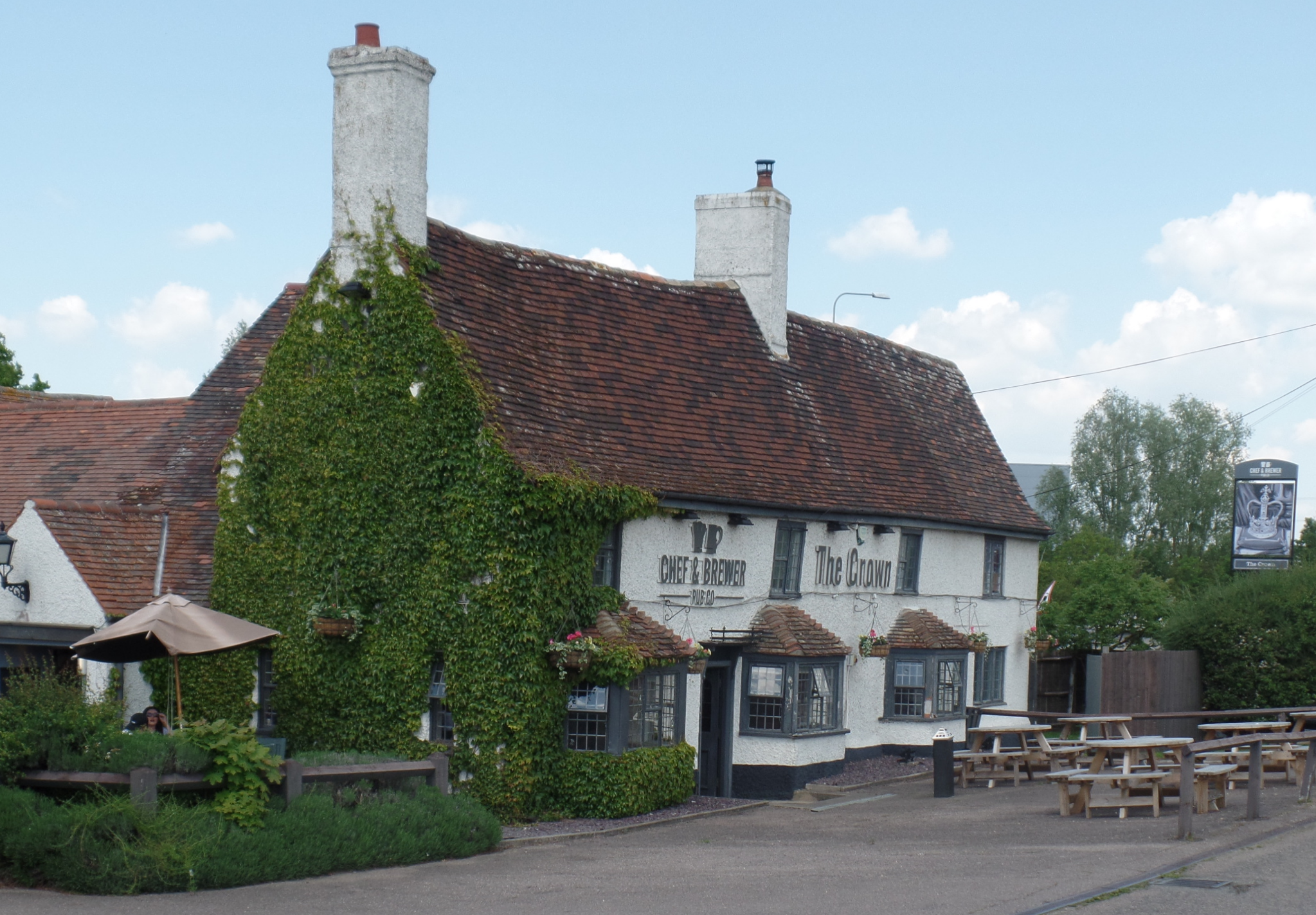
The Crown Inn, Wyboston

Wyboston is a village in the English county of Bedfordshire, close to the town of St Neots and the Cambridgeshire border. The eastern part of the village is dominated by the A1 Great North Road. Approaching the Black Cat roundabout from the Bedford direction, the parish boundary is in the centre of the A421 road. The northern junction of these roads is grade-separated.

Wyboston is in the civil parish of Wyboston, Chawston and Colesden.

The remainder of Wyboston is horticultural and agricultural as a result of the proximity of the River Great Ouse.

Wyboston Lakes Resort at the edge of the village includes a golf course, hotel, spa, serviced offices and conference and training facilities. Wyboston is also the location of a conference centre owned and operated by Cambridge University's Robinson College. There is a service station which includes a BP garage with a Londis shop attached, Subway and a 24-hour McDonald's.

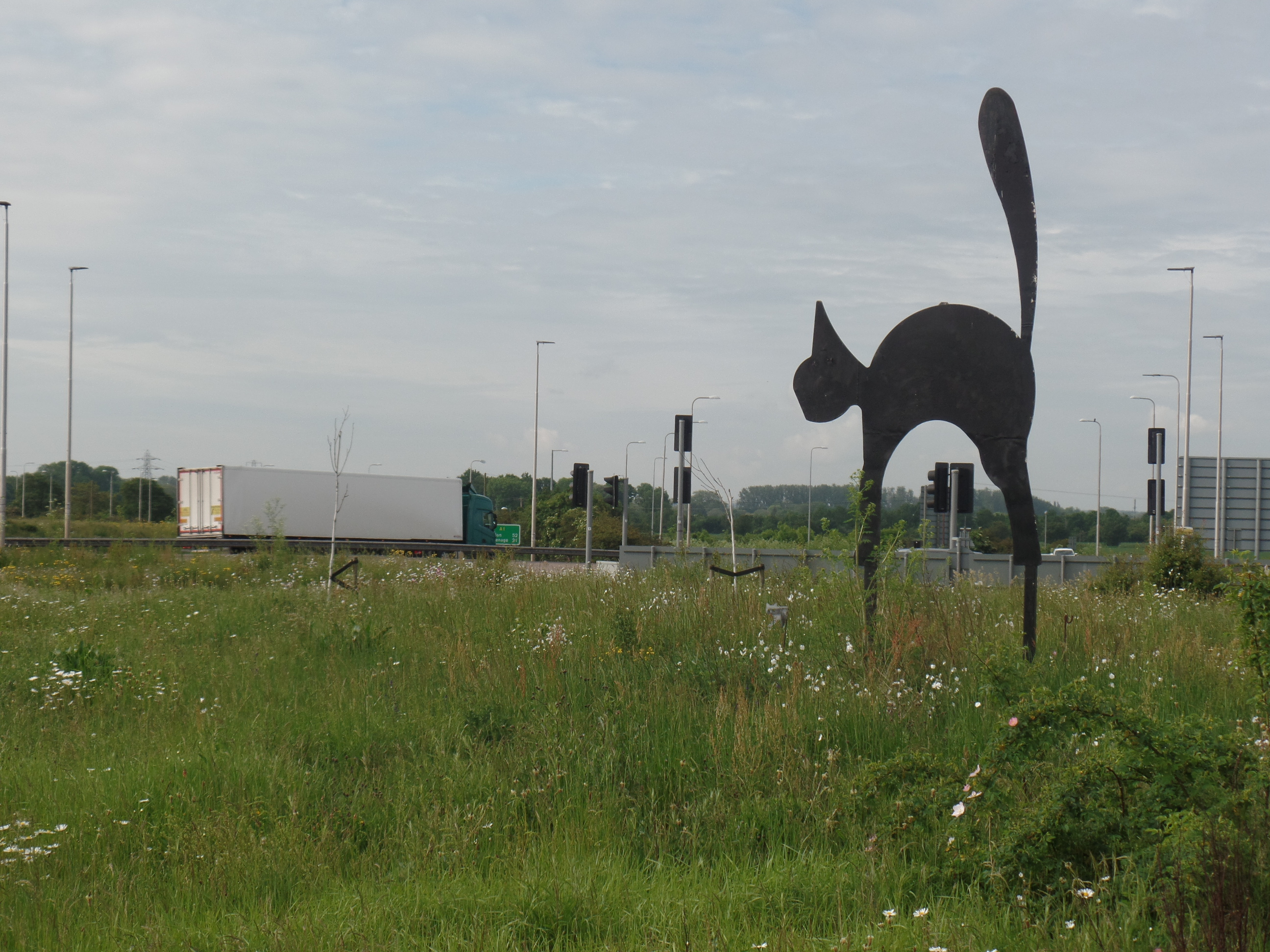
Black Cat roundabout on A1

Wyboston is the location of the Black Cat roundabout, where the Bedford Road joins the A1 road. In the 1930s the location was the site of a cafe and fuel station, and was a notable stopping point for motorists. The name stuck for the road junction, and when the road system was improved in 2010 a black cat artwork was erected on the roundabout.
