= Hundreds of Bedfordshire =

Administrative divisions of Bedfordshire County, England

- Administrative divisions
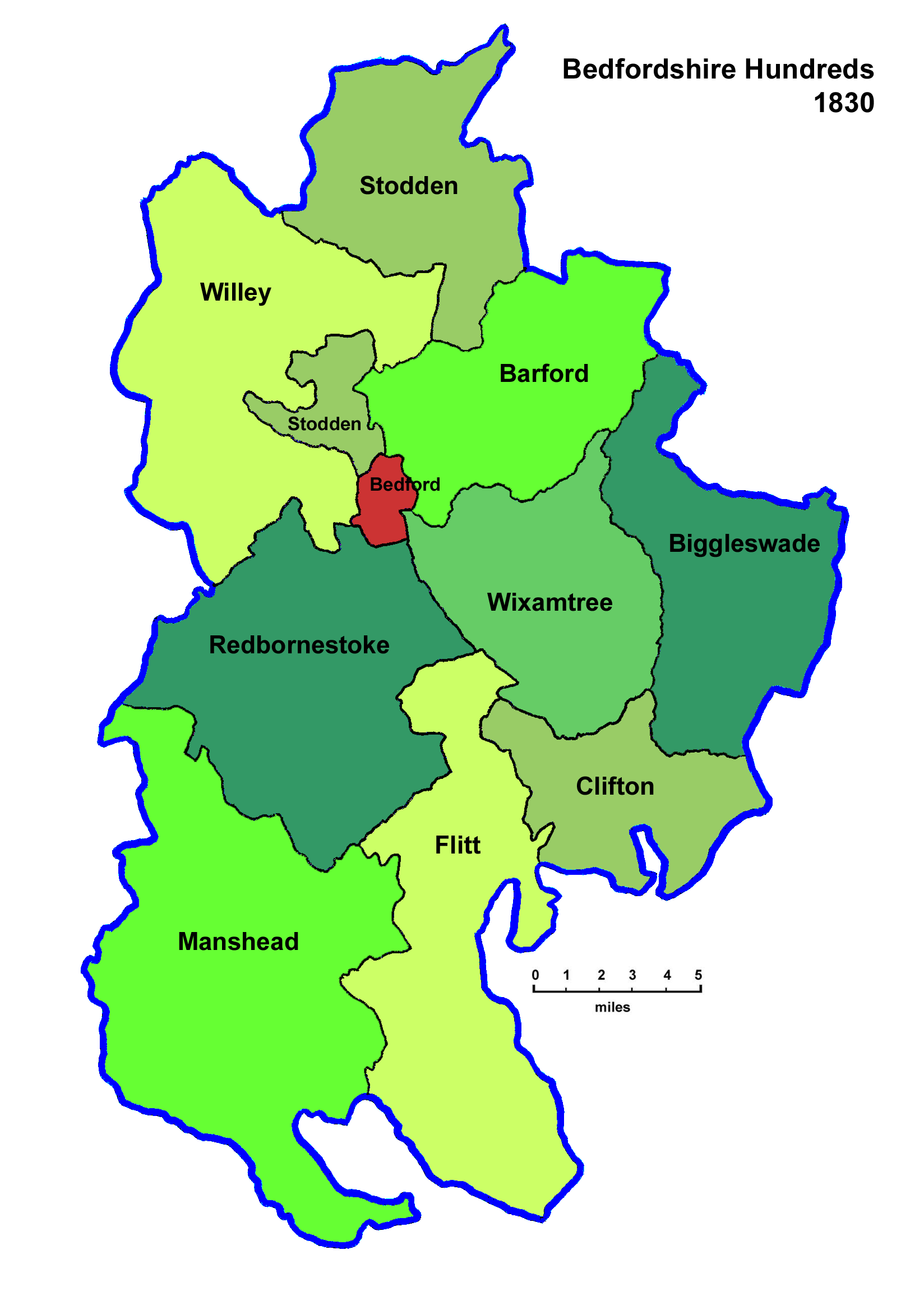
- The Hundreds of Bedfordshire in 1830
- Country: England
- Sovereign state: United Kingdom
- Hundreds: Barford, Biggleswade, Clifton, Flitt, Manshead, Redbornstoke, Stodden, Willey, Wixamtree

Between Anglo-Saxon times and the nineteenth century Bedfordshire was divided for administrative purposes into 9 hundreds, plus the borough of Bedford. Each hundred had a separate council that met each month to rule on local judicial and taxation matters.

The Domesday Survey of 1086 lists three additional half hundreds, Stanburge, Buchelai and Weneslai, which had by the 14th century become parts of the hundreds of Manshead, Willey and Biggleswade respectively.

Each hundred had a bailiff; the names of some bailiffs in 1349 were: Thomas Cammull, for Manshead, with Walter Sporoun, a former bailiff; John de Lynbotesshaye, for Flete; Edward atte Haye, for Redbournestok; Walter le Longe, for Wyley.

Until 1574 one sheriff covered Bedfordshire and Buckinghamshire, the shire court of the former being held at Bedford. The jurisdiction of the hundred courts, with the exception of Flitt, remained in the king's possession. Flitt was parcel of the manor of Luton, and formed part of the marriage portion of Eleanor, sister of Henry III and wife of William Marshall.

== Parishes ==
At the start of the 19th century, the hundreds contained the following parishes:

Hundred	Parishes
Barford	Great Barford, Colmworth, Eaton Socon, Goldington, Ravensden, Renhold, Roxton, Wilden
Biggleswade	Astwick, Little Barford, Biggleswade, Cockayne Hatley, Dunton, Edworth, Everton, Eyeworth, Langford, Potton, Sandy, Sutton, Tempsford, Wrestlingworth
Clifton	Arlesey, Campton, Clifton, Holwell, Meppershall, Shillington, Upper Stondon, Stotfold
Flitt	Barton in the Clay, Caddington, Clophill, Flitton, Flitwick, Lower Gravenhurst, Upper Gravenhurst, Haynes, Higham Gobion, Luton, Pulloxhill, Streatley, Sundon
Manshead	Aspley Guise, Battlesden, Chalgrave, Dunstable, Eaton Bray, Eversholt, Harlington, Hockliffe, Holcot, Houghton Regis, Husborne Crawley, Leighton Buzzard, Milton Bryan, Potsgrove, Salford, Studham, Tilsworth, Tingrith, Toddington, Totternhoe, Westoning, Whipsnade, Woburn
Redbornstoke	Ampthill, Cranfield, Elstow, Houghton Conquest, Kempston, Lidlington, Marston Moretaine, Maulden, Millbrook, Ridgmont, Steppingley, Wilshamstead, Wootton
Stodden	Bolnhurst, Clapham, Dean, Keysoe, Knotting, Melchbourne, Milton Ernest, Oakley, Pertenhall, Riseley, Shelton, Little Staughton, Tilbrook, Yielden
Willey	Biddenham, Bletsoe, Bromham, Carlton, Chellington, Farndish, Felmersham, Harrold, Odell, Pavenham, Podington, Sharnbrook, Souldrop, Stagsden, Stevington, Thurleigh, Turvey
Wixamtree	Blunham, Cardington, Cople, Northill, Southill, Old Warden, Willington,

Three of the parishes above were in fact historically part of Huntingdonshire until they were incorporated into Bedfordshire in the late 19th century, though each was considered part of a Bedfordshire hundred. Eaton Socon fell into Barford hundred, Everton in Biggleswade hundred, and Tilbrook in Stodden hundred.

== See also ==
- History of Bedfordshire
- List of hundreds of England and Wales
