= History of Bedfordshire =

History of Bedfordshire County in England

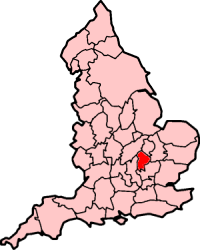
Ancient extent of Bedfordshire

Bedfordshire is an English ceremonial county which lies between approximately 25 miles and 55 miles (or approximately 40 and 90 kilometres) north of central London.

== Anglo-Saxon Bedfordshire ==
Early 5th century Saxon burial sites have been discovered at Kempston and Sandy, two Bedfordshire towns on the River Great Ouse and its tributary the River Ivel, as well as at Luton, in the south of the county on the River Lea (a tributary of the Thames). These sites are all in the vicinity of Roman towns, suggesting that these may have been the site of Saxon foederati employed by Romano-British inhabitants to protect their towns. A seventh century settlement at Stratton, near Biggleswade has also been found.

The area may have remained part of a British enclave until the Battle of Bedcanford (Bedford) in 571, when Cuthwulf inflicted a severe defeat on the Britons and took the towns of Eynsham, Aylesbury, Benson and Limbury. This area may have coincided with the "Chilternsetna" who comprised 4,000 hides in the Tribal Hidage (compared to 7,000 for Essex).

During the Heptarchy what is now Bedfordshire formed part of Mercia; by the Treaty of Wedmore it became part of the Danelaw.

The Vikings of Bedford were subdued by King Edward the Elder in 915, and he built two burhs at Bedford on each side of the River Ouse. Four hundreds were formed on each side to support each burgh - Willey, Stodden, Buckelow and Barford in the north and Redbornstoke, Wixamtree, Biggleswade and Clifton in the south. The boundary to the north largely coincides with the watershed between the Nene and Ouse rivers, presumed to also be the boundary between the land of the Vikings based at Bedford and Northampton; the western boundary aligns with the Newport Hundreds, similarly laid out to support the new burh at Newport Pagnell, and the eastern boundary with the hundreds of Huntingdon.

The first mention of the county comes in 1016 when King Canute "laid waste to the whole shire".

== Norman Bedfordshire ==
There was no organised resistance to William the Conqueror within Bedfordshire, though the Domesday Book survey reveals an almost complete substitution of Norman for English landholders.

Bedfordshire suffered severely in the civil war of King Stephen's reign; the great Roll of the Exchequer of 1165 proves the shire receipts had depreciated in value to two-thirds of the assessment for the Danegeld. Again the county was thrown into the First Barons' War when Bedford Castle, seized from the Beauchamps by Falkes de Breauté one of the royal partisans, was the scene of three sieges before being demolished on the king's order in 1224 . The Peasants Revolt (1377–1381) was marked by less violence in Bedfordshire than in neighbouring counties; the Annals of Dunstable make brief mention of a rising in that town and the demand for and granting of a charter.

A large part of the county was subject to forest law as a royal forest, until 1191.

In 1638 ship money was levied on Bedfordshire, and in the English Civil War that followed, the county was one of the foremost in opposing the king. Clarendon observed that here Charles I had no visible party or fixed quarter.

The earliest original parliamentary writ that has been discovered was issued in 1290 when two members were returned for the county. In 1295 in addition to the county members, writs are found for two members to represent Bedford borough. Subsequently, until modern times two county and two borough members were returned regularly.

== Sub county level administration ==
=== Before 1835 ===
Bedfordshire was divided into nine hundreds, Barford, Biggleswade, Clifton, Flitt, Manshead, Redbornestoke, Stodden, Willey and Wixamtree, and the liberty, half hundred or borough of Bedford. From the Domesday survey it appears that in the 11th century there were three additional half hundreds, viz. Stanburge, Buchelai and Weneslai, which had by the 14th century become parts of the hundreds of Manshead, Willey and Biggleswade respectively.

Until 1574 one sheriff did duty for Bedfordshire and Buckinghamshire, the shire court of the former being held at Bedford. The jurisdiction of the hundred courts, excepting Flitt, remained in the king's possession. Flitt was parcel of the manor of Luton, and formed part of the marriage portion of Eleanor, sister of Henry III, and wife of William Marshall. The burgesses of Bedford and the prior of Dunstable claimed jurisdictional freedom in those two boroughs. The hundred Rolls and the Placita de quo warranto show that important jurisdiction had accrued to the great over-lordships, such as those of Beauchamp, Wahull and Caynho, and to several religious houses, the prior of St John of Jerusalem claiming rights in more than fifty places in the county.

=== 1835–1894 ===
Following the Poor Law Amendment Act 1834 the county was divided into poor law unions, each consisting of a town and surrounding rural parishes. The poor law unions based in Bedfordshire towns were Ampthill, Bedford, Biggleswade, Leighton Buzzard, Luton, and Woburn. In addition, a handful of parishes near the boundaries of Bedfordshire were included in poor law unions based in towns in other counties, namely Hitchin in Hertfordshire, St Neots in Huntingdonshire and Wellingborough in Northamptonshire.

Urban areas

Bedford was the only ancient borough in the county still operating at the time of the Municipal Corporations Act 1835. Dunstable was incorporated as a municipal borough in 1864 and Luton in 1876.

Urban local government in Bedfordshire in this period took one of three forms:

- Municipal Boroughs created under the Municipal Corporations Act 1835;
- Local Board Districts created under the Public Health Act 1848 and governed by a local board of health; or
- Local Government Districts created under the Local Government Act 1858 and governed by a local board.

Under the Public Health Acts of 1872 and 1875 these areas also became urban sanitary districts, with their existing council or board acting as urban sanitary authority.

Town	Type	Formed	Area covered	Notes
Ampthill	Local Government District	18 February 1893	Parish of Ampthill	
Bedford	Municipal Borough	1 January 1836	Bedford ancient borough	
Biggleswade	Local Government District	22 February 1892	Parish of Biggleswade	
Dunstable	Local Government District	19 May 1863	Parish of Dunstable	Abolished on creation of Dunstable Municipal Borough.
Dunstable	Municipal Borough	8 December 1864	Parish of Dunstable	
Leighton Buzzard	Local Government District	7 July 1891	Part of parish of Leighton Buzzard	
Luton	Local Board District	19 June 1850	Part of parish of Luton	Abolished on creation of Luton Municipal Borough.
Luton	Municipal Borough	25 February 1876	Part of parish of Luton	

Rural areas

Until 1872, local government in rural areas was limited to the parish vestries. As well as giving sanitary responsibilities to the urban authorities above, the Public Health Acts of 1872 and 1875 also established rural sanitary districts for the areas of each poor law union outside the urban authorities. These rural sanitary districts were administered by the existing boards of guardians for the poor law unions.

Rural Sanitary District	Notes	Area covered within Bedfordshire
Ampthill		
Bedford		
Biggleswade		
Hitchin	Mostly in Hertfordshire	Holwell
Leighton Buzzard	Part in Buckinghamshire	
Luton	Part in Hertfordshire	
St Neots	Mostly in Huntingdonshire	Dean, Eaton Socon, Little Barford, Little Staughton, Pertenhall, Shelton, Tilbrook
Wellingborough	Mostly in Northamptonshire	Podington, Wymington
Woburn		

=== 1894–1974 ===
The Local Government Act 1894 replaced the system of sanitary districts with urban and rural districts, each with an elected council. The urban districts, rural districts and municipal boroughs were collectively termed county districts and formed the principal subdivisions for local government for the next eighty years. Where sanitary districts had straddled county boundaries they were split or otherwise boundaries were adjusted so that each county district was solely in one county. Some of the adjustments to boundaries took a couple of years to finalise after the 1894 act, so there were some short-lived anomalies where districts initially straddled county boundaries, but these were all resolved for Bedfordshire by 1897.

District	From	To	Formed from	Successor	Notes
Ampthill Rural District	1894	1974	Ampthill Rural Sanitary District	Mid Bedfordshire	
Ampthill Urban District	1894	1974	Ampthill Urban Sanitary District	Mid Bedfordshire	
Bedford Municipal Borough	1894	1974	Bedford Municipal Borough (pre-existing authority continuing)	Bedford	
Bedford Rural District	1894	1974	Bedford Rural Sanitary District; Wellingborough Rural Sanitary District within Bedfordshire	Bedford	
Biggleswade Rural District	1894	1974	Biggleswade Rural Sanitary District	Mid Bedfordshire	
Biggleswade Urban District	1894	1974	Biggleswade Urban Sanitary District	Mid Bedfordshire	
Dunstable Municipal Borough	1894	1974	Dunstable Municipal Borough (pre-existing authority continuing)	South Bedfordshire	
Eaton Bray Rural District	1894	1933	Leighton Buzzard Rural Sanitary District within Bedfordshire	Luton Rural District	
Eaton Socon Rural District	1894	1934	St Neots Rural Sanitary District within Bedfordshire	Bedford Rural District	Included parish of Swineshead which was in Huntingdonshire until transferred to Bedfordshire in 1896.
Hitchin Rural District	1894	1897	Hitchin Rural Sanitary District		District in Hertfordshire, except initially included parish of Holwell which was in Bedfordshire until transferred to Hertfordshire in 1897.
Kempston Urban District	1896	1974	Part of Bedford Rural District	Bedford	
Leighton Buzzard Urban District	1894	1965	Leighton Buzzard Urban Sanitary District	Leighton-Linslade Urban District	
Leighton-Linslade Urban District	1965	1974	Leighton Buzzard Urban District and Linslade Urban District from Buckinghamshire	South Bedfordshire	
Luton Municipal Borough	1894	1964	Luton Municipal Borough (pre-existing authority continuing)	Luton County Borough	
Luton County Borough	1964	1974	Luton Municipal Borough	Luton	County Borough independent of Bedfordshire County Council although still within the county for ceremonial purposes.
Luton Rural District	1894	1974	Luton Rural Sanitary District	South Bedfordshire	
Sandy Urban District	1927	1974	Part of Biggleswade Rural District	Mid Bedfordshire	
St Neots Rural District	1894	1896	St Neots Rural Sanitary District		District in Huntingdonshire, except initially included parish of Tilbrook which was in Bedfordshire until transferred to Huntingdonshire in 1896.
Woburn Rural District	1894	1900	Woburn Rural Sanitary District	Ampthill Rural District	

=== 1974–2009 ===
The Local Government Act 1972 replaced the system of urban and rural district councils with a two-tier system of metropolitan and non-metropolitan county and district councils.

County council (principal authority)

- Bedfordshire

Borough and district councils

- Bedford district (renamed North Bedfordshire Borough in 1975, changed name again to Bedford Borough in 1992)
- Luton Borough
- Mid Bedfordshire district
- South Bedfordshire district

In 1997 Luton became a unitary authority, meaning the borough became administratively independent of Bedfordshire County Council. Luton remained part of Bedfordshire for ceremonial purposes.

=== Since 2009 ===
In 2006 the Department for Communities and Local Government (DCLG) considered reorganising Bedfordshire's administrative structure as part of the 2009 structural changes to local government in England. The four proposals considered were:

- Proposal 1, To abolish the three districts within the county to create a "Bedfordshire unitary authority". (Luton would remain a separate unitary authority.)
- Proposal 2, To create two unitary authorities: one based on the existing Bedford Borough, and the other, to be known as "Central Bedfordshire", a combination of Mid Bedfordshire and South Bedfordshire Districts. (Luton would remain a separate unitary authority.)
- Proposal 3, To create two unitary authorities: one a combination of Bedford Borough and Mid Bedfordshire District, and one a combination of Luton Borough and South Bedfordshire District.
- Proposal 4, To form an "enhanced two-tier" authority, with the four local councils under the control of the county council, but with different responsibilities.

On 6 March 2008 the DCLG decided to implement Proposal 2. Bedfordshire County Council initially challenged this decision in the High Court, but on 4 April 2008 it was announced the Judicial Review in the High Court had been unsuccessful, and the County Council declared they would not be appealing the decision.

Unitary authorities

- Bedford Borough
- Central Bedfordshire
- Luton Borough

Bedfordshire County Council was formally abolished on 1 April 2009, with its powers transferred to the new unitary authorities. the three authority areas continue to form the ceremonial county of Bedfordshire for functions such as lieutenancy and High Sheriff.

== Industry and agriculture ==
Owing to its favorable agricultural conditions, up until at least the late nineteenth century Bedfordshire was predominantly an agricultural rather than a manufacturing county. From the 13th to the 15th century sheep farming flourished, Bedfordshire wool being in demand and plentiful. Surviving records show that in assessments of wool to the king, Bedfordshire always provided its full quota. Tradition says that the straw-plait industry owes its introduction to James I, who transferred to Luton the colony of Lorraine plaiters whom Mary, Queen of Scots, had settled in Scotland.

Bedfordshire was one of the main centres of the English lace industry from the 16th century to the start of the 20th century, although early records are sparse and assertions of the role of Huguenot refugees in the industry are unsupported by evidence. In the early 18th century Daniel Defoe's A tour thro’ the whole island of Great Britain refers to the extent and quality of Bedfordshire lace manufacture, and the Northampton Militia Lists of 1777 document the number of lacemakers in different parts of the county at that time.

== Prominent landed families ==
Woburn Abbey, belonging to the Russells since 1547, is the seat of the Dukes of Bedford, the greatest landowner in the county. The Burgoynes of Sutton, whose baronetcy dates from 1641, have been in Bedfordshire since the 15th century, while the Osborn family have owned Chicksands Priory since its purchase by Peter Osborn in 1576. Sir Phillip Monoux Payne represents the ancient Morioux family of Wootton. Other county families are the Crawleys of Stockwood near Luton, the Brandreths of Houghton Regis, and the Orlebars of Hinwick.

== Ecclesiastical history ==
On the division of the Mercian diocese in 679 Bedfordshire was allocated to the new see of Dorchester. It formed part of the Diocese of Lincoln from 1075 until 1837, when it was transferred to the Diocese of Ely. In 1914 the Archdeaconry of Bedford, virtually corresponding to the county, was transferred to the Diocese of St Albans. In 1291 Bedfordshire was an archdeaconry including six rural deaneries, which remained practically unaltered until 1880, when they were increased to eleven with a new schedule of parishes.

== Antiquities and architecture ==
The monastic remains in Bedfordshire include the fine fragment of the church of the Augustinian priory at Dunstable, serving as the parish church; Elstow Abbey near Bedford, which belonged to a Benedictine nunnery founded by Judith, niece of William the Conqueror in 1078; and portions of the Gilbertine Chicksands Priory and of a Cistercian foundation at Old Warden. In the parish churches, many of which are of great interest, the predominant styles are Decorated and Perpendicular. Work of pre-Conquest date, however, is found in the massive tower of Clapham church, the tower of St. Peter's Church in Bedford town centre, and in a door of St Mary the Virgin in Stevington. Fine Norman and Early English work is seen at Dunstable and Elstow, and the later style is illustrated by the large cruciform churches at Leighton Buzzard and at Felmersham on the Ouse above Bedford. Among the perpendicular additions to the church last named may be noted a very beautiful oaken rood screen. To illustrate Decorated and Perpendicular the churches of Clifton and of Marston Moretaine, with its massive detached bell tower, may be mentioned; and Cople church is a good specimen of fine Perpendicular work. The church of Cockayne Hatley, near Potton, is fitted with rich Flemish carved wood, mostly from the abbey of Alne near Charleroi, and dating from 1689, but brought here by a former rector early in the 19th century. In medieval domestic architecture the county is not rich. The mansion of Woburn Abbey dates mainly from the middle of the 18th century in its present form.

== See also ==
- List of lost settlements in the United Kingdom#Bedfordshire
