= Cilternsæte =

Tribe from Chilterns

The Cilternsæte (or Chiltern Sætna) were a tribe that occupied the Chilterns, probably in the 6th century AD.

It is unclear whether the Cilternsæte were native Britons or Germanic-speaking newcomers such as Angles or Saxons. Mortimer Wheeler noted the absence of earliest phase Anglo-Saxon evidence from the Chilterns and suggested the area was a Brittonic (or Romano-British) enclave into the 6th century—possibly the remnants of a sub-Roman polity encompassing an area that included London, Colchester, and St Albans. Kenneth Rutherford-Davis would later expand on Wheeler's Romano-British remnant, linking it to the shadowy territory known as Calchfynydd, Welsh for "lime mountain". Eilert Ekwall suggested that "Chiltern" might be cognate with the ethnic name "Celt", such as the adjective celto- "high". Earlier, J. Brownbill had suggested the Cilternsæte were a branch of the West Saxons. Other sources claim that they were originally a Middle Angle tribe.

There is some circumstantial evidence linking four towns supposedly captured from Britons in 571 by a Saxon or Anglian leader named Cuthwulf to the Cilternsæte. The Anglo-Saxon Chronicle states "Her Cuþwulf feaht wiþ Bretwalas æt Bedcan forda. & .iiii. tunas genom, Lygeanburg. & Ægelesburg. Benningtun. & Egonesham. & þy ilcan geare he gefor" ("This year Cuthwulf fought with the Britons at Bedford and took four tuns, Limbury, Aylesbury, Benson and Eynsham. And this same year he died"). (An Anglo-Saxon tun "town" included significant surrounding countryside.) While Cuthwulf and his battles may be retrospective constructions, the Tribal Hidage (7th to 9th century) described the territory of the Cilternsæte as comprising 4,000 hides. This assessment is relatively large, compared to those of some other tribes of central England. In the Burghal Hidage (10th century) 4,000 hides are also recorded for the three burhs of Oxford, Buckingham and Sashes, corresponding to the tuns of Limbury, Aylesbury, Benson and Eynsham.

The Cilternsæte were definitely part of Mercia in the 7th century.
