= John Berridge =

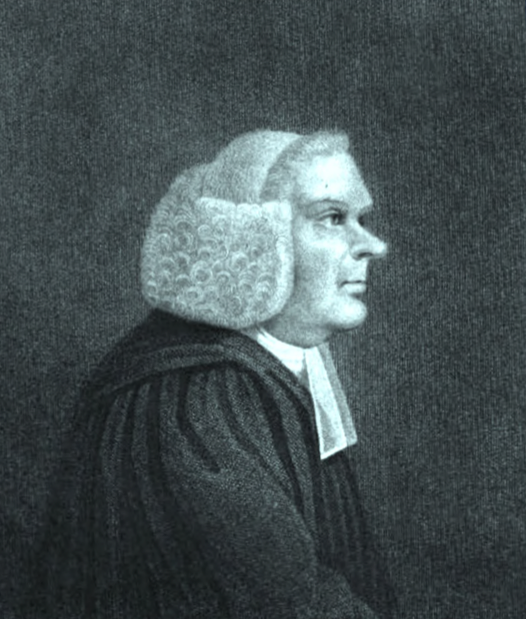
Portrait of Rev. John Berridge

John Berridge (1 March 1716 − 22 January 1793) was an Anglican evangelical revivalist and hymnist. J. C. Ryle wrote that as one of "the English evangelists of the eighteenth century" Berridge was "a mighty instrument for good."

== Early life ==
John Berridge was born in Kingston on Soar, Nottinghamshire, on 1 March 1716. His father (also John Berridge) was a wealthy farmer and grazier at Kingston, who married a Miss Sarah Hathwaite, in the year 1714. Berridge was his eldest son; he had three brothers.

At age fourteen, Berridge returned home. His father's plan was for Berridge to learn how to operate the family farm.

Knowledge of his "fallen state"
Berridge wrote in the epitaph on his tomb his stages of religious development. The first stage was "Remained ignorant of my fallen state till 1730". This stage referred to the fact that at age fourteen, Berridge came to believe that "he was a sinner, and must be born again".

Cambridge
Berridge's father sent him to Cambridge. He matriculated in 1735 where he entered Clare College on 12 June. He graduated BA in 1739 and MA in 1742. Berridge was elected an Exeter Fellow of his college in 1740, then as a Diggons fellow in 1743. Berridge became a foundation fellow in 1748. This allowed him to live in Clare College until 1757. Thus, he lived there throughout his first curacy in Stapleford and for two years into his vicarship at Everton. He gave up his fellowship on 1 June 1764.

Berridge had a "reputation in the University as a thorough scholar".

== Ordained ministry ==
Berridge was ordained Deacon in the Church of England on 10 March 1744 and Priest on 9 June 1745. He served from 1750 as Curate of Stapleford, Cambridgeshire (with Tetworth, Huntingdonshire) 1750-1755 and Vicar of Everton, Bedfordshire and Tetworth, Huntingdonshire 1755–93, that is until his death.

=== Curate of Stapleford, 1750-1755 ===
From 1750 to 1755, Berridge served as curate in Stapleford near Cambridge, riding out from Clare College.

He performed his duties with "a sincere desire to do good". He preached and taught "the importance of sanctification". Yet, as Berridge later reflected, his ministry in Stapleford was fruitless because he neither believed nor preached the gospel of justification by faith. Because he believed that he was having "no beneficial effect, spiritual or moral" on his congregation, he resigned.

=== Vicar of Everton, 1755-93 ===
On 1 July 1755, Berridge became Vicar of Everton, near Sandy. During the time Berridge continued to live in Clare College, he employed John Jones (1700–1770), a liberal clergyman, as resident curate. A "domestic disagreement" led to Jones resigning. This episode may explain "the degree and nature of Jones's adverse comments on Berridge's character" both then and later.

Of his ministry in Everton, Berridge later wrote that, for the first two years, he again preached "sanctification and regeneration as vigorously" as he could and again without success. Berridge also reflected that he blamed his lack of success on his hearers rather than on the wrong doctrine he was preaching. Preaching sanctification with the gospel of justification by faith was the second phase of Berridge's religious development that he wrote on the epitaph on his tomb, namely, "Lived proudly on faith and works for salvation till 1754".

Conversion
About Christmas 1757, Berridge began thinking that he might be preaching wrong doctrine. He was "musing upon a text of Scripture" when what seemed to him "like a voice from heaven" said, "Cease from thine own works." By this epiphany, he realized that his former belief that his salvation depended partly through his works, and "partly through Christ’s mercies" was wrong. Now he was assured that his salvation depended solely on Christ's mercies, to wit, that he was "justified by faith" and that "sanctification follows after justification".

Berridge does not specify what text of Scripture on which he was musing, but it might well have been Hebrews 4:10 in conjunction with Matthew Poole’s Annotations Upon the Holy Bible (1700). Poole comments that "true Christians have ceased and rested from all their sinful works and labours,"

Berridge's conversion was the third in his three stages of religious development that he wrote in the epitaph on his tomb, namely, "Fled to Jesus alone for refuge, 1756".

Changed preaching After his conversion to "the true way to salvation," Berridge began to preach it. As he wrote, during his eight years of preaching "sanctification," he "never brought one soul to Christ". But, now, people began to flock "from all parts to hear the glorious sound of the gospel. People not only came to Everton to hear Berridge, by 1759 he itinerated in nearby villages "preaching effectively to country people in field and barn". In his itinerant preaching, he covered the counties of Bedford, Cambridge, Essex, Hertford, and Huntingdon.

Although Berridge sometimes preached in Whitefield's Tabernacle, Tottenham Court Road, London, for the most part he confined his preaching to "his own district" where he had "more than enough to do".

Curious physical effects of Berridge's preaching "At times Berridge's preaching produced "very curious physical effects". Some hearers "cried out aloud hysterically, some were thrown into strong convulsions, and some fell into a kind of trance". However, Berridge "never encouraged these demonstrations, and certainly did not regard them as a necessary mark of conversion."

Health problems Berridge suffered from asthma. After nine years of doing constant itinerant preaching, from 1768 to 1773 he was too unwell to itinerate. Also due to his unwellness, "congregations at Everton began to dwindle". However, a combination of Berridge's improved health and the appointment in 1782 of Richard Whittingham as his curate, the congregations enlarged again.

Opposition Berridge faced opposition throughout his ministry. Most of the opposition came from "the unconverted clergy of Bedfordshire, Huntingdonshire, and Cambridgeshire" where Berridge itinerated. They were jealous of Berridge because people gathered "in gigantic throngs" to hear him preach.

== Last days, death, and burial ==
Unlike some Methodists, Berridge never married, and lived alone. He had no relatives or connections within traveling distance.

Not only was Berridge not married, he advocated clerical celibacy giving as his biblical authority Jeremiah 16:2 in which God told Jeremiah, a fellow-preacher, "you must not marry and have sons or daughters in this place."

In January 1793, Berridge became unable to travel and suffered a terminal asthmatic illness. He died in his vicarage in Everton on 22 January. Charles Simeon of Cambridge preached the funeral sermon on 27 January in Everton churchyard. "An immense concourse of people assembled from all parts of the country" for the funeral. Six clergymen acted as pallbearers.

== Reputation ==
J. C. Ryle wrote in 1867 that "of all the English evangelists of the eighteenth century [Berridge was] above all, . . . a mighty instrument for good." "There were few greater, better, holier, and more useful ministers a hundred years ago than old John Berridge."

John Wesley commended Berridge "as one of the most simple as well as most sensible of all whom it pleased God to employ in reviving primitive Christianity."

Charles Spurgeon included John Berridge on his list of Eccentric Preachers along with Hugh Latimer, Hugh Peters, Daniel Burgess, Rowland Hill, Matthew Wilks, William Dawson, Jacob Gruber, Edward Taylor, Edward Brooke, and Billy Bray. Berridge was not only on Spurgeon's list, but Spurgeon reckoned Berridge to be the "chief" of the eccentric preachers. "What a lump of quaintness that man was," Spurgeon said, but "what a power he was to stir the souls of men and lead them to the Saviour’s feet".

== Works ==
Berridge's works were numerous and included the following. Notes about the various works are taken from The Dictionary of National Biography, Volume 2 (1908).

1. A Collection of Divine Songs (1760), mostly from Wesley's hymns, a volume which he afterwards suppressed, substituting for it Sion's Songs(1785 and 1815). Republished in a New Edition in 1842 and included in R. Whittingham, ed., The Works of John Berridge, with an Enlarged Memoir of his Life (1838).
2. Justification by Faith Alone: being the substance of a letter from the Rev. Mr. Berridge in Cambridge to a clergyman in Nottinghamshire, giving an account of a great work of God wrought in his own heart (a letter written from Everton July 3, 1758, and first published in 1762). Also in The Works of the Rev. John Berridge (1838), 349–364. The letter was also reproduced in 1794 under the title of "A Short Account of the Life and Conversion of Rev. John Berridge," and in 1827 and 1836 as "The Great Error Detected, or Self-righteousness Disclaimed."
3. The Christian World Unmasked, Pray Come and Peep (1773), an expression of Berridge's religious belief, which passed through many editions, and was answered by John William Fletcher in the first and second parts of his Five Checks to Antinomianism. The Rev. Richard Whittingham, who had been Berridge's curate at Everton, added a short memoir of his life to a reprint of The Christian World Unmasked about 1818.
4. Cheerful Piety, or Religion without Gloom: Exemplified in Select Letters on the Most Important Truths of Christianity (1792). A selection of Berridge's letters.
5. Last Farewell Sermon, preached at the Tabernacle, near Moorfields, April 1, 1792 in The Works of John Berridge, A.M. (1838), 140-158.
6. Gospel Gems: a Collection of Notes from the Margins of the Bible of John Berridge, Vicar of Everton, 1755–1793 (1882).
7. Observations on Passages of Scripture in The Works of John Berridge, A.M. (1838), 159-182.
8. Critical notes in an 1891 edition of Bogatsky's Golden Treasury as noted in a review of the edition in The Academy, Volume 40, on page 581.
9. Numerous anecdotes, as well as letters from him, are contained in the ‘Life and Times of the Countess of Huntingdon,’ and in the Congregational Magazine for 1841 and 1845.

The Life and Times of Selina, Countess of Huntingdon, Volume 1 and The Life and Times of Selina, Countess of Huntingdon, Volume 2
The Congregational Magazine, Volume 5 (1841) and The Congregational Magazine, Volume 9 (1845)
