= Edworth =

Hamlet in Bedfordshire, England

Coordinates: 52.0514°N 0.2194°W

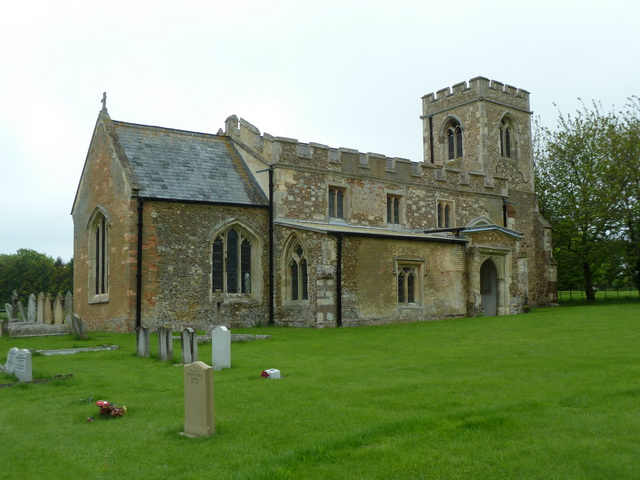
- St George's parish church

- Location within Bedfordshire
- Unitary authority: Central Bedfordshire
- Ceremonial county: Bedfordshire
- Region: East
- Country: England
- Sovereign state: United Kingdom
- Post town: biggleswade
- Postcode district: SG18
- Police: Bedfordshire
- Fire: Bedfordshire
- Ambulance: East of England

Edworth is a hamlet and civil parish in the Central Bedfordshire district of the county of Bedfordshire, England about 12 miles (19 km) south-east of the county town of Bedford. It sits just off the Great North Road (A1) between Baldock and Biggleswade. There are fewer than one hundred inhabitants. At the 2011 Census, Edworth's population was amalgamated with the civil parish of Dunton.

== Geography ==
Edworth lies 3 miles (5 km) south-east of Biggleswade and 17.5 miles (28 km) south-west of Cambridge. The eastern parish boundary borders Hertfordshire.

The hamlet is 45 metres (148 ft) above sea level. The land falls to 32 metres (105 ft) in the north-east corner of the parish. The highest point is the A1 road near Topler's Hill at 69 metres (226 ft).

The majority of the parish is arable farmland. The centre, north and west of the parish lie on boulder clay. The remainder is largely gault. The whole parish has highly fertile lime-rich loamy and clayey soils with slightly impeded drainage.

== Parish church ==
St. George's Church has not been used for worship since 1974. It is cared for by the Churches Conservation Trust. Building started around 1200. Highlights include medieval glass, a rare pillar piscina, traces of fourteenth-century wall paintings, a decorated font and fifteenth-century choirstalls carved with animals. There is a ring of three bells, the oldest of which dates to 1480.

== Governance ==
Due to its small size, Edworth has a parish meeting rather than a parish council. Edworth is part of Potton ward for elections to the Central Bedfordshire Unitary Authority.

Prior to 1894, Edworth was administered as part of the Hundred of Biggleswade. From 1894 until 1974 the village was in Biggleswade Rural District and from 1974 to 2009 in Mid Bedfordshire District.

== Public services ==
Edworth is in the Potton Public Water Supply Zone (RW50). The water supplied by Anglian Water comes from groundwater boreholes and is chloraminated and classed as hard.

The Eastern Power Area of UK Power Networks is the distribution network operator for electricity. There is no mains gas supply.

The two nearest general hospitals are Bedford (Bedford Hospital NHS Trust) and Lister Hospital, Stevenage (East and North Hertfordshire NHS Trust). Ambulance services are provided by the East of England Ambulance Service NHS Trust. Bedfordshire Fire and Rescue Service and Bedfordshire Police cover the parish.

The nearest public library is at Biggleswade.

== Public transport ==
No bus services run through the village.

The nearest railway station is Biggleswade.

== Amenities ==
Hinxworth and Edworth Village Hall is in the nearby village of Hinxworth.
