= Battle of Bedcanford =

Battle in Britain in 571

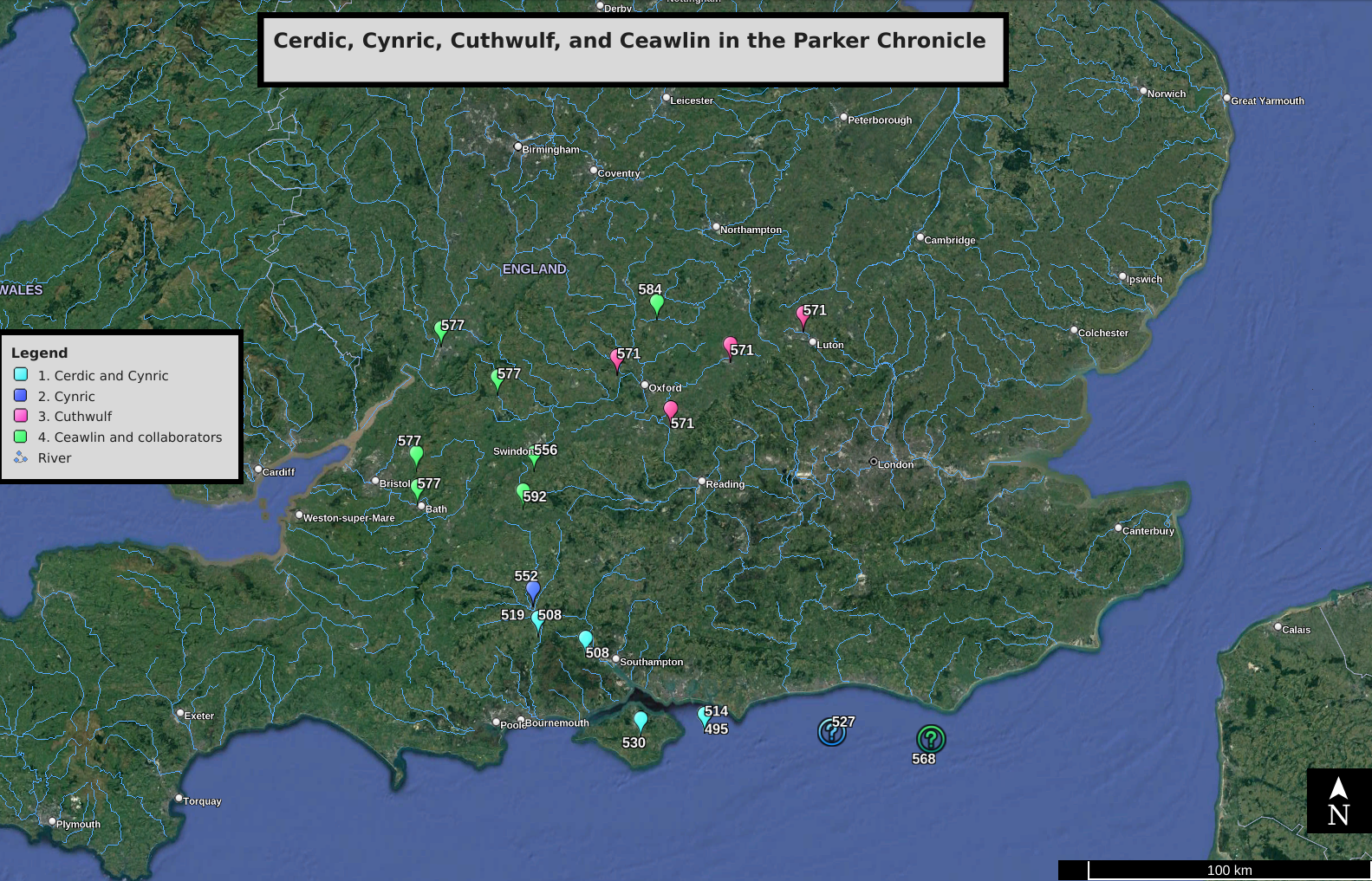
Sixth- and seventh-century battles of West-Saxon kings according to the Anglo-Saxon Chronicle

The Battle of Bedcanford is a battle portrayed in the Anglo-Saxon Chronicle as taking place in 571 between Britons and someone called Cuthwulf (normally assumed to be a West Saxon).

== Portrayal in the Chronicle ==
The annal describing the battle reads "Her Cuþwulf feaht wiþ Bretwalas æt Bedcan forda. & .iiii. tunas genom, Lygeanburg. & Ægelesburg. Benningtun. & Egonesham. & þy ilcan geare he gefor" ("This year Cuthwulf fought with the Britons at Bedford and took four towns, Limbury, Aylesbury, Benson and Eynsham. And this same year he died").

== Identification of Bedcanford ==
The identity of Badcanford is uncertain. Traditionally it was assumed the name was an early variant of Bedford. Although the first recorded version of Bedford was Bedanford, its identification as Bedcanford has been declared unlikely by several modern historians, usually without offering any alternative location. One who did offer an alternative location was former Australian Prime Minister Billy Hughes, proposing Berkhamsted in 1927.

== Historicity ==
In an influential lecture of 1849 on "The Early English Settlements in South Britain", Edwin Guest took the Anglo-Saxon Chronicle account of sixth- and seventh-century battles between Anglo-Saxons and the Britons as a historically accurate and coherent account of an Anglo-Saxon military invasion, followed by settlement, northwards from the south coast of Britain. The Battle of Bedcanford was for many years viewed by historians as part of this history. In 1881, John Richard Green's Guest-inspired The Making of England claimed that Cuthwulf was the son of Cynric, portrayed by the Chronicle as the founder of the West-Saxon dynasty, and argued that the four towns controlled the north bank of the Thames river from the Chilterns to the Cotswolds—roughly coinciding with the traditional counties of Buckinghamshire and Oxfordshire. As archaeological evidence grew more extensive during the twentieth century and historians came to view the whole of south-eastern Britain as being culturally Anglo-Saxon already in the fifth century, they attempted to fit the annal into their understanding by positing that the area had come under Anglo-Saxon rule, been lost again following a resurgence in British power around 500, and reconquered in 571.

This consensus was prominently questioned in 1983 by Patrick Sims-Williams, who argued that the Chronicle account could not be relied on as a true account of sixth-century events, and that it could rather reflect later inventions intended to support later political and territorial claims by the West-Saxon kings. He argued that when it referred to Limbury, Aylesbury, Benson and Eynsham by the Old English word tūnas (translated above as "towns"), the Chronicle was using the word in the technical sense of "royal manor", and he advanced evidence that each site was indeed a royal manor during the early Middle Ages. This does not in itself disprove that the sites were captured in 571, but does give a plausible reason why later West Saxon kings may also have wished to promote the idea that they held them by right of conquest. Moreover, Sims-Williams noted good evidence that Mercia had significantly expanded its territory southwards into West-Saxon lands by winning the Battle of Bensington in 779, leading to territorial disputes concerning church lands that King Offa of Mercia had taken in the process. Sims-Williams suggested that these territorial gains included formerly West-Saxon royal estates at Limbury, Aylesbury, Benson and Eynsham and that "without asserting that the 571 annal was simply invented to form a 'charter' for West Saxon territorial aspirations, it may nevertheless be suggested that it may have been shaped by the events of 779 and after".

It is possible that the Cilternsæte or Chiltern-setna, a tribe of 4,000-hides listed in the Tribal Hidage, comprised the territory of these four towns: the 4,000 hides for the Chilternsetna in the Tribal Hidage matches the 4,000 for the three burhs of Oxford, Buckingham and Sashes in the Burghal Hidage from about 100 years later.
