= Eyeworth =

Village in Bedfordshire, England

Coordinates: 52.09459°N 0.1787°W

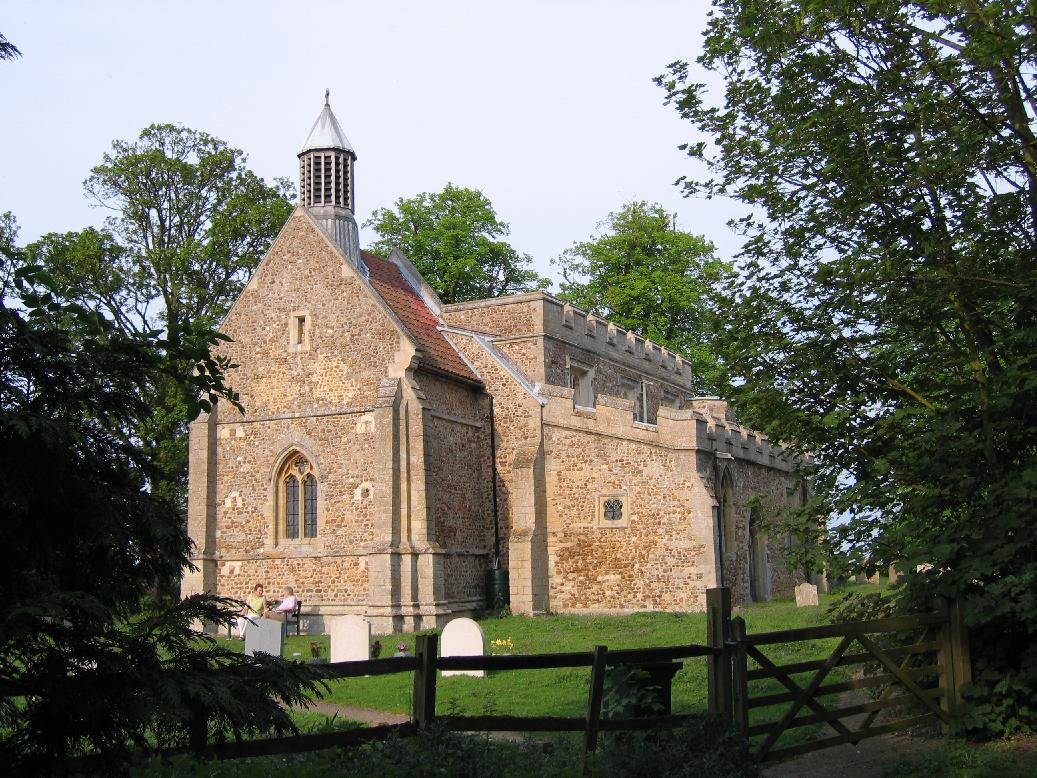
- All Saints‘ Church, Eyeworth

- Location within Bedfordshire
- OS grid reference: TL248455
- Unitary authority: Central Bedfordshire
- Ceremonial county: Bedfordshire
- Region: East
- Country: England
- Sovereign state: United Kingdom
- Post town: SANDY
- Postcode district: SG19
- Dialling code: 01767
- Police: Bedfordshire
- Fire: Bedfordshire
- Ambulance: East of England
- UK Parliament: North Bedfordshire

Eyeworth (also Eyworth) is a small, rural village and civil parish in the Central Bedfordshire district of the county of Bedfordshire, England; about 12.5 miles (20 km) east south-east of the county town of Bedford.

Eyeworth had a population of 86 in 2001.

== Geography ==
Eyeworth lies 4 miles (6 km) east of Biggleswade and 15 miles (24 km) south-west of Cambridge. The eastern parish boundary borders both Hertfordshire and Cambridgeshire at the River Rhee.

=== Landscape ===
Natural England has designated the area as part of The Bedfordshire and Cambridgeshire Claylands (NCA 88). Central Bedfordshire Council has classified the landscape as Dunton Clay Vale (5G). Most of the parish is open, arable farmland with medium to large fields. Eyeworth lies on a ridge of land that forms part of the watershed between the River Ivel to the west and the Rhee to the east. Tributary streams and drainage channels run through the area. Field boundaries are primarily short flailed, gappy hedges. The limited woodland creates a very open landscape. Occasional mature hedgerow trees and roadside oaks on grass verges are a feature.

=== Elevation ===
The village centre is 50 metres (164 ft) above sea level and is the highest point in the parish. The land falls away quite sharply to 30 metres (98 ft) in the east but more gradually to the west and north.

=== Geology and soil type ===
The centre and west of the parish lie on boulder clay; with gault to the east. The whole parish has lime-rich loamy and clayey soils with slightly impeded drainage.

== History ==
The name is spelt Aieuuorde and Aisseuuorde in the Domesday Book. Eyeworth may mean 'island farm'. The majority of the houses are Victorian, though the seventeenth century Church Farm remains.

The widow of Francis Bacon, née Alice Barnham, lived in Eyeworth following his death, and she died there in 1650. There were a number of minor skirmishes in the parish during the Civil War and it is reputed that Oliver Cromwell visited the village and damaged some of the church's icons.

== Population ==
Population growth in Eyeworth since 1801
Year	Pop.	±%
1801	86	—
1841	128	+48.8%
1881	170	+32.8%
1921	120	−29.4%
1961	89	−25.8%
2001	86	−3.4%
2021	371	+331.4%

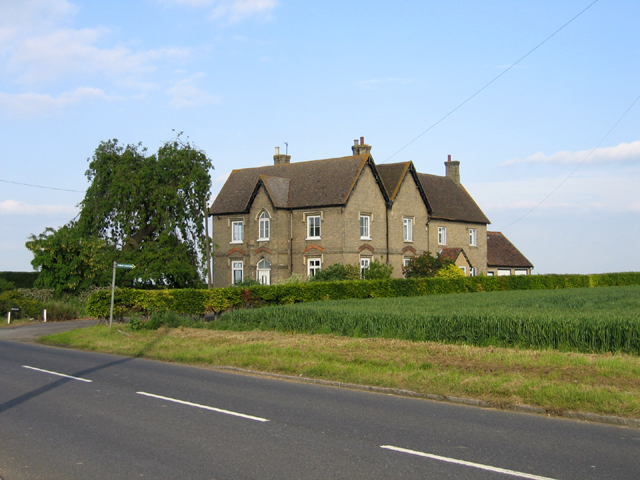
Manor Farm House

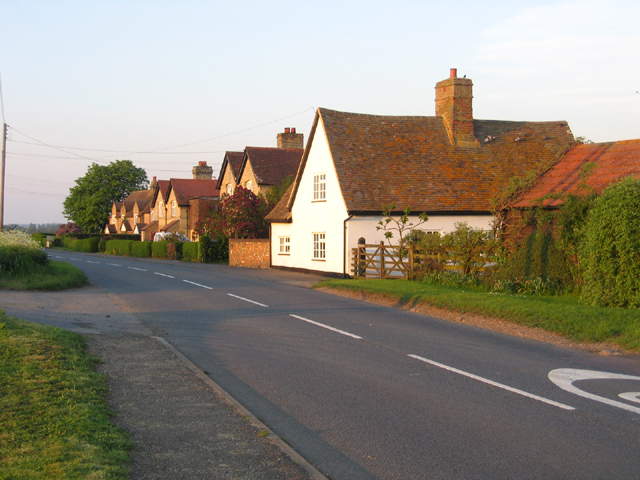
Cottages, Eyeworth

== Governance ==
Eyeworth is part of Potton ward for elections to the Central Bedfordshire Unitary Authority.

Prior to 1894, Eyeworth was administered as part of the Hundred of Biggleswade.From 1894 until 1974 the village was in Biggleswade Rural District and from 1974 to 2009 in Mid Bedfordshire District.

Eyeworth was in the Mid Bedfordshire parliamentary constituency until 1997, North East Bedfordshire until 2023 and from 2024 in North Bedfordshire.

== All Saints' Church ==
The village is home to a medieval church dedicated to All Saints whose building dates back to the fourteenth century, and is partly constructed from Totternhoe stone. The church's fifteenth-century spire was destroyed by lightning in 1967, and after the subsequent theft of the lead from its roof was replaced by a much smaller modern turret.

The interior houses a number of medieval brasses and a monument to Sir Edmund Anderson (d.1605), founder of the Anderson line who were lords of the manor, and who was also a judge during the trial of Mary, Queen of Scots.

== Public services ==
Eyeworth is in the Potton Public Water Supply Zone (RW50). The water supplied by Anglian Water comes from groundwater boreholes and is chloraminated and classed as hard.

The Eastern Power Area of UK Power Networks is the distribution network operator for electricity. There is no natural gas supply.

The two nearest general hospitals are Bedford (Bedford Hospital NHS Trust) and Lister Hospital, Stevenage (East and North Hertfordshire NHS Trust). Ambulance services are provided by the East of England Ambulance Service NHS Trust. Bedfordshire Fire and Rescue Service and Bedfordshire Police cover the parish.

Potton is the nearest library.

== Public transport ==
Grant Palmer runs bus route no. 72 to Biggleswade and via Wrestlingworth, Potton and Sandy to Bedford.

The nearest railway station is Biggleswade.

== Notable residents ==
Notable residents include Sir Peter Kendall, ex President of the National Farmers Union, who farms the land around the village with his brother Richard.
