= St George's Church, Edworth =

Coordinates: 52.0510°N 0.2190°W

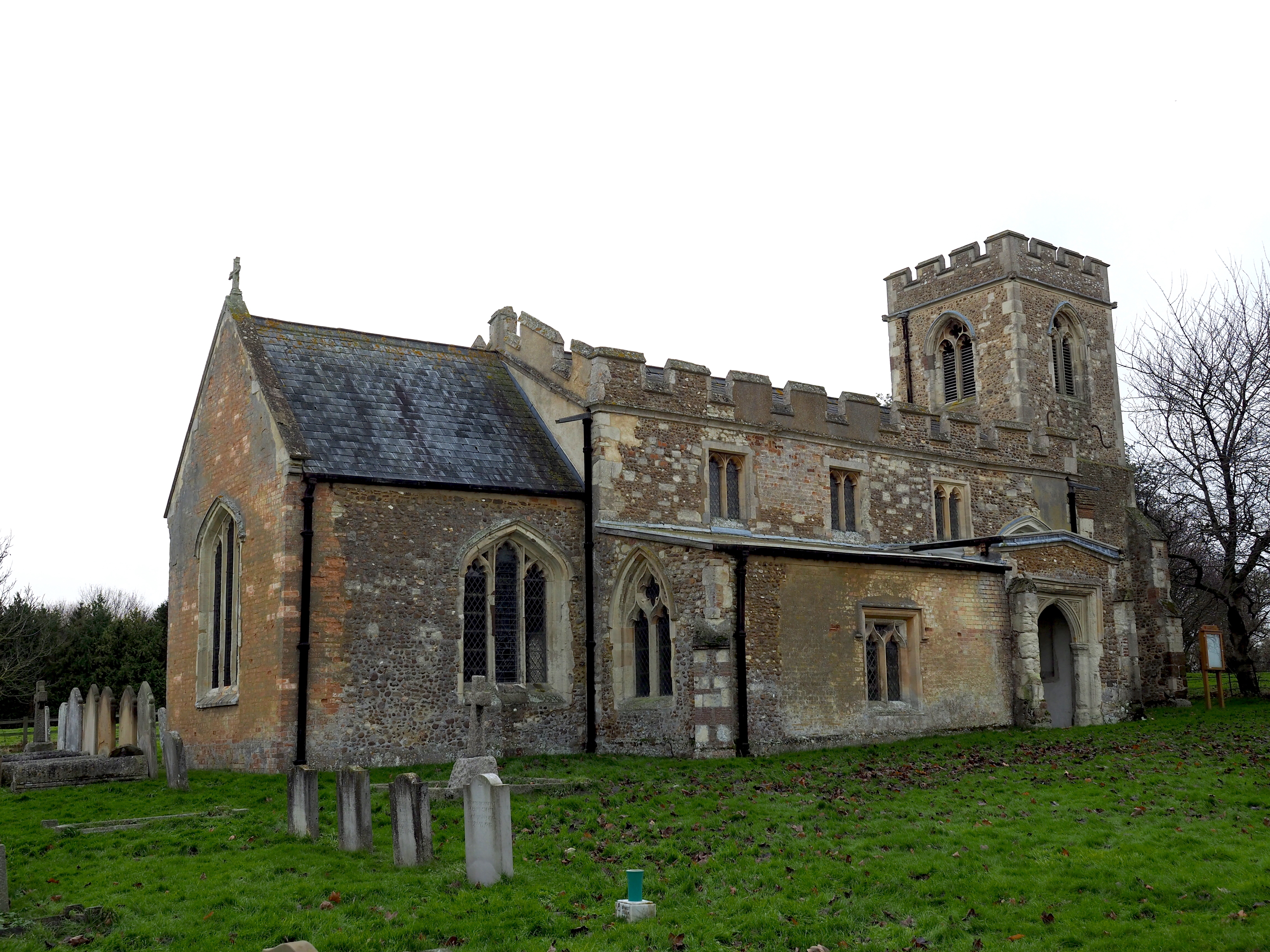
- St George's Church, Edworth, from the southeast

- Location in Bedfordshire
- OS grid reference: TL 222 407
- Location: Edworth, Bedfordshire
- Country: England
- Denomination: Anglican

History
- Dedication: Saint George

Architecture
- Functional status: Redundant
- Heritage designation: Grade I
- Designated: 31 October 1966
- Architectural type: Church
- Style: Gothic
- Closed: 1972

Specifications
- Materials: Cobblestones, ironstone and limestone Roofs slated

St. George's Church, Edworth, is a redundant Anglican church in the village of Edworth, Bedfordshire, England. It is recorded in the National Heritage List for England as a designated Grade I listed building and is under the care of the Churches Conservation Trust. Edworth is about 3 miles (5 km) southeast of Biggleswade, to the east of the A1 road.

== History ==
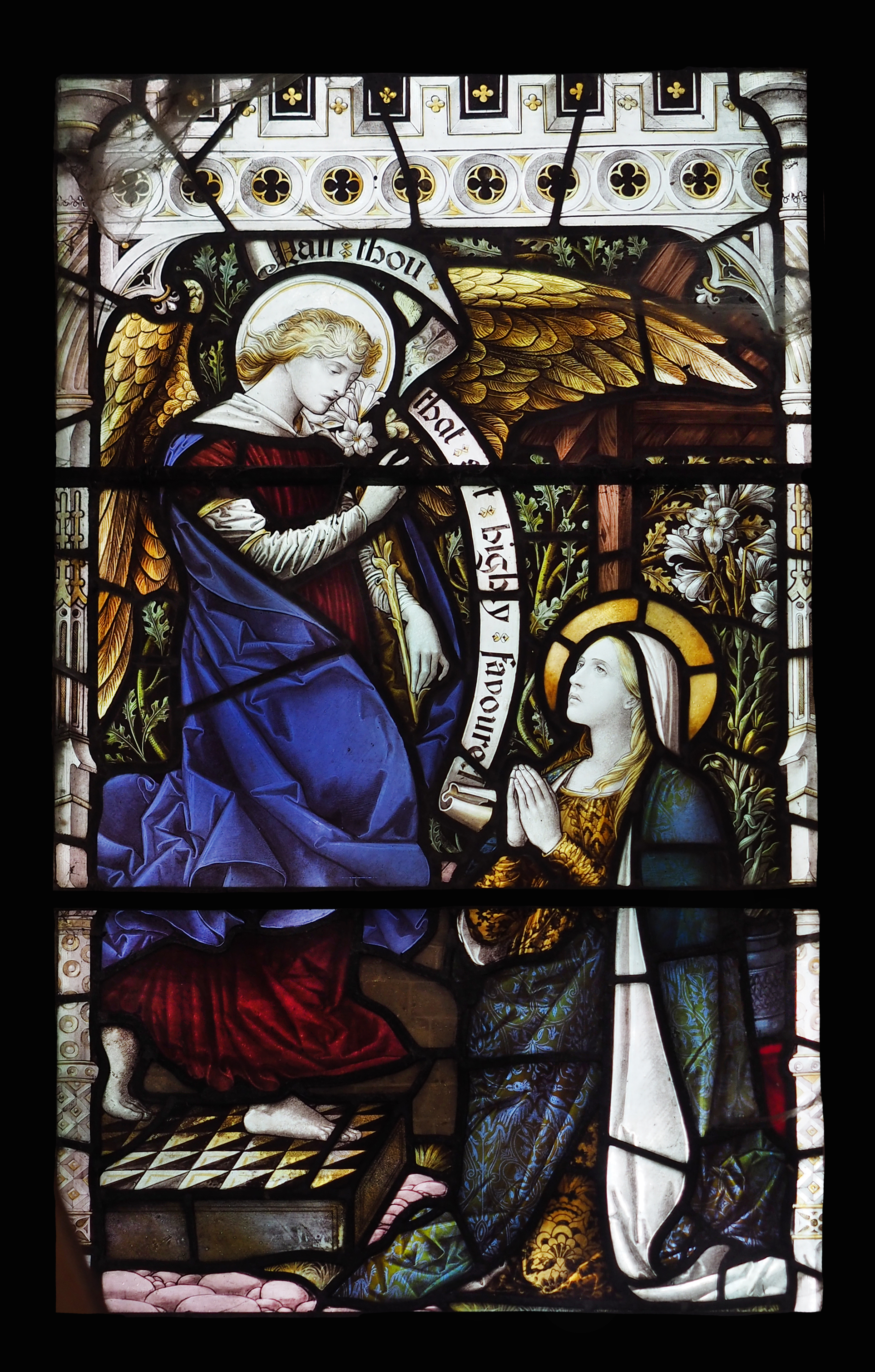
West window, St George's Church, Edworth by Shrigley & Hunt (1892)

The church dates from about 1200 and during the Middle Ages belonged to St. Neots Priory. In about 1320, the aisles were added, and the chancel was rebuilt. The tower dates from the middle of the 14th century, and the porches were added during the later part of the 15th century. The chancel was shortened in the 19th century. The church was declared redundant on 1 June 1974 and was vested in the Churches Conservation Trust on 9 June 1976.

== Architecture ==
=== Exterior ===
St. George's is constructed in a mixture of cobblestones, ironstone, and limestone with ashlar dressings, and has rendering applied to parts of the walls. The roofs are slated. Its plan consists of a two-bay nave with a clerestory, north and south aisles, north and south porches, a chancel, and a west tower. The tower dates from the 14th century. It is in two stages, with angle buttresses and an embattled parapet. On the west side, the lower stage contains a single-light window. The bell openings in the upper stage have two lights. The three-light east window in the chancel was inserted in the 19th century and is in 15th-century style. In both the north and south walls of the chancel are three-light 15th-century windows, and in addition there is a blocked 14th-century south doorway. In the nave, on both sides to the west of the porch, is a 15th-century three-light window. The clerestory has three two-light square-headed windows on each side. Both doorways date from the 14th century. In the north aisle are two-light windows in the east and north walls. The south aisle has a 14th-century two-light east window. In its south wall is a three-light 15th-century window and a small single-light window. The porches both date from the 15th century, and are similar in style with shallow gables. In the south porch is a two-light west window; the corresponding window in the north porch is blocked.

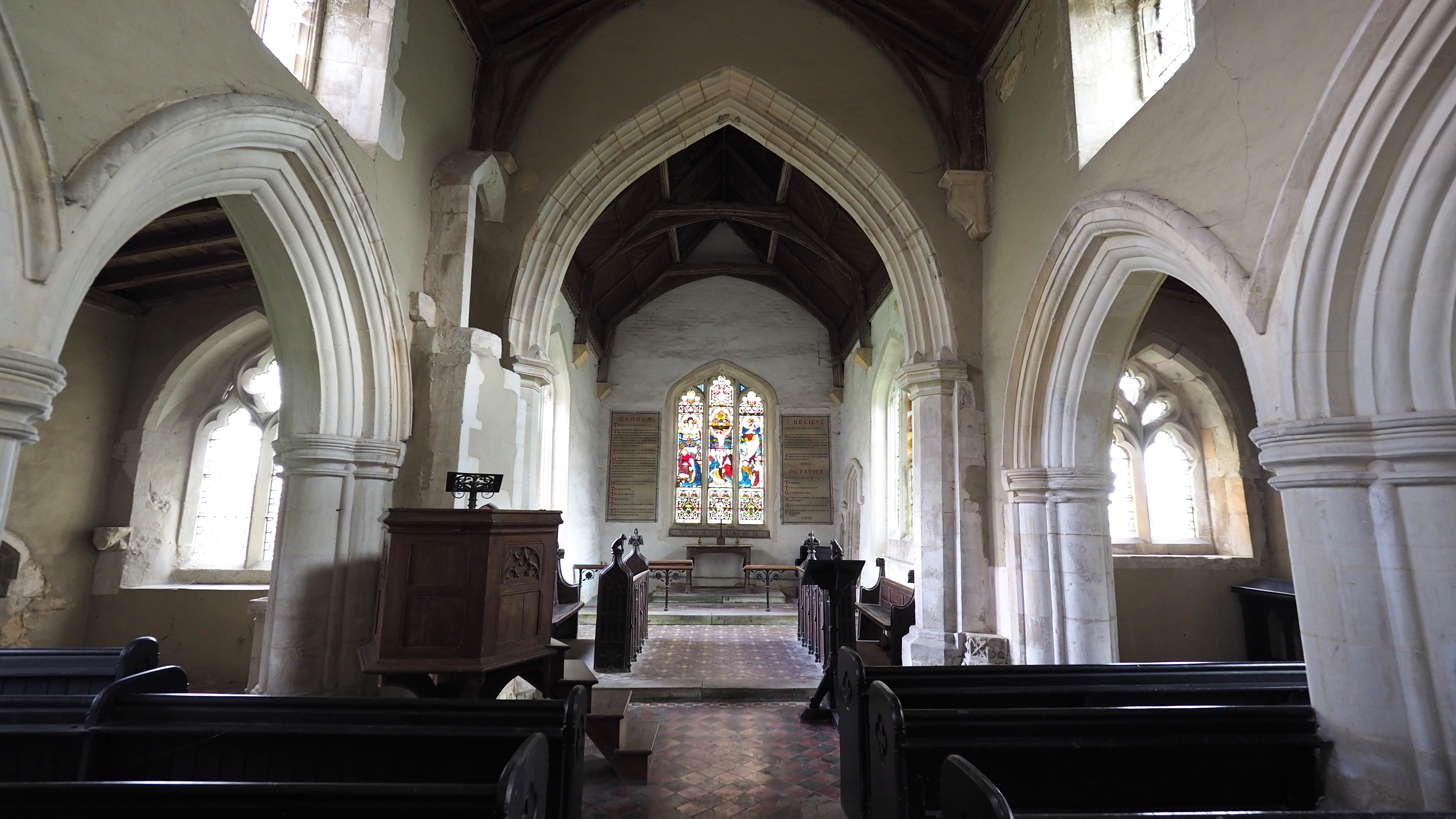
St George's Church, Edworth - east chancel and east end

=== Interior ===
Inside the church are two-bay arcades on each side that extend only along the eastern part of the nave. At the northeast corner of the nave is a rood staircase. The octagonal font dates from the 15th century and features carved panels. The north aisle contains an unusual piscina standing on a pillar dating from the 12th century. On the wall of the north aisle is a fragment of a 14th-century wall painting. In the chancel are 15th-century pews with poppyheads and with finials carved with lions and bears. The windows in the south windows of the chancel and clerestory contain fragments of medieval stained glass. There is a ring of three bells. The oldest bell is dated 1480 and was cast by John Kebyll. The others were cast in 1615 by Newcombe, and in 1623 by William Haulsey.

== See also ==
- List of churches preserved by the Churches Conservation Trust in the East of England
