= Tetworth =

Village in Cambridgeshire, England

Coordinates: 52.16°N 0.22°W

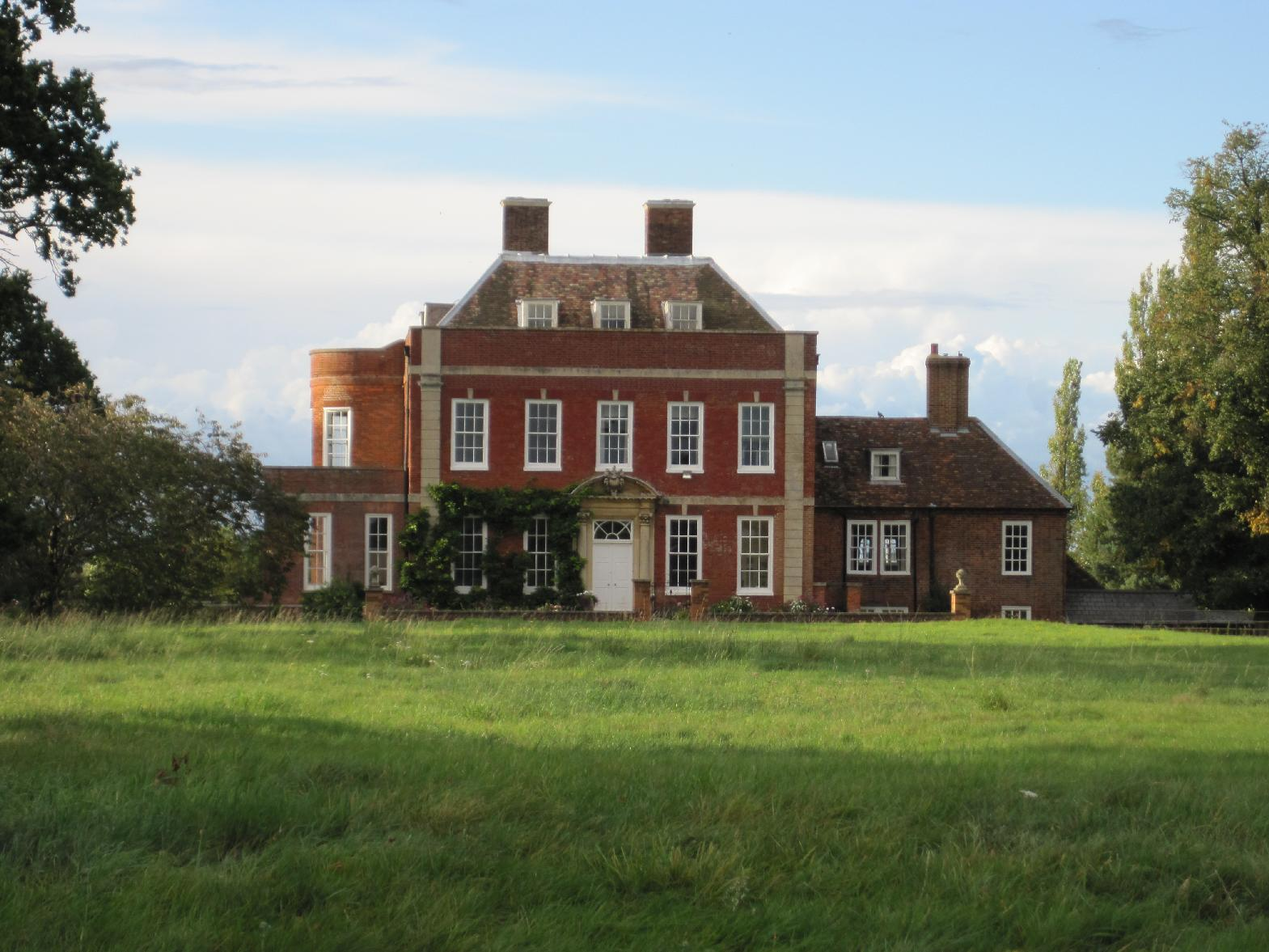
- Tetworth Hall

- Location within Cambridgeshire
- Population: 45 (2001)
- OS grid reference: TL217528
- Civil parish: Waresley-cum-Tetworth
- District: Huntingdonshire
- Shire county: Cambridgeshire
- Region: East
- Country: England
- Sovereign state: United Kingdom
- Post town: Sandy
- Postcode district: SG19
- Police: Cambridgeshire
- Fire: Cambridgeshire
- Ambulance: East of England
- UK Parliament: Huntingdon

Tetworth is a village and former civil parish, now in the parish of Waresley-cum-Tetworth, in Cambridgeshire, England. Tetworth lies approximately 12 miles (19 km)south of Huntingdon, near Waresley south of St Neots. Tetworth is situated within Huntingdonshire which is a non-metropolitan district of Cambridgeshire as well as being a historic county of United Kingdom. In 2001 the parish had a population of 45.

== History ==
The parish of Tetworth (red) in relation to Huntingdonshire (pink), Cambridgeshire (yellow) and Bedfordshire (green) 1844–1965

Originally a hamlet in the parish of Everton, Bedfordshire (where the population was in 2011 included), Tetworth has a complicated administrative history. The hamlet, which was considered a civil parish separate from Everton from the Inclosure Award of 1802, was in two distinct parts. The northern part was in Huntingdonshire, the southern partly an exclave of Huntingdonshire and partly of Bedfordshire. The Counties (Detached Parts) Act 1844 assigned the Bedfordshire part to Huntingdonshire, so that the entire southern section became an outlier of Huntingdonshire, separated from the rest of the county by a salient of Cambridgeshire. This situation remained until 1965, when two new counties of Cambridgeshire and Isle of Ely and Huntingdon and Peterborough were formed. At this time both county and parish boundaries were adjusted, Tetworth now being a single area in Huntingdon and Peterborough. In 1974 it was made part of the enlarged Cambridgeshire. The parish, formerly covering 2,235 acres (904 ha) was combined with Waresley on 1 April 2010, as Waresley-cum-Tetworth.

Listed as Tethewurda in the 12th century and Tetteworth or Tettesworthe in the 13th century, the name Tetworth is believed to mean "farmstead of a man named Tetta".

A Roman road from Sandy to Godmanchester runs through Tetworth, with a footpath following most of its route.

== Government ==
Tetworth is part of the civil parish of Waresley-cum-Tetworth, which has a parish council. The parish council is elected by the residents of the parish who have registered on the electoral roll; the parish council is the lowest tier of government in England. A parish council is responsible for providing and maintaining a variety of local services including allotments and a cemetery; grass cutting and tree planting within public open spaces such as a village green or playing fields. The parish council reviews all planning applications that might affect the parish and makes recommendations to Huntingdonshire District Council, which is the local planning authority for the parish. The parish council also represents the views of the parish on issues such as local transport, policing and the environment. The parish council raises its own tax to pay for these services, known as the parish precept, which is collected as part of the Council Tax. the parish council consists of five parish councillors and a parish clerk. The parish council normally meets four times a year. The parish precept for the financial year ending 31 March 2015 was £4,000.

The second tier of local government is Huntingdonshire District Council which is a non-metropolitan district of Cambridgeshire and has its headquarters in Huntingdon. Huntingdonshire District Council has 52 councillors representing 29 district wards. Huntingdonshire District Council collects the council tax, and provides services such as building regulations, local planning, environmental health, leisure and tourism. Tetworth is a part of the district ward of Gransden and The Offords and is represented on the district council by two councillors. District councillors serve for four-year terms following elections to Huntingdonshire District Council.

For Tetworth the highest tier of local government is Cambridgeshire County Council which has administration buildings in Cambridge. The county council provides county-wide services such as major road infrastructure, fire and rescue, education, social services, libraries and heritage services. Cambridgeshire County Council consists of 69 councillors representing 60 electoral divisions. Tetworth is part of the electoral division of Buckden, Gransden and The Offords and is represented on the county council by one councillor.

At Westminster Tetworth is in the parliamentary constituency of Huntingdon, and elects one Member of Parliament (MP) by the first past the post system of election. Tetworth is represented in the House of Commons by Jonathan Djanogly (Conservative). Jonathan Djanogly has represented the constituency since 2001. The previous member of parliament was John Major (Conservative) who represented the constituency between 1983 and 2001.

== Demography ==
=== Population ===
In the period 1801 to 1901 the population of Tetworth was recorded every ten years by the UK census. During this time the population was in the range of 130 (the lowest was in 1901) and 261 (the highest was in 1861).

From 1901, a census was taken every ten years with the exception of 1941 (due to the Second World War).

Parish	1911	1921	1931	1951	1961	1971	1981	1991	2001	2011
Tetworth	178	159	131	107	118	55	45	35	52	

All population census figures from report Historic Census figures Cambridgeshire to 2011 by Cambridgeshire Insight. The separate parishes of Tetworth and Waresley were combined to form the single parish called Waresley cum Tetworth in 2010.

== Religious sites ==
For ecclesiastical purposes both Everton and Tetworth were always part of the single Everton (or Everton-cum-Tetworth) parish, with the parish church situated in the detached part of the Tetworth civil parish. The church, dedicated to St Mary, was mentioned in the Domesday Book but was rebuilt in the 12th century, with the majority of that building still surviving today. A west tower was added in the 14th century, and the chancel was rebuilt in the 15th century.

John Berridge, friend of John Wesley, was vicar of the parish between 1755 and 1793.

== Tetworth Hall ==
Tetworth Hall stands on the edge of the Greensand Ridge overlooking the valley of the River Ivel at the southern end of the present parish. The house was built in 1710 for the MP John Pedley, and is a two-storey red brick mansion in the Queen Anne style to which it dates.

After the Pedley line died out in 1726, the house was bought by Edward Harley, 2nd Earl of Oxford before passing to the Lord Chancellor, Philip Yorke, 1st Earl of Hardwicke in 1740. In 1759 it was acquired by Stanhope Pedley, a relation of the original owners, who retained it until 1823 after which it passed to the Foley family.

By 1895 it was owned by Charles Duncombe, 2nd Earl of Feversham who leased it to Augustus Scobell Orlebar. His son, Augustus Orlebar, was a distinguished RAF pilot.

During the Second World War it was requisitioned by the government, though its use during this period is not fully known.
