= Hundred of Biggleswade =

Historic administrative division in Bedfordshire, England

Coordinates: 52.08733°N 0.26521°W

Biggleswade
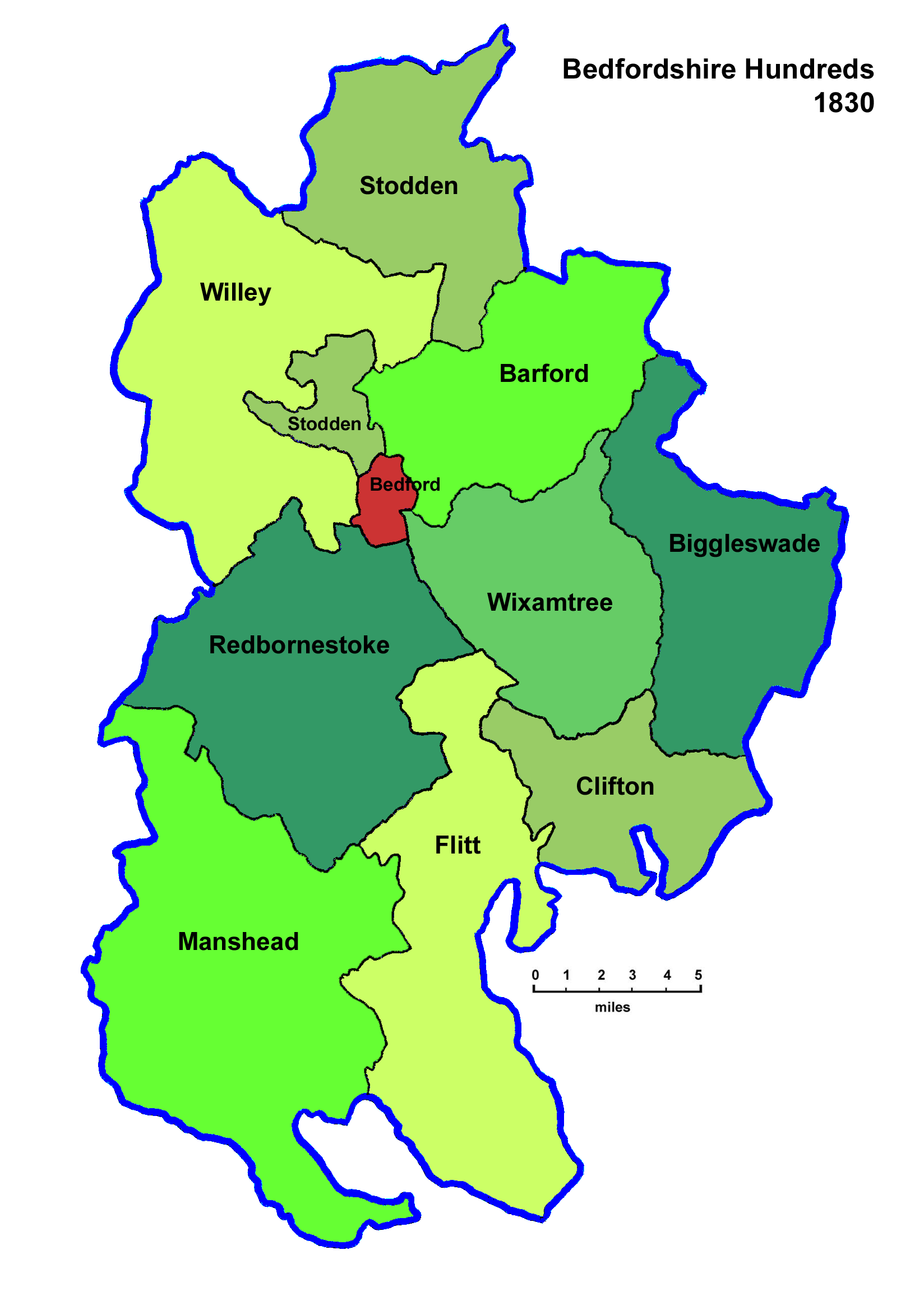
- The Hundreds of Bedfordshire in 1830

- Location within Bedfordshire
- OS grid reference: TL195445
- Unitary authority: Central Bedfordshire
- Ceremonial county: Bedfordshire
- Region: East
- Country: England
- Sovereign state: United Kingdom
- Police: Bedfordshire
- Fire: Bedfordshire
- Ambulance: East of England

Biggleswade was a historic hundred of the English county of Bedfordshire. The hundred consisted of the town of Biggleswade and its surrounding area. The name Biggleswade comes from a concatenation of the Anglo Saxon words 'Biceil' (being a personal name) and 'Waed' (meaning a ford).

== History ==
Evidence suggests that the area which Biggleswade now occupies was inhabited as early as 10,000 BC. Coins dated to the 1st century BC have also been found, and traced back to the Celtic chief Tasciovanus, who resided in what is now St Albans, Hertfordshire. During the 5th century AD Saxons named the river Ivel and built settlements which evolved into the present day villages of Northill and Southill, to the west of Biggleswade.

The Domesday Survey records the manor of Biggleswade as being governed by Ralph de Insula (Ralph de Lisle), on behalf of the monarch. Later, in the 12th century, Henry I transferred custody of Biggleswade to the Bishop of Lincoln. Successive bishops maintained significant influence until the mid 16th century, when Edward VI obtained direct control over the town and its surrounding area.

By the end of the 13th century, the half-hundred of Weneslai, which at Domesday included the parishes of Hatley, Everton, Potton, Sandy and Sutton had been subsumed into the hundred of Biggleswade.

In 1785 'the great fire' swept through the town of Biggleswade and destroyed many of its buildings. The subsequent rebuilding effort, along with other factors, encouraged more people to settle in the town, triggering a significant (80%) population growth during the first half of the 19th century. This culminated in 1850, when Biggleswade became the first town in Bedfordshire to gain a mainline train station.

== Physical geography ==
The River Ivel runs along the northern and western boundaries of the town of Biggleswade. The surrounding area is generally flat and open, with the occasional small wooded area. There is some modestly higher ground to the west of the town. The hundred of Biggleswade was located to the south east of Bedford.

== Transport links ==
Biggleswade is served by the A1 road, which went right through the heart of the town until a bypass was built in the 1960s.

It is also accessible via rail lines that connect it to London King's Cross, Stevenage and Hitchin to the south and St. Neots, Huntingdon and Peterborough to the north.

== Local amenities ==
- Biggleswade Congregation, Shortmead Street, Biggleswade, Bedfordshire (Jehovah's Witnesses)
- Biggleswade Hospital, Elmside Potton Road, Biggleswade, Bedfordshire
- Biggleswade Recreation Centre, Eagle Farm Road, Biggleswade, Bedfordshire
- Biggleswade Station, Station Road, Biggleswade, Bedfordshire

== Parishes ==
The hundred contained the following parishes:

Astwick, Little Barford, Biggleswade, Cockayne Hatley, Dunton, Edworth, Everton, Eyeworth, Langford, Potton, Sandy, Sutton, Tempsford, Wrestlingworth

== See also ==
- Hundreds of Bedfordshire

== External links and sources ==
- http://www.BiggleswadeHistory.org.uk
- http://www.BiggleswadeTownPlan.org.uk
- http://www.biggleswade.org/
- https://web.archive.org/web/20110127213653/http://www.biggleswademasterplan.info/
- https://web.archive.org/web/20050318224845/http://www.yourtotalevent.com/places/Bedfordshire/biggleswade%20history.htm
- Biggleswade: historical and genealogical information at GENUKI.
