= Holwell, Hertfordshire =

Village in Hertfordshire, England

Coordinates: 51.98623°N 0.30493°W

Holwell
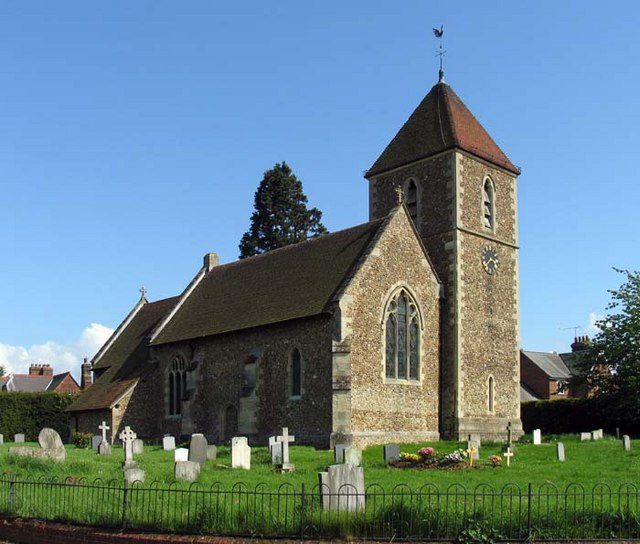
- St Peter's Church, Holwell

- Location within Hertfordshire
- Population: 425 (Parish, 2021)
- OS grid reference: TL165333
- Civil parish: Holwell
- District: North Hertfordshire
- Shire county: Hertfordshire
- Region: East
- Country: England
- Sovereign state: United Kingdom
- Post town: Hitchin
- Postcode district: SG5
- Dialling code: 01462
- Police: Hertfordshire
- Fire: Hertfordshire
- Ambulance: East of England
- UK Parliament: Hitchin

Holwell is a village and a civil parish in the North Hertfordshire district of Hertfordshire, England. It lies 3 miles (5 km) north of Hitchin, near the Bedfordshire border. The parish was historically part of Bedfordshire, and was transferred to Hertfordshire in 1897. The population of the parish was 425 at the 2021 census.

== History ==
The parish church of St Peter is unusual and, although largely rebuilt between 1877 and 1879, retains some Perpendicular features and an interesting brass to Richard Wodehouse.

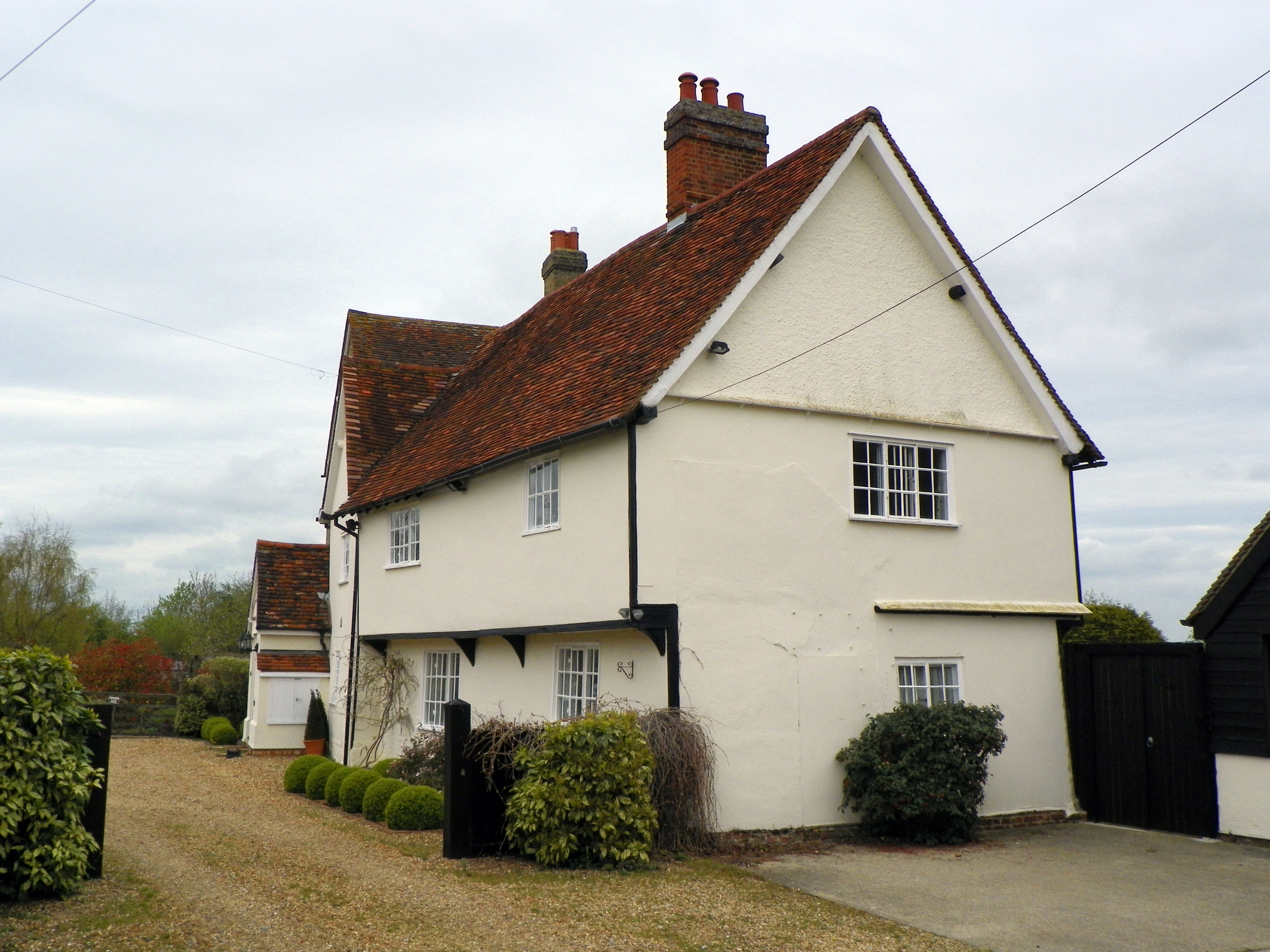
Church Farmhouse

Fragments of early wall paintings and wooden mullioned windows have been discovered in the medieval timber-framed Church Farmhouse.

The parish was bequeathed money under the will of John Rand, a London joiner who died in 1706. It is assumed he was originally from Holwell as other Rands appear in the parish registers in the mid-1600s, albeit John's precise connection to them is unclear. The John Rand Charity was set up with the bequest, and has provided various facilities for Holwell and neighbouring villages over the years. In the 1830s, the charity paid for a new school, almshouses, and a rectory, all of which were built in a similar neo-Tudor style. They have all since been converted into housing. The charity still exists as Rand's Educational Foundation, and is now focused on providing support for young people in Holwell and neighbouring parishes.

== Governance ==
Holwell has three tiers of local government at parish, district and county level: Holwell Parish Council, North Hertfordshire District Council, and Hertfordshire County Council. The parish council generally meets at the pavilion at the John Rand Recreation Ground. There is also a village hall on Pirton Road.

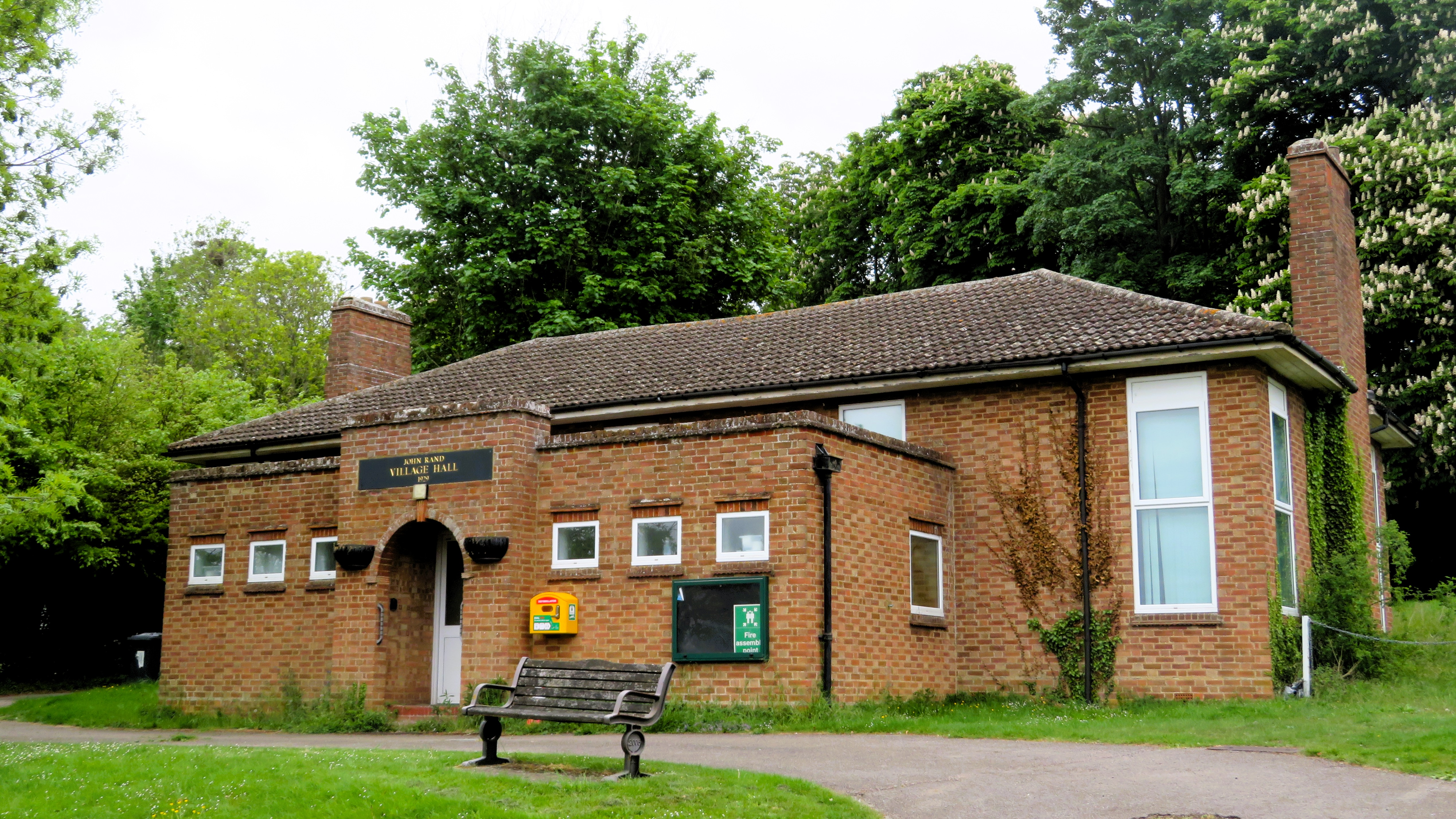
John Rand Village Hall, Pirton Road

Holwell is an ancient parish, which historically formed part of the Clifton Hundred of Bedfordshire. From 1835, the parish was included in the Hitchin poor law union. Holwell was the only Bedfordshire parish in the union, the rest of which was in Hertfordshire. Poor law unions subsequently formed the basis for the rural sanitary districts established in 1872, which were in turn converted into rural districts under the Local Government Act 1894. The 1894 Act directed that districts were no longer allowed to straddle county boundaries. Special dispensation was granted to the Hitchin Rural District to allow it to temporarily straddle the county boundary whilst the boundaries were reviewed. The situation was resolved when the parish was transferred from Bedfordshire to Hertfordshire in 1897.

Holwell parish formerly had an exclave at Cadwell, east of Ickleford; it was transferred to Ickleford parish in 1985.

== Population ==
At the 2021 census, the population of the parish was 425. The population had been 361 in 2011.

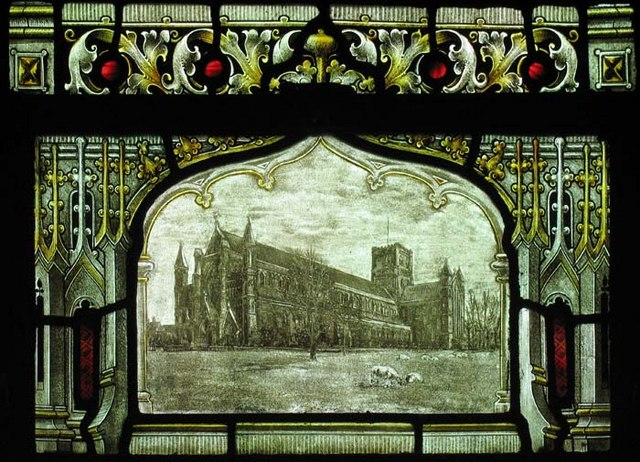
Window in St Peter's church, Holwell depicting St Albans Cathedral
