= Dunton, Bedfordshire =

Village in Bedfordshire, England

Coordinates: 52.0828°N 0.1951°W

Dunton
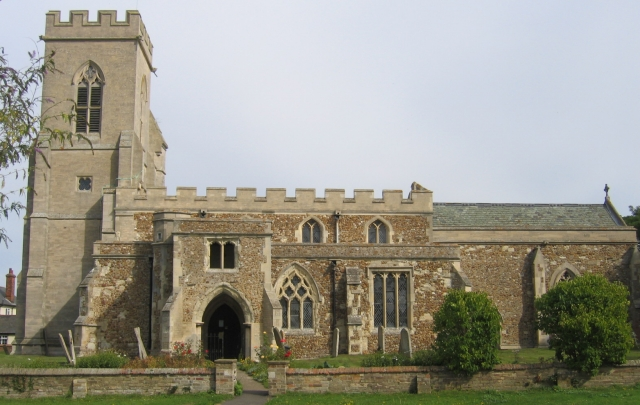
- Dunton parish church

- Location within Bedfordshire
- Population: 696 (2011 Census including Edworth)
- OS grid reference: TL2344
- Unitary authority: Central Bedfordshire
- Ceremonial county: Bedfordshire
- Region: East
- Country: England
- Sovereign state: United Kingdom
- Post town: biggleswade
- Postcode district: SG18
- Dialling code: 01767
- Police: Bedfordshire
- Fire: Bedfordshire
- Ambulance: East of England
- UK Parliament: North Bedfordshire

Dunton is a village and civil parish in the Central Bedfordshire district of the county of Bedfordshire, England; about 12 miles (19 km) east south-east of the county town of Bedford. The civil parish includes the hamlets of Newton and Millow.

== Geography ==
Dunton lies about 3 miles (5 km) east of Biggleswade and 16 miles (26 km) south-west of Cambridge. The eastern parish boundary borders Hertfordshire at the River Rhee.

=== Landscape ===
Natural England has designated the area as part of The Bedfordshire and Cambridgeshire Claylands (NCA 88). Central Bedfordshire Council has classified the landscape as Dunton Clay Vale (5G). The majority of the parish is open, arable farmland with medium to large fields. Dunton lies on a ridge of land that forms part of the watershed between the River Ivel to the west and the Rhee to the east. Tributary streams and drainage channels run through the area. Field boundaries are largely short flailed, gappy hedges. The limited woodland creates a very open landscape. Occasional mature hedgerow trees and roadside oaks on grass verges are a feature.

=== Elevation ===
The village centre is 53 metres (174 ft) above sea level. The land is gently undulating and falls away to 33 metres (108 ft) in the north, west and south of the parish.

=== Geology and soil type ===
The centre and west of the parish lie on boulder clay; with gault to the east. The whole parish has lime-rich loamy and clayey soils with slightly impeded drainage. Fertility is high.

== Governance ==
Dunton Parish Council has seven elected members and meets bi-monthly at the village hall. Dunton is part of Potton ward for elections to the Central Bedfordshire Unitary Authority.

Prior to 1894, Dunton was administered as part of the Hundred of Biggleswade. From 1894 until 1974 the village was in Biggleswade Rural District and from 1974 to 2009 in Mid Bedfordshire District.

== History ==
Population growth in Dunton since 1801
Year	Pop.	±%
1801	336	—
1841	434	+29.2%
1881	477	+9.9%
1921	390	−18.2%
1961	437	+12.1%
2001	567	+29.7%
Source: A Vision of Britain through Time

Dunton appears in the Domesday Book as Donitone or Danitone. The name is taken to mean 'hill village', although an earlier source interprets the name to mean Duna's Farm. Millom appears as Meluho or Melnho, in 1396 and Dunton appears as Duntone. .

Dunton Inclosure Act 1797
- Act of Parliament
- Parliament of Great Britain
- Long title: An act for dividing and enclosing the open and common fields, meadows, pastures, and other commonable lands and grounds, in the parish of Dunton in the county of Bedford.
- Citation: 37 Geo. 3. c. 23 Pr.
- Territorial extent: Great Britain

Dates
- Royal assent: 7 March 1797
- Commencement: 7 March 1797 (Note: The Acts of Parliament (Commencement) Act 1793.)

Status: Current legislation

In 1797, an inclosure act, the Dunton Inclosure Act 1797 (37 Geo. 3. c. 23 Pr.) was passed.

The March Hare public house, formerly The Wheatsheaf, opened in 1840.

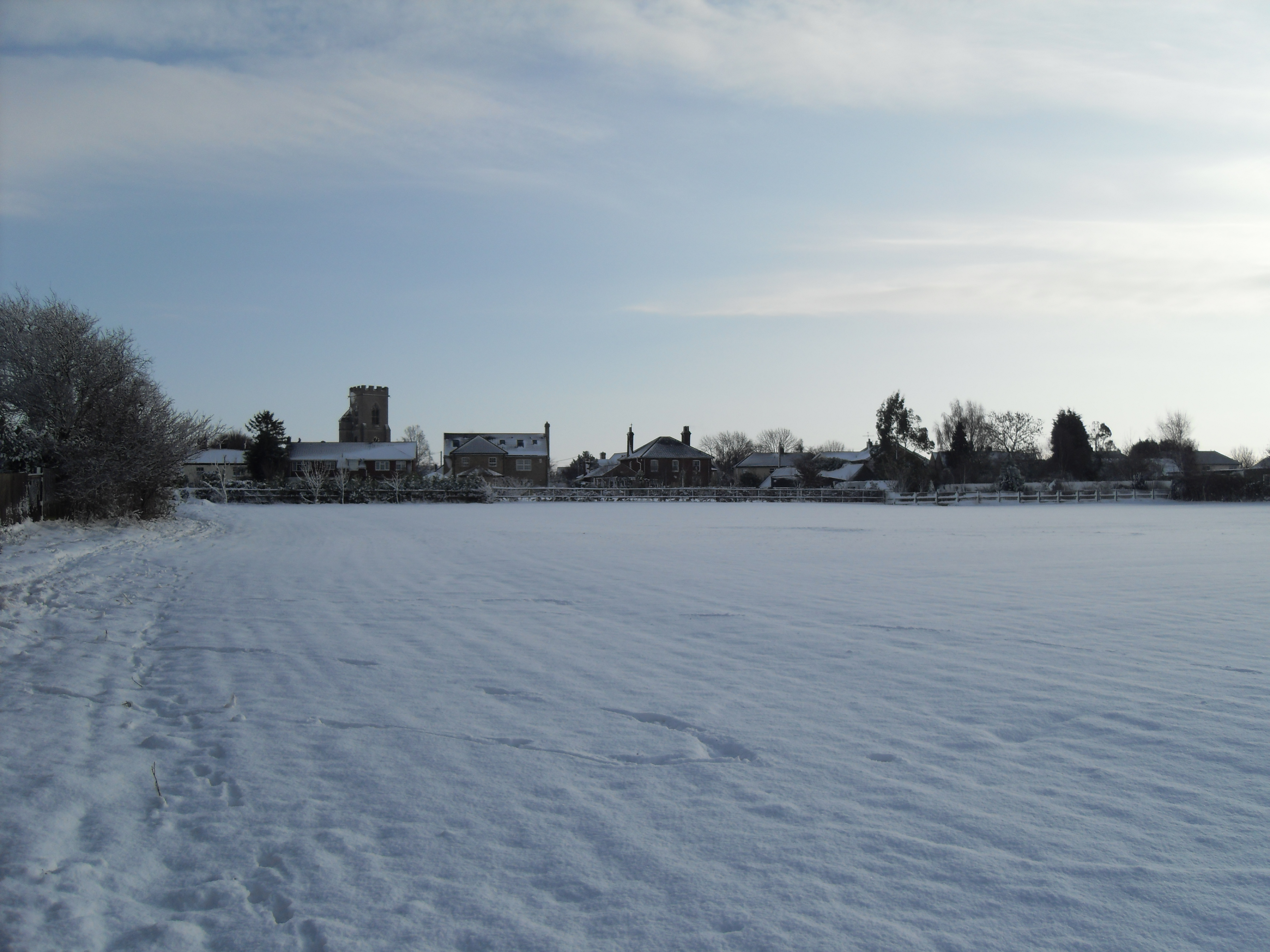
Dunton on a snowy day in 2009

=== Parish church ===
Central to the village is the Church of St. Mary Magdalene in the diocese of St Albans. The earliest parts date from the 14th-century and consist of a chancel, nave of four bays, aisles and porch. The church steeple collapsed in 1660. The 60 feet (18 m) tall limestone ashlar embattled western tower dates from 1861 and is illuminated at night. The church's five bells were hung in 1887 in commemoration of the Golden Jubilee of Queen Victoria. The south porch was partially rebuilt and the chancel restored in 1861.

The church is a focal point for the local community. The Dunton Folk Club host folk music concerts and traditional sessions in the church.

=== Transportation of supergrid transformers ===
On the 11th of February 2024 a supergrid transformer weighing 178-tonnes for the nearby Biggleswade Substation on Dunton Road was delivered via the village. Much of the village turned up to view the transformer pass through the roads of the village in what was said to be the largest outdoor gathering of villagers since 1876.

== Public services ==
Dunton is in the Potton Public Water Supply Zone (RW50). The water supplied by Anglian Water comes from groundwater boreholes and is chloraminated and classed as hard. There is a water treatment works on the Cambridge Road.

The Eastern Power Area of UK Power Networks is the distribution network operator for electricity. There is no natural gas supply.

The two nearest general hospitals are Bedford (Bedford Hospital NHS Trust) and Lister Hospital, Stevenage (East and North Hertfordshire NHS Trust). Ambulance services are provided by the East of England Ambulance Service NHS Trust. Bedfordshire Fire and Rescue Service and Bedfordshire Police cover the parish.

The nearest public library is at Biggleswade.

== Schools and public facilities ==
The village has a small Voluntary Controlled Lower School which teaches children up the age of 9.

The Memorial Hall built in 1925 is available to hire.

== Culture and community ==
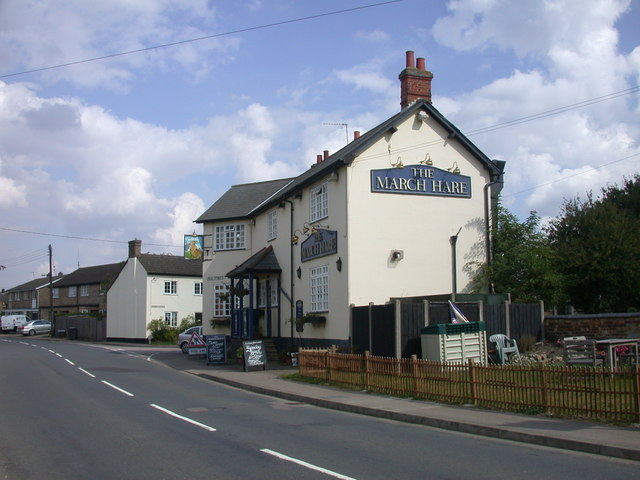
The March Hare, Dunton

The March Hare freehouse is the last of 5 pubs that once existed in the village. For a few years, the pub stood derelict and boarded up, but was restored and reopened in 2010. It now serves local ale and Dunton's own craft cider. In 2013, it was awarded the East Bedfordshire CAMRA branch pub of the year. A community shop is alongside. Opposite the March Hare is the former Post Office, which closed in 2006.

Since January 2012 the annual Dunton Wassail has taken place at Church Farm: a tradition where noise is made to waken the apple trees from their winter slumber and cider soaked toast is hung on the trees. There is Morris dancing and mulled cider, and the evening ends with live folk music and acoustics at the March Hare.

Dunton’s Big Weekender is the name for a programme of events over 3 or 4 days which include the village's annual summer fete, a car treasure hunt, race night, charity quiz and games evening.

There is a one-and-a-half acre community garden at Church Farm.

== Public transport ==
The 188 Centrebus service to Hitchin via Biggleswade, and to Sandy via Wrestlingworth and Potton runs two hourly Monday to Saturday. There is no service on Sunday and bank holidays.

The nearest railway station is Biggleswade.

== Sport ==
A playing field and sports pavilion is maintained by the Dunton Recreation Association charity.

Dunton Football club was formed in the early 1900s. The club joined the Biggleswade & District League in 1919 and the Bedford & District League for the 1952–53 season. In the 1968–68 season they were Bedford & District Jubilee Cup winners. 1973–74 saw the club win the Bedford & District Aubrey Tingey Memorial Cup. In 1974–75 they were Bedford & District League Division 2 champions and in 1974–75, 1975–76 and 2002–03 S.A. Butcher Cup winners. Perhaps their greatest achievement was becoming 1993–94 Bedford & District Premier League champions.

The club folded at the end of the 2004–05 season but reformed for the 2007–08 season. They played in the Bedfordshire Football League Division 1 and then the Premier Division until 2011–12 when the club finished 2nd from bottom and disappeared.
