= Wixamtree =

Ancient administrative division in Bedfordshire, England

Coordinates: 52.087°N 0.331°W

- Hundred
- Location within the United Kingdom
- Country: England
- Sovereign state: United Kingdom
- Parishes: Blunham, Cardington, Cople, Northill, Southill, Old Warden, Willington

Wixamtree is an ancient hundred located in Bedfordshire, England.

Wixamtree was one of the hundreds of Bedfordshire, with its council being the primary form of local government in its area from the Anglo-Saxon times to the nineteenth century.

== Parishes ==
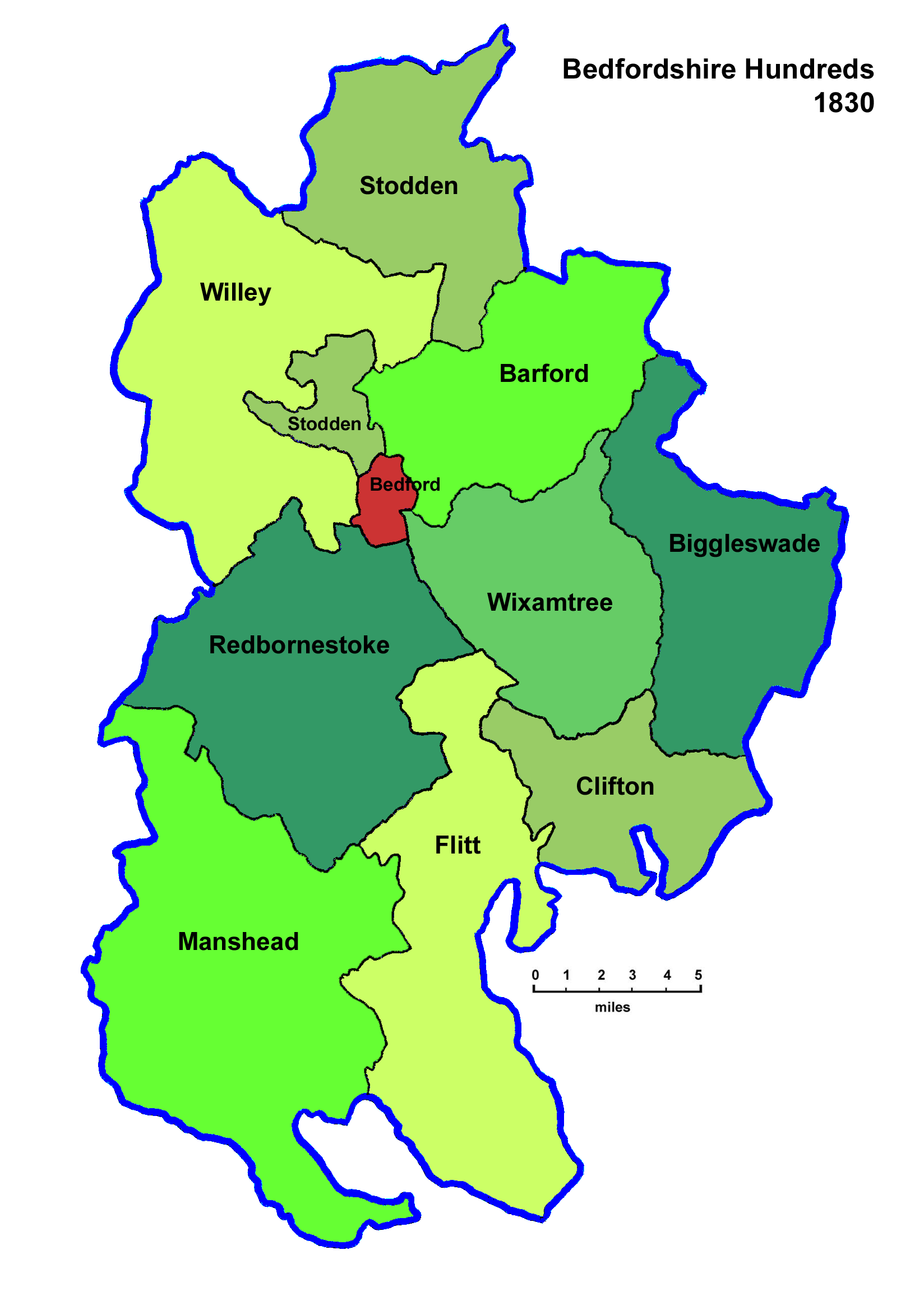
The Hundreds of Bedfordshire in 1830

The hundred contained the following parishes:

Blunham, Cardington, Cople, Northill, Southill, Old Warden, Willington

== See also ==
- Hundreds of Bedfordshire
- Wixams new town, named after the ancient hundred (though not located in it)
