= Everton, Bedfordshire =

Village in Bedfordshire, England

Coordinates: 52.14604°N 0.24624°W

Everton
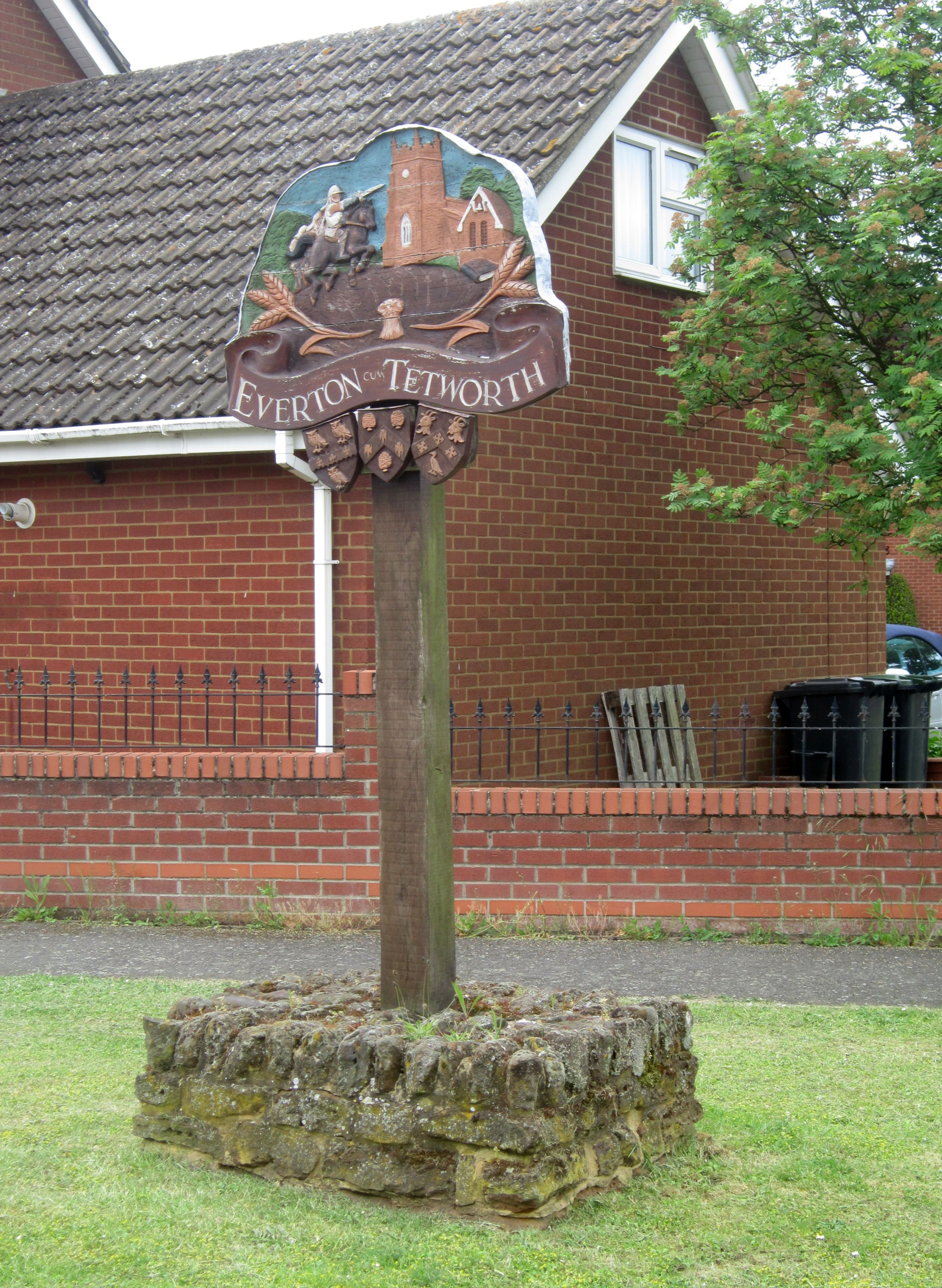
- The village sign for Everton-cum-Tetworth

- Location within Bedfordshire
- Population: 523 (2011 Census)
- OS grid reference: TL201512
- Unitary authority: Central Bedfordshire
- Ceremonial county: Bedfordshire
- Region: East
- Country: England
- Sovereign state: United Kingdom
- Post town: SANDY
- Postcode district: SG19
- Dialling code: 01767
- Police: Bedfordshire
- Fire: Bedfordshire
- Ambulance: East of England
- UK Parliament: North Bedfordshire

Everton is a small rural village of about 200 dwellings (including outlying) and civil parish in the Central Bedfordshire district of Bedfordshire, England about 9 miles (14 km) east of the county town of Bedford.

== Geography ==
Everton is 2 miles (3 km) north-east of Sandy, 16 miles (26 km) west of Cambridge and 43.5 miles (70 km) north of Central London.

Parish area and boundaries

The civil parish covers an area of 1,087 hectares (2,686 acres) and is boot-shaped. The White Way, a former Roman road forms part of the parish's north-western boundary. The north and north-eastern boundary is with Cambridgeshire.

Landscape

Natural England has categorised the landscape into National Character Areas. The village and higher land of the parish lie within the Bedfordshire Greensand Ridge. The western lower lying area is part of the Bedfordshire and Cambridgeshire Claylands. Central Bedfordshire Council further divides the landscape into more local areas. The west of the parish forms part of the predominantly flat, Biggin Wood Clay Vale. Mixed roadside hedgerows are a feature with grass verges and roadside trees of ash, field maple and oak. The occasional solitary farm dots the landscape. The surrounding area is mostly arable farmland. The village and higher ground are part of the Everton Heath Greensand Ridge, which has a fairly steep northwest facing slope backed by an area of undulating land forming the ridge top. Woodbury Park just to the north of the village is grassland and woodland. White Wood is an ancient woodland of about 60 acres (24 ha). Most of the trees are pine but the lime trees are about 200 years old and some of the oaks date back 300 years.

Elevation

The village centre at 67 metres (220 ft) above sea level overlooks lower lying land to the west that falls to 19 metres (62 ft). Tempsford Road has a 14% gradient. The highest point is 80 metres (262 ft) at White Wood to the northeast of the village.

Geology and soil type

The village itself lies on Lower Greensand whilst the western area of the parish is on Oxford Clay overlying Kellaways beds. The two areas are separated by a narrow band of Corallian limestone. Around the village the soil is freely draining, slightly acid and sandy with low fertility. The western lower lying area has highly fertile, lime-rich loamy and clayey soils with impeded drainage.

The night sky and light pollution

Light pollution is the level of radiance (night lights) shining up into the night sky. The Campaign to Protect Rural England (CPRE) divides the level of night sky brightness into 9 bands with band 1 being the darkest i.e. with the lowest level of light pollution and band 9 the brightest and most polluted. Everton is in band 4.

The built environment

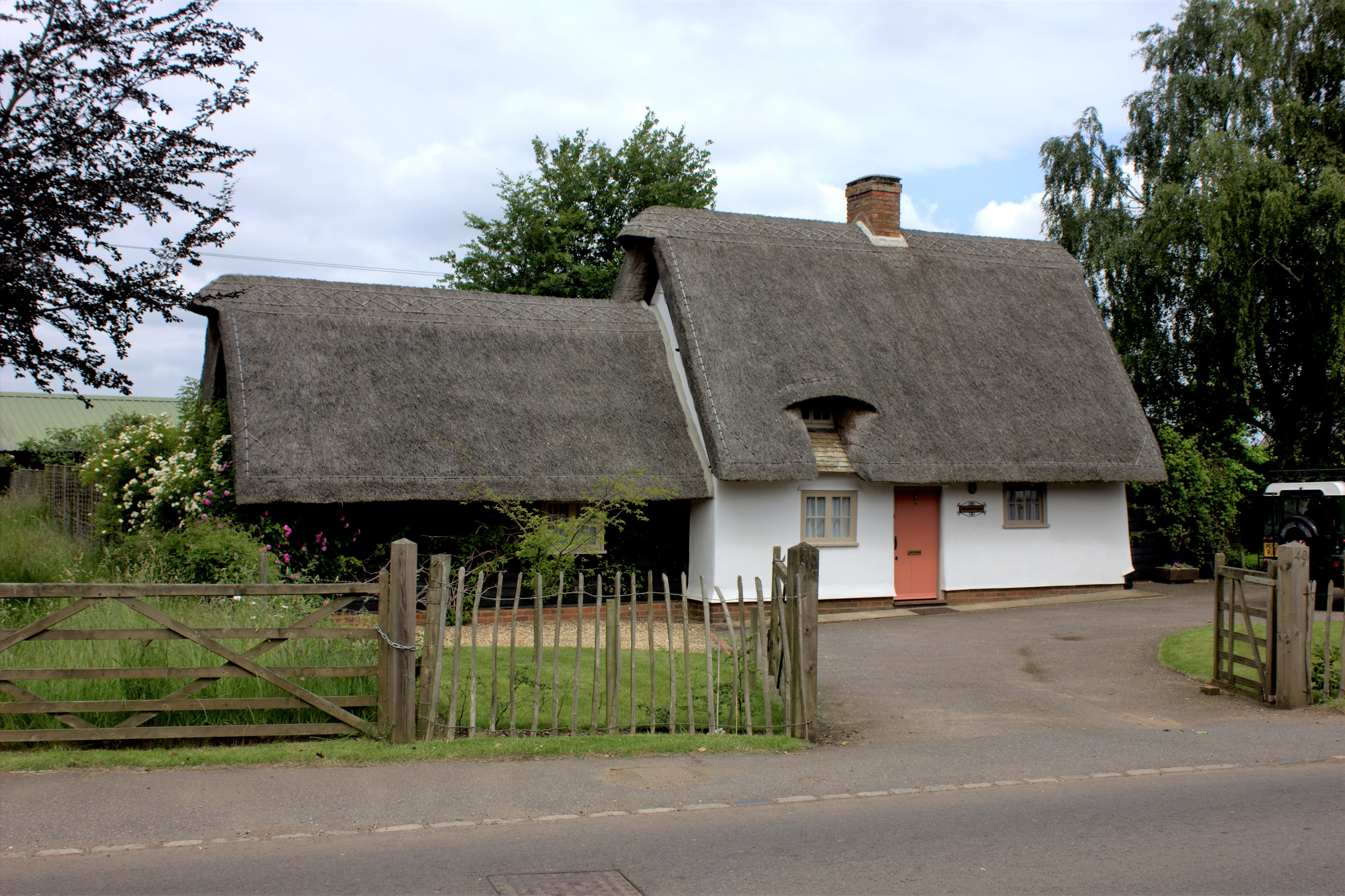
Thatched cottage, Sandy Road

The earliest houses are thatched cottages dating from the 18th century. Most houses are 20th century including some council built houses along Potton and Sandy Roads.

The East Coast Main Line railway passes through the western part of the parish.

Public footpaths

A public footpath runs west then north to Tempsford Station Road. A stretch of the Greensand Ridge Walk runs right through the village; north-east to its start/finish near Tetworth and south-west to Sandy and beyond.

== History ==
The name Everton comes from Old English and means farmstead where wild boars are seen.

Population growth in Everton since 1801
Year	Pop.	±%
1801	141	—
1841	233	+65.2%
1881	216	−7.3%
1921	231	+6.9%
1961	215	−6.9%
2001	525	+144.2%
Source: BEDFORDSHIRE POPULATION FIGURES 1801 – 2011

St Mary's Church is substantially 12th century although the tower, nave clerestory and south porch are 15th century. It is built of coursed ironstone and cobblestones with ashlar dressings. In 1974, the tower was damaged by lightning and reduced to two stages from three. Corner pinnacles topped with weather vanes were added.

Everton was enclosed by Act of Parliament in 1802.

The village is close to the WWII airfield RAF Tempsford.

== Governance ==
Everton Parish Council has seven elected members and meets bi-monthly at the village hall. Everton is part of Potton ward for elections to the Central Bedfordshire Unitary Authority.

Prior to 1894, Everton was administered as part of the Hundred of Biggleswade. From 1894 until 1974 the village was in Biggleswade Rural District and from 1974 to 2009 in Mid Bedfordshire District.

== Community ==
Everton no longer has a shop (closed c. 1995) but has a church and a primary school. There is a large recreation ground which contains both full-sized and five-a-side football pitches, a basketball net, and a children's play area.

There is one public house, the Thornton Arms, whose licensing records go back to 1822.

== Public services ==
Everton is in the Potton Public Water Supply Zone (RW50). The water supplied by Anglian Water comes from groundwater boreholes and is chloraminated and classed as hard.

The Eastern Power Area of UK Power Networks is the distribution network operator for electricity. Cadent Gas owns and operates the area's gas distribution network.

The two nearest general hospitals are Bedford (Bedford Hospital NHS Trust) and Lister Hospital, Stevenage (East and North Hertfordshire NHS Trust). Ambulance services are provided by the East of England Ambulance Service NHS Trust. Bedfordshire Fire and Rescue Service and Bedfordshire Police cover the parish.

There nearest public library is Potton.

== Public transport ==
Grant Palmer runs bus routes 189/190 south to Gamlingay and Biggleswade, and west to Sandy. The service is normally two hourly, daytime only, Monday to Saturday. The Ivel Sprinter buses run a weekly service to St Neots (Thursdays) and Cambridge (Wednesdays).

The nearest railway station is Sandy.

== Woodbury Park ==
To the north of Everton, off Everton Road, is Woodbury Park, originally part of the Gamlingay parish but now part of Bedfordshire. The grounds of Woodbury Hall were laid out by Nathaniel Richmond in the 1760s for the landowner, the Earl of Macclesfield who had married Woodbury heiress Mary Lane.

From the 1860s, it was owned by the Astell family of Everton House. Woodbury Hall is now owned by the Countess of Erroll. an Astell heiress. In World War II the house was requisitioned for military use.
