= Willington, Bedfordshire =

Village in Bedfordshire, England

Coordinates: 52.1316°N 0.3716°W

Willington
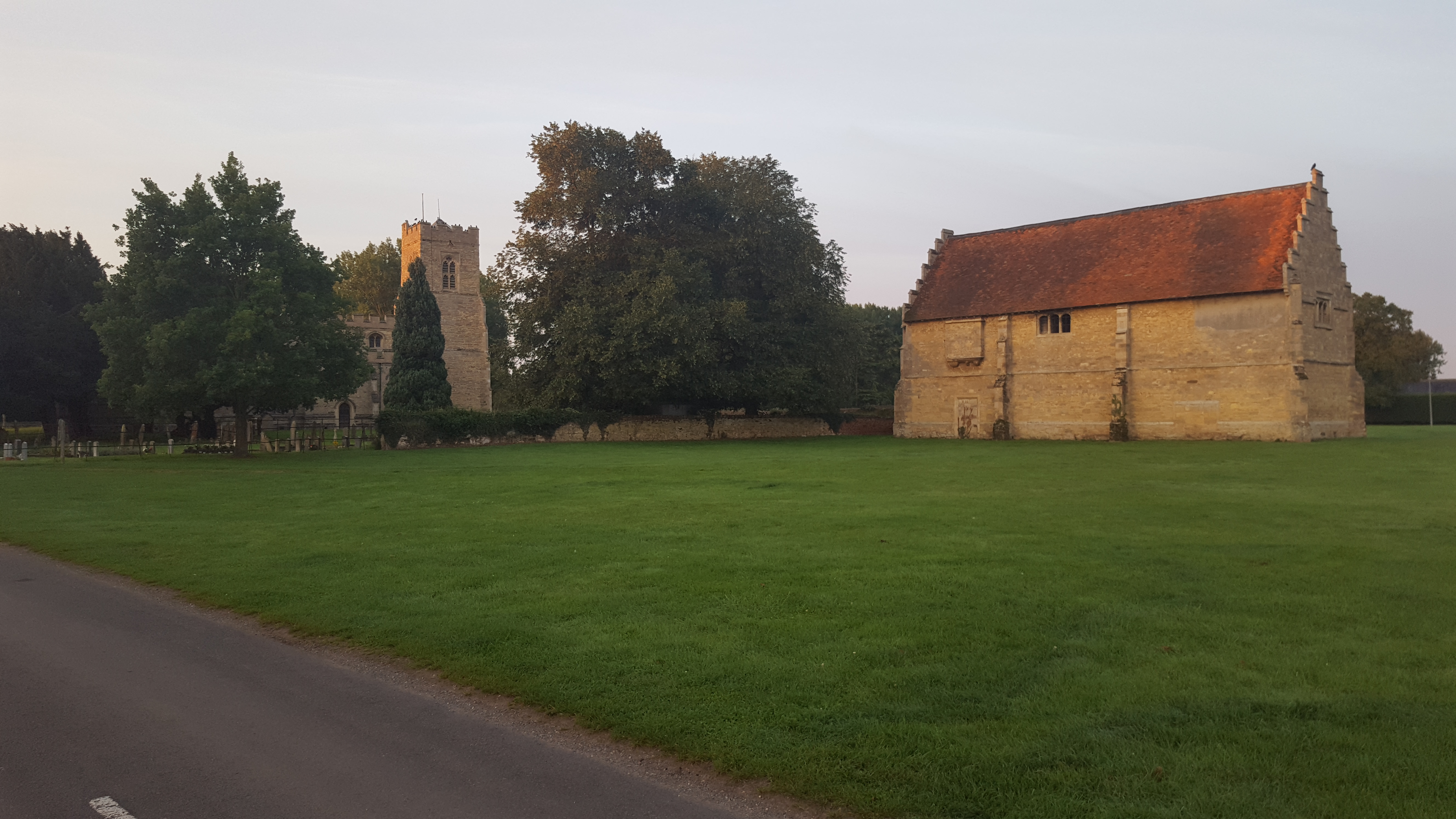
- Church of St Lawrence and the neighbouring stable building

- Location within Bedfordshire
- Population: 751 (2011 Census)
- OS grid reference: TL114434
- Unitary authority: Bedford
- Ceremonial county: Bedfordshire
- Region: East
- Country: England
- Sovereign state: United Kingdom
- Post town: BEDFORD
- Postcode district: MK44
- Dialling code: 01234
- Police: Bedfordshire
- Fire: Bedfordshire
- Ambulance: East of England
- UK Parliament: North Bedfordshire

Willington is a village and civil parish located in the English county of Bedfordshire. It is west of Moggerhanger on the road from Sandy to Bedford. The village is recorded in the Domesday Book as Welitone and as Wilitona in c. 1150, from Old English tun (homestead) among the willows, and is part of the ancient hundred of Wixamtree.

In the parish church of St Lawrence there is a grand 16th-century chapel.

Willington is home to 16th century Willington Dovecote & Stables, both now owned by the National Trust. This is also the location of an ancient moated site.

Willington used to have a railway station on the Sandy to Bedford railway line, now part of the NCR 51 national cycle route.

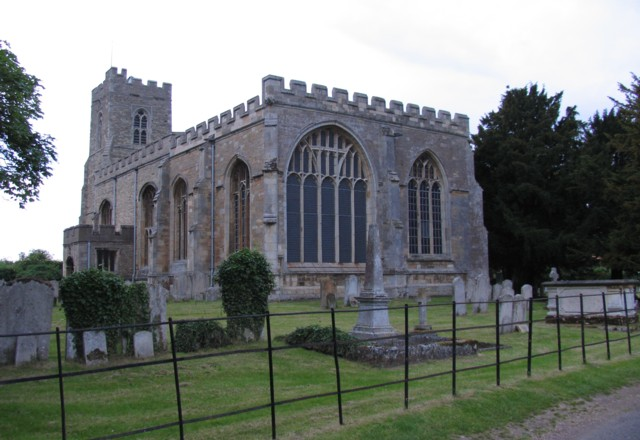
St Lawrence's church

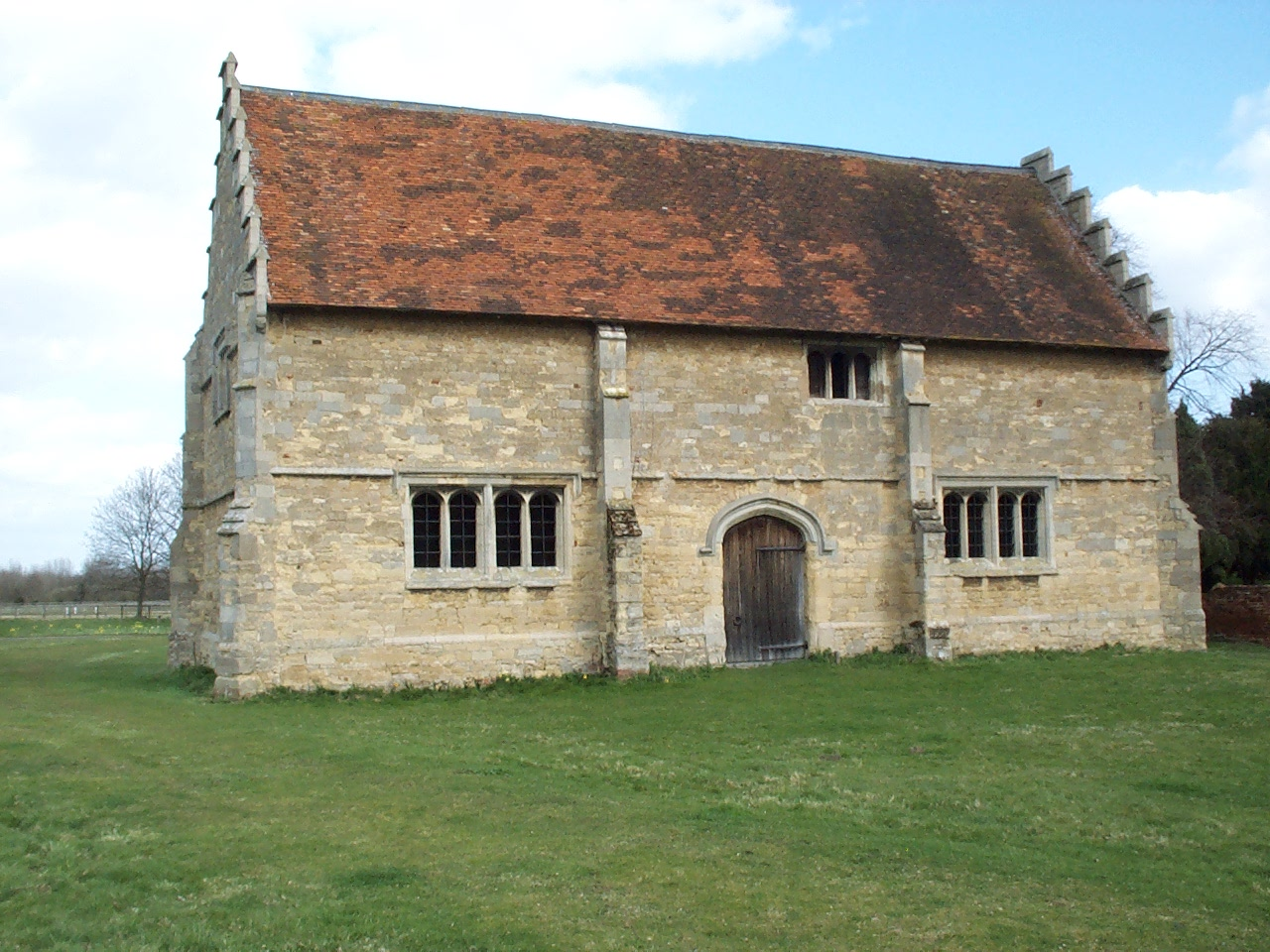
Willington Stables
