= Cople =

Village and civil parish in Bedfordshire, England

Coordinates: 52°07′19″N 0°23′20″W

- Village and civil parish
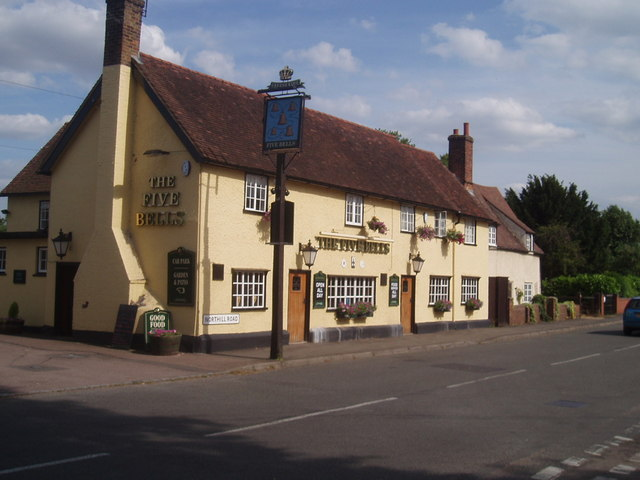
- The Five Bells public house

- Location within Bedfordshire
- Population: 700; 722 (Census 2011)
- OS grid reference: TL1048
- Civil parish: Cople
- Unitary authority: Bedford
- Ceremonial county: Bedfordshire
- Region: East
- Country: England
- Sovereign state: United Kingdom
- Post town: BEDFORD
- Postcode district: MK44
- Dialling code: 01234
- Police: Bedfordshire
- Fire: Bedfordshire
- Ambulance: East of England
- UK Parliament: North Bedfordshire

Cople is a village and civil parish in the English county of Bedfordshire. The name Cople is derived from the phrase Cock Pool, a place where chickens were kept, that was mentioned in the Domesday Book.

== History ==
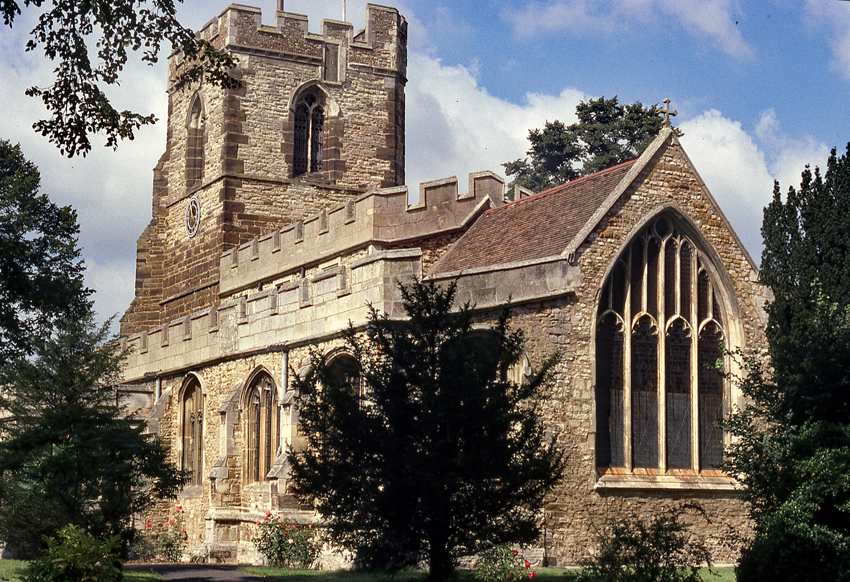
All Saints church, Cople

Cople is part of the ancient hundred of Wixamtree.

The centre of Cople is dominated by All Saints Church, originally built soon after 1087 by the de Beauchamp family and which later became part of Chicksands Priory. The list of Vicars maintained by the church dates back to 1237. All Saints Church was rebuilt in the 15th century, some parts of it a little earlier, by the families who owned the local manors. The church was extended in the first part of the 16th century. It is Grade I listed.

A toll house stands at the junction with the A603 (Bedford to Sandy road); the house dates from around 1770 and was used to collect tolls from the road users. It is one of only two toll houses that still exist in Bedfordshire.

Cople House, a large manor house, was at southern end of the village, but it was destroyed in a fire in 1971. In 1976 twenty four large homes were built on the site, renamed Woodlands Close, but the original coach house survived the fire and has been restored and converted into three houses.

== Rowlands Manor and the Spencers ==
One of the manors within the parish of Cople was Rowlands, acquired by the Spencer family in 1531 and held by them for several centuries. The Spencer family were a branch of the Northamptonshire Spencers (with whom they shared a coat-of-arms).

Robert Spencer had a daughter, Ann Spencer in 1575.She was known as Ann of Cople and Married Hugh Albon(e) in 1591. The sons of Nicolas Spencer Sr. and the former Mary Gostwick, Nicholas Spencer and his brother Robert both emigrated to America in the 1650s, to Virginia and Maryland respectively. Nicholas served as an agent for his cousin, John Colepeper, 1st Baron Colepeper.

Spencer family members continued to reside in Cople and its environs for many years afterward. "The Spencers' Cople estates," according to the Bedfordshire County Council, "were bought by Francis Brace for the Dowager Duchess of Marlborough, and the manor still was known as Rowlands when part of the Duke of Bedford’s estate at the start of the 19th century."
