= Cuthwulf =

Cuthwulf or Cuthwolf is a masculine Old English given name meaning "famous wolf". It was especially popular among the aristocracy of Wessex and Kent in the 9th century. According to tradition, it was the name of the grandfather of Cynegils, the first Christian king of Wessex. In the Domesday Book and the Liber Exoniensis of 1086, it is spelled Cudulfus, Codulfus, Codolf, Coolle, Cuulf and Covlfus.

It may refer to:

- Cuthwulf (son of Cuthwine), fl. 592–648
- Cuthwulf (bishop of Hereford), fl. 839–857
- Cuthwulf (bishop of Rochester), fl. 868

== See also ==
- Cathwulf (fl. c. 775), Anglo-Saxon writer
