= Chloramination =

Treatment of drinking water

Chloramination is the treatment of drinking water with a chloramine disinfectant. Both chlorine and small amounts of ammonia are added to the water one at a time which react together to form chloramine (also called combined chlorine), a long lasting disinfectant. Chloramine disinfection is used in both small and large water treatment plants.

== Use ==
In the United States, the maintenance of what is called a "residual" of disinfectant that stays in the water distribution system while it is delivered to people's homes is required by the Environmental Protection Agency (EPA).

The EPA regulations give two choices for disinfectant residual — chlorine or chloramine. Many major water agencies are changing to chloramine to better meet current and anticipated federal drinking water regulations and to protect the public health.

== Chlorine versus chloramine ==
There are many similarities between chlorine and chloramine. Both provide effective residual disinfection with minimal risk to public health. Both are toxic to fish and amphibians. Both chlorine and chloramine react with other compounds in the water to form what are called "disinfection byproducts".

The difference is that chlorine forms many byproducts, including trihalomethanes (THM) and haloacetic acids (HAA), whereas chloramine forms a significantly lower amount of THMs and HAAs but also forms N-nitrosodimethylamine (NDMA). One of the principal benefits of chloramine is that its use reduces the overall levels of these regulated contaminants compared to chlorine.

== Adverse effects ==
Chloramine is toxic to fish and amphibians. Chloramine, like chlorine, comes in direct contact with their bloodstream through fish gills and must be removed from water added to aquariums and fish ponds. It must also be removed from water prior to use in dialysis machines, since water comes into direct contact with the bloodstream during treatment. Since the 1980s, most dialysis machines are built with filters to remove chloramines.

Chloramine is generally considered a problem in brewing beer; like chlorine it can react with and change some of the natural plant flavors that make up the beer, and it may slow or alter the yeast. Because chloramine dissipates much more slowly than chlorine from water, beer-makers prefer carbon filtration and / or Campden tablets to neutralize it in the water.

Humans have no trouble digesting chlorine or chloramine at the levels found in public drinking water; this water is not introduced directly into the human bloodstream. In the United States, the United States Environmental Protection Agency set minimum and maximum health-based safe levels for chloramine in drinking water. Elsewhere, similar oversight agencies may set drinking water quality standards for chloramine.

Two home builders filed lawsuits against Moulton Niguel Water District in 2012, (in Orange County CA), arguing that pinhole leaks in copper water piping in their homes was due to faulty water treatment with chloramine. Pinhole leaks cause expensive damage to people's homes, and the builders claim that they must repipe houses at great expense to deal with the problem. Officials observed that only the two builders have filed suit, but as of late 2013 the number of lawsuits had expanded.

Nitrogenous disinfection by-products are liable to convert to nitrosamines by the action of chlorination and chloramination. Other NDBPs include halonitroalkanes, halonitriles, and haloamides.

== Removing monochloramine from water ==
Chloramines should be removed from water for dialysis, aquariums, hydroponic applications, and homebrewing beer. Chloramine must be removed from water prior to use in kidney dialysis machines because it can cause hemolytic anemia if it enters the blood stream. In hydroponic applications, chloramine stunts the growth of plants.

When a chemical or biological process that changes the chemistry of chloramines is used, it falls under reductive dechlorination. Other techniques use physical—not chemical—methods for removing chloramines.

=== Ultraviolet light ===
The use of ultraviolet light for chlorine or chloramine removal is an established technology that has been widely accepted in pharmaceutical, beverage, and dialysis applications. UV is also used for disinfection at aquatic facilities.

=== Ascorbic acid and sodium ascorbate ===
Ascorbic acid (vitamin C) and sodium ascorbate completely neutralize both chlorine and chloramine, but degrade in a day or two, which makes them usable only for short-term applications. SFPUC determined that 1000 mg of vitamin C tablets, crushed and mixed in with bath water, completely remove chloramine in a medium-size bathtub without significantly depressing pH.

=== Activated carbon ===
A 2013 study by the University of Texas at Austin shows that activated carbon removed efficiency up to nearly 90% monochloramine using a 0.75-minute empty bed contact time

In 2021, the Royal Society of Chemistry's study concluded that both ozonation and granular activated carbon was successful in reducing monochloramine.

Activated carbon has been used for chloramine removal long before catalytic carbon, a form of activated carbon, became available; standard activated carbon requires a very long contact time, which means a large volume of carbon is needed. For thorough removal, up to four times the contact time of catalytic carbon may be required.

Most dialysis units now depend on granular activated carbon (GAC) filters, two of which should be placed in series so that chloramine breakthrough can be detected after the first one, before the second one fails. Additionally, sodium metabisulfite injection may be used in certain circumstances.

=== Campden tablets ===
Home brewers use reducing agents such as sodium metabisulfite or potassium metabisulfite (both proprietorially sold as Campden tablets) to remove chloramine from brewing fermented beverages. However, residual sulfite can cause off flavors in beer so potassium metabisulfite is preferred.

=== Sodium thiosulfate ===
A 2022 per-reviewed study published by the Journal of Emerging Supply Chain Clean Energy and Process Engineering demonstrated that sodium thiosulfate is able to reduce chlorine residue by up to 0.4 ppm. Sodium thiosulfate is used to dechlorinate tapwater for aquariums or treat effluent from wastewater treatments prior to release into rivers. The reduction reaction is analogous to the iodine reduction reaction. Treatment of tapwater requires between 0.1 and 0.3 grams of pentahydrated (crystalline) sodium thiosulfate per 10 L of water. Many animals are sensitive to chloramine, and it must be removed from water given to many animals in zoos.

=== Other methods ===
Chloramine, like chlorine, can be removed by boiling and aging. However, time required to remove chloramine is much longer than that of chlorine. The time required to remove half of the chloramine (half-life) from 10 US gallons (38 L; 8.3 imp gal) of water by boiling is 26.6 minutes, whereas the half-life of free chlorine in boiling 10 gallons of water is only 1.8 minutes. Aging may take weeks to remove chloramines, whereas chlorine disappears in a few days.
