= List of United Kingdom locations: Gab-Gan =

The United Kingdom

This is part of the list of United Kingdom locations: a gazetteer of place names in the United Kingdom showing each place's locality and geographical coordinates.

== Gab-Gan ==
Location	Locality	Coordinates (links to map & photo sources)	OS grid reference
Gabalfa	Cardiff	51.49°N 03.21°W	ST1678
Gabhsann bho Dheas	Western Isles	58.43°N 06.40°W	NB4358
Gabhsann bho Thuath	Western Isles	58.44°N 06.38°W	NB4459
Gable Head	Hampshire	50.78°N 00.97°W	SZ7299
Gabroc Hill	East Ayrshire	55.72°N 04.46°W	NS4551
Gadbrook	Surrey	51.20°N 00.28°W	TQ2047
Gaddesby	Leicestershire	52.71°N 00.99°W	SK6813
Gadebridge	Hertfordshire	51.76°N 00.49°W	TL0408
Gadfa	Isle of Anglesey	53.37°N 04.33°W	SH4589
Gadfield Elm	Worcestershire	51.97°N 02.32°W	SO7831
Gadlas	Shropshire	52.92°N 02.93°W	SJ3737
Gadlys	Rhondda, Cynon, Taff	51.70°N 03.46°W	SN9902
Gadshill	Kent	51.40°N 00.45°E	TQ7170
Gaer	City of Newport	51.56°N 03.02°W	ST2986
Gaer-fawr	Monmouthshire	51.67°N 02.81°W	ST4498
Gaerllwyd	Monmouthshire	51.66°N 02.81°W	ST4496
Gaerwen	Isle of Anglesey	53.21°N 04.27°W	SH4871
Gagingwell	Oxfordshire	51.92°N 01.41°W	SP4025
Gaich	Highland	57.30°N 03.64°W	NJ0125
Gailey	Staffordshire	52.68°N 02.13°W	SJ9110
Gailey Wharf	Staffordshire	52.68°N 02.11°W	SJ9210
Gainfield	Oxfordshire	51.65°N 01.50°W	SU3495
Gainford	Durham	54.53°N 01.73°W	NZ1716
Gain Hill	Kent	51.18°N 00.43°E	TQ7046
Gainsborough	Lincolnshire	53.39°N 00.78°W	SK8189
Gainsborough	Suffolk	52.02°N 01.17°E	TM1841
Gainsford End	Essex	51.98°N 00.50°E	TL7235
Gairbh Eilean	Highland	57.45°N 06.60°W	NG238494
Gairloch	Highland	57.72°N 05.69°W	NG8076
Gairlochy	Highland	56.91°N 05.00°W	NN1784
Gairney Bank	Perth and Kinross	56.17°N 03.41°W	NT1299
Gairsay	Orkney Islands	59.08°N 02.97°W	HY441223
Gaisgill	Cumbria	54.43°N 02.55°W	NY6405
Gaitsgill	Cumbria	54.80°N 02.96°W	NY3846
Galadean	Scottish Borders	55.67°N 02.70°W	NT5643
Galashiels	Scottish Borders	55.61°N 02.81°W	NT4936
Gadlys	Flintshire	53.25°N 03.18°W	SJ2174
Gale	Rochdale	53.64°N 02.09°W	SD9417
Galgate	Lancashire	53.98°N 02.79°W	SD4855
Galhampton	Somerset	51.05°N 02.52°W	ST6329
Gallaberry	Dumfries and Galloway	55.12°N 03.63°W	NX9682
Gallan Head	Western Isles	58.23°N 07.03°W	NB047386
Gallantry Bank	Cheshire	53.07°N 02.73°W	SJ5153
Gallatown	Fife	56.13°N 03.14°W	NT2994
Galley Common	Warwickshire	52.51°N 01.54°W	SP3191
Galleyend	Essex	51.69°N 00.48°E	TL7203
Galley Hill	Lincolnshire	53.28°N 00.15°E	TF4479
Galleywood	Essex	51.69°N 00.47°E	TL7102
Galligill	Cumbria	54.79°N 02.39°W	NY7545
Gallin	Perth and Kinross	56.57°N 04.37°W	NN5445
Gallowfauld	Angus	56.56°N 02.92°W	NO4342
Gallowhill	Glasgow	55.78°N 04.25°W	NS5957
Gallowhill	Renfrewshire	55.85°N 04.41°W	NS4965
Gallowhills	Aberdeenshire	57.54°N 01.88°W	NK0751
Gallows Corner	Havering	51.58°N 00.20°E	TQ5390
Gallows Green (Aldham)	Essex	51.89°N 00.78°E	TL9226
Gallows Green (Great Easton)	Essex	51.90°N 00.35°E	TL6226
Gallows Green	Staffordshire	52.96°N 01.89°W	SK0741
Gallows Green	Worcestershire	52.25°N 02.10°W	SO9362
Gallowsgreen	Torfaen	51.74°N 03.07°W	SO2606
Gallows Inn	Derbyshire	52.95°N 01.30°W	SK4740
Gallowstree Common	Oxfordshire	51.51°N 01.02°W	SU6880
Galltair	Highland	57.21°N 05.62°W	NG8120
Galltegfa	Denbighshire	53.10°N 03.34°W	SJ1057
Gallt Melyd (Meliden)	Denbighshire	53.30°N 03.41°W	SJ0680
Gallt-y-foel	Gwynedd	53.13°N 04.12°W	SH5862
Gallypot Street	East Sussex	51.09°N 00.09°E	TQ4735
Galmington	Somerset	51.00°N 03.12°W	ST2123
Galmisdale	Highland	56.87°N 06.13°W	NM4883
Galmpton (Torbay)	Devon	50.39°N 03.56°W	SX8956
Galmpton (South Hams)	Devon	50.24°N 03.85°W	SX6840
Galon Uchaf	Merthyr Tydfil	51.76°N 03.37°W	SO0508
Galphay	North Yorkshire	54.14°N 01.61°W	SE2572
Galston	East Ayrshire	55.59°N 04.39°W	NS4936
Galtrigill	Highland	57.48°N 06.70°W	NG1854
Gam	Cornwall	50.56°N 04.71°W	SX0877
Gamble Hill	Leeds	53.79°N 01.62°W	SE2533
Gamblesby	Cumbria	54.74°N 02.62°W	NY6039
Gambles Green	Essex	51.79°N 00.55°E	TL7614
Gamelsby	Cumbria	54.85°N 03.16°W	NY2552
Gamesley	Derbyshire	53.44°N 01.98°W	SK0194
Gamlingay	Cambridgeshire	52.15°N 00.20°W	TL2352
Gamlingay Cinques	Cambridgeshire	52.15°N 00.21°W	TL2252
Gamlingay Great Heath	Cambridgeshire	52.14°N 00.23°W	TL2151
Gammaton	Devon	51.00°N 04.16°W	SS4825
Gammaton Moor	Devon	50.99°N 04.15°W	SS4924
Gammersgill	North Yorkshire	54.23°N 01.92°W	SE0582
Gamston (Bassetlaw)	Nottinghamshire	53.27°N 00.95°W	SK7076
Gamston (Rushcliffe)	Nottinghamshire	52.92°N 01.10°W	SK6037
Ganarew	Herefordshire	51.84°N 02.69°W	SO5216
Ganders Green	Gloucestershire	51.87°N 02.43°W	SO7020
Gang	Cornwall	50.48°N 04.39°W	SX3068
Ganllwyd	Gwynedd	52.79°N 03.90°W	SH7224
Gannetts	Dorset	50.97°N 02.30°W	ST7919
Gannochy	Perth and Kinross	56.40°N 03.42°W	NO1224
Gansclet	Highland	58.38°N 03.14°W	ND3344
Ganstead	East Riding of Yorkshire	53.79°N 00.26°W	TA1433
Ganthorpe	North Yorkshire	54.12°N 00.96°W	SE6870
Ganton	North Yorkshire	54.17°N 00.49°W	SE9877
Gants Hill	Redbridge	51.57°N 00.06°E	TQ4388
Ganwick Corner	Hertfordshire	51.67°N 00.19°W	TQ2599
