= Inverarity =

Village in Angus, Scotland

Coordinates: 56.585582°N 2.897047°W

- Location within Angus
- OS grid reference: NO450441
- Council area: Angus
- Lieutenancy area: Angus
- Country: Scotland
- Sovereign state: United Kingdom
- Post town: FORFAR
- Postcode district: DD8
- Dialling code: 01307
- Police: Scotland
- Fire: Scottish
- Ambulance: Scottish
- UK Parliament: Angus
- Scottish Parliament: Angus South

Inverarity (Scots pronunciation: [ˌɪnvərˈarɪte]) is a village in Angus, Scotland, on the A90, 6 miles from Forfar and 7 miles from Dundee. The nearest villages are Gateside, Invereighty, Kincaldrum and Gallowfauld. Inverarity used to be in the old county of Forfarshire. Its name means "creek of Arity".

Inverarity's first parish church dates from 1243; a replacement was built in 1754.

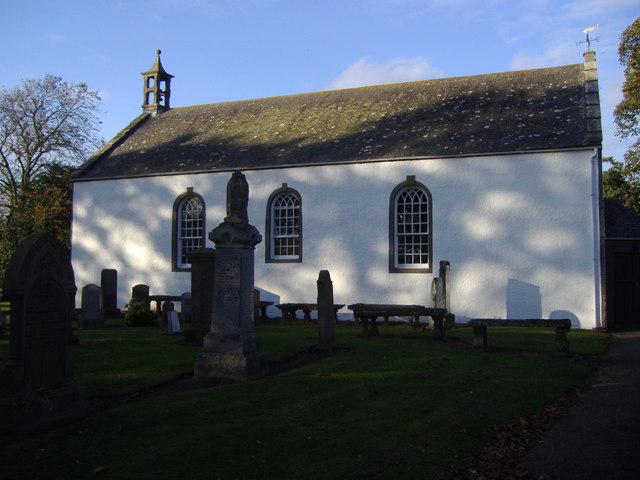
Inverarity Kirk

== See also ==
- List of places in Angus
