= Gateside =

Gateside may refer to:

- Gateside, Fife, Scotland
- Gateside, North Ayrshire, Scotland
- Gateside, Angus, Scotland
- Gateside, Barrhead, a former village now part of the town of Barrhead, East Renfrewshire, Scotland
- Gateside, County Londonderry, a townland in County Londonderry, Northern Ireland
