= John Paterson (missionary) =

Scottish missionary in Scandinavia and the Russian Empire

- Born: 26 February 1776; Duntocher
- Died: 6 July 1855 (aged 79); Kincaldrum, Forfarshire
- Citizenship: UK
- Education: Doctorate in Theology
- Alma mater: Imperial Academy of Åbo
- Occupations: Minister and Missionary
- Years active: 1803-1850
- Employer: Bible Society in Russia
- Organization: London Missionary Society
- Known for: Bible translation in Northern Europe
- Board member of: London Missionary Society
- Spouse(s): Katrine Margarete Hollinder (1809-died 1813); Jane Greig (1817-died 1820)
- Children: 3

John Paterson (1776–1855) was a Scottish missionary in Scandinavia and the Russian Empire. He earned his doctorate from the Imperial Academy of Åbo (Turku) and was instrumental in the operation of the Russian Bible Society for several years eventually being pensioned by Czar Nicholas I. He returned to Edinburgh, where he served as secretary for Scotland of the London Missionary Society.

Paterson served as a missionary in Denmark for three years, Sweden and Finland for five years and Russia for 13 years and helped to translate the Bible into nine languages.

== Life ==
Paterson, third child of George and Isabella Paterson of Duntocher in the parish of Old Kilpatrick, near Glasgow, was born at Duntocher on 26 February 1776, and studied at the University of Glasgow in 1798, although he did not complete his course.

He was attracted by the religious revival which sprang out of the preaching of James Alexander Haldane, and applied for admission into a class formed by the Congregationalists to train young men for the ministry. He was sent to Dundee, and spent the greater part of 1800 there, under the care of W. Innes. Removing to Glasgow, on 5 July 1803 he became the minister of a church which he had formed at Cambuslang, but he relinquished it on 17 June 1804, with the intention of going out as a missionary to India.

Accordingly, on 27 August 1805, accompanied by his friend, Ebenezer Henderson, he sailed for Denmark, with the intention of travelling on to India; but finding it impossible to carry out this intention, they remained in Northern Europe, and became missionaries there; gradually Paterson’s connection with the churches in Edinburgh was dissolved, and he was left to his own resources, mainly through teaching English language classes. He remained in Denmark until after the bombardment of Copenhagen in 1807, when he removed and settled in Stockholm. Here during the next five years he continued his labours among the natives of Scandinavia. The British and Foreign Bible Society afforded him aid in carrying out his plans (though he was at no time the society's salaried agent).

After having helped Finnish Lutheran Archbishop Jacob Tengstrom to establish the Finnish Bible Society in 1811, he removed to St. Petersburg, and on 1 November 1817 he received the degree of doctor of theology from the Imperial Academy of Åbo (Turku) in the Grand Duchy of Finland. In 1822 he withdrew from the British and Foreign Bible Society, and Prince Galitzin and other friends in St. Petersburg requested him to conduct the affairs of the Russian Bible Society. Emperor Alexander I of Russia granted him an annual salary of six thousand roubles. On the death of the emperor the party in power raised objections to the circulation of the scriptures. Ultimately, in 1825, the Emperor Nicholas issued ukases suspending the operations of the Bible Society, and placing the society under the control of the Greek church. Thereupon Paterson left Russia; but the emperor treated him with great kindness, and continued to him his pension for life. During his residence in Northern Europe he was connected with the work of translating and printing portions of the scriptures into Finnish, Georgian, Icelandic, Lapponese, Latvian, Romanian, Russ, Samogitian, and Swedish.

On returning home he settled in Edinburgh, and served for many years as secretary for Scotland of the London Missionary Society, also acting as chairman of the committee of the Congregational Union. In Edinburgh he lived at 11 Salisbury Place in the South Side.

In 1850 he moved to Dundee, where he occasionally preached.

== Family ==
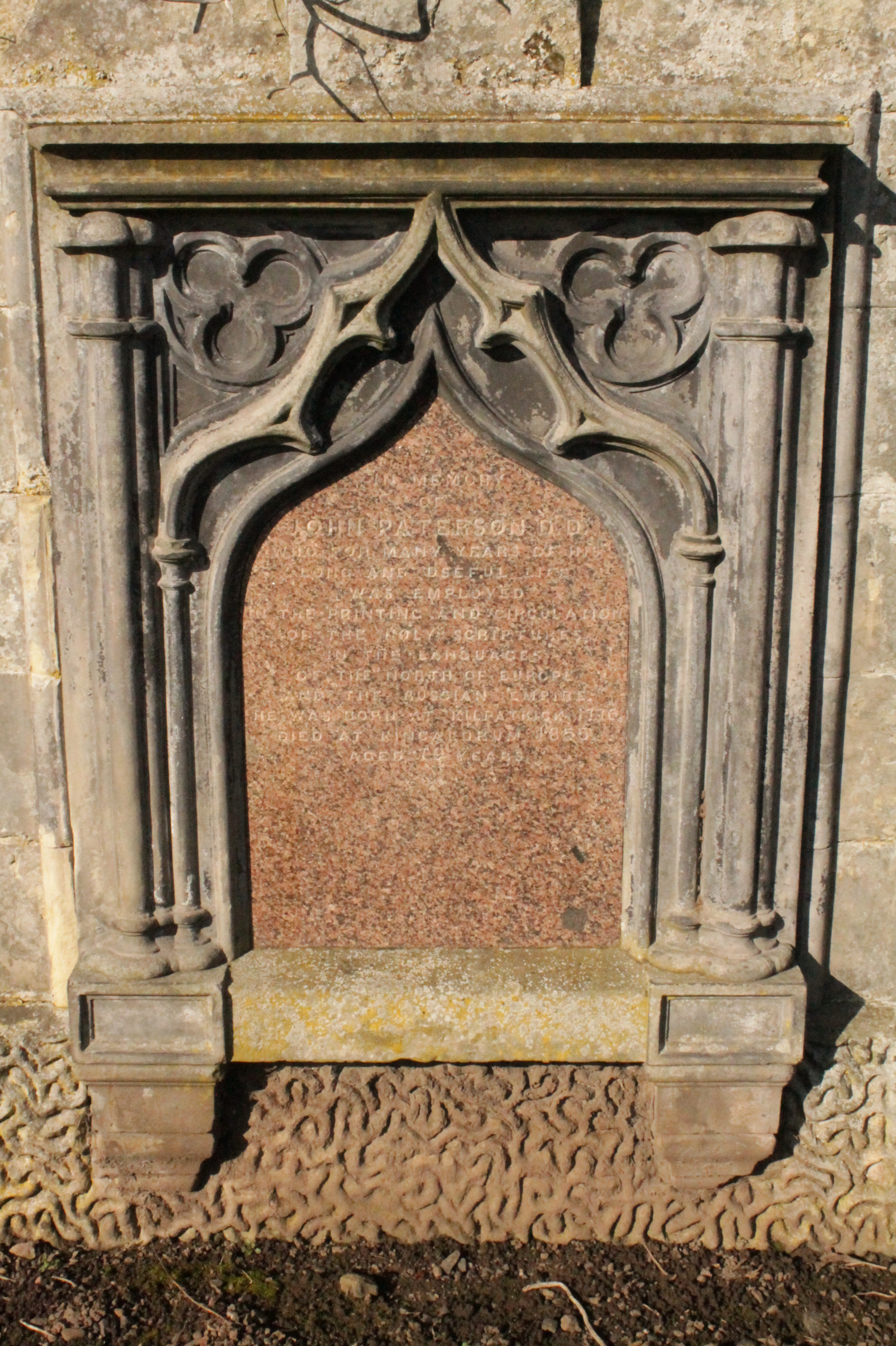
The grave of John Paterson, Western Cemetery, Dundee

He married, first, at Stockholm, on 31 August 1809, Katrine Margarete Hollinder, who died 7 March 1813, leaving two children, George and Catherine; Dr. George, born 18 March 1811, became congregational minister at Tiverton.

Paterson married, secondly, on 19 April 1817, Jane Greig, daughter of Admiral Samuel Greig, of the Russian navy; she was born in Russia on 26 October 1783, and, from her knowledge of Russian dialects, was of much help to her husband in his work at St. Petersburg. She died on 19 January 1820, leaving a daughter, Jean, who became the wife of Edward Baxter of Kincaldrum.

He died during a visit to his daughter Jean at Kincaldrum, Forfarshire, on 6 July 1855. He is buried in the Western Cemetery, Dundee. The grave lies against the first upper terrace, towards its east end.

== Publications ==
Paterson was the author of:

- ‘A Letter to H. H. Norris, containing Animadversions on his Respectful Letter to the Earl of Liverpool on the Subject of the Bible Society,’ 1823.
- ‘The Book for every Land: Reminiscences of Labour and Adventure in the Work of Bible Circulation in the North of Europe and in Russia.’ Edited, with a ‘Prefatory Memoir,’ by W. L. Alexander, 1858. The ‘Memoir’ is on pp. xi-xxxv.
- "Extracts of Letters from the Rev. John Paterson and the Rev. Ebenezer Henderson during their Respective Tours through the East Sea Provinces of Russia, Sweden, Denmark, Jutland, Holstein, Swedish Pomerania, &c. to Promote the Object of the British and Foreign Bible Society". London 1817 (available online)

== See also ==
Richard Knill
