= Listed buildings in Toppesfield =

Civil Parish in Essex, England

Toppesfield is a village and civil parish in the Braintree District of Essex, England. It contains 41 listed buildings that are recorded in the National Heritage List for England. Of these one is grade I, two are grade II* and 38 are grade II.

This list is based on the information retrieved online from Historic England.

== Key ==
Grade	Criteria
I	Buildings that are of exceptional interest
II*	Particularly important buildings of more than special interest
II	Buildings that are of special interest

== Listing ==
Name	Grade	Location	Type	Completed (Note: The date given is the date used by Historic England as significant for the initial building or that of an important part in the structure's description.)	Date designated	Grid ref. (Note: The grid reference is based on the British national grid reference system, sometimes known as OSGB36, used by the Ordnance Survey.) Geo-coordinates	Notes	Entry number (Note: The "List Entry Number" is a unique number assigned to each listed building and scheduled monument by Historic England.)	Image	Wikidata
Barn Approximately 30 Metres South East of Hoses Farmhouse	II				29 August 1984	TL7378036063; 51°59′45″N 0°31′47″E		1122991	Upload Photo	Q26416089
Cust Hall	II				21 June 1962	TL7363436424; 51°59′57″N 0°31′40″E		1317406	Upload Photo	Q26603638
Elms Farmhouse	II				9 June 1981	TL7264938006; 52°00′49″N 0°30′52″E		1338020	Upload Photo	Q26622370
Gainsford End Windmill	II		tower mill		27 October 1988	TL7262835032; 51°59′13″N 0°30′45″E		1317300	Gainsford End Windmill More images	Q5517312
Hill Farmhouse	II				21 June 1962	TL7291236135; 51°59′48″N 0°31′02″E		1122990	Upload Photo	Q26416088
Hoses Farmhouse	II				7 August 1952	TL7375636104; 51°59′46″N 0°31′46″E		1165263	Upload Photo	Q26458752
Hurrell's Farmhouse	II				29 August 1984	TL7294336096; 51°59′47″N 0°31′04″E		1165277	Upload Photo	Q26458765
Quy's Farmhouse	II				29 August 1984	TL7309338444; 52°01′03″N 0°31′16″E		1338021	Upload Photo	Q26622371
Thurston's Farmhouse	II				29 August 1984	TL7106536394; 51°59′59″N 0°29′26″E		1165283	Upload Photo	Q26458771
The Post Office	II	1, Church Lane			29 August 1984	TL7385037443; 52°00′29″N 0°31′54″E		1338023	Upload Photo	Q26622373
Church Farmhouse	II	Church Lane			29 August 1984	TL7393437477; 52°00′30″N 0°31′58″E		1122994	Upload Photo	Q26416092
Parish Church of St Margaret of Antioch	I	Church Lane	church building		21 June 1962	TL7396337447; 52°00′29″N 0°32′00″E		1165328	Parish Church of St Margaret of Antioch More images	Q17536014
Quy's Cottage	II	Gainesford End			29 August 1984	TL7261335606; 51°59′31″N 0°30′45″E		1317375	Upload Photo	Q26603607
Gainsford Hall	II	Gainsford End			21 June 1962	TL7235934984; 51°59′12″N 0°30′31″E		1317343	Upload Photo	Q26603578
Mill House	II	Gainsford End			29 August 1984	TL7249835129; 51°59′16″N 0°30′39″E		1165345	Upload Photo	Q26458833
Providence Cottage	II	Gainsford End			29 August 1984	TL7262935692; 51°59′34″N 0°30′46″E		1122995	Upload Photo	Q26416093
Pump Cottage	II	Gainsford End			29 August 1984	TL7266435699; 51°59′34″N 0°30′48″E		1338024	Upload Photo	Q26622374
Woodleys Farmhouse	II	Gainsford End			29 August 1984	TL7216935033; 51°59′13″N 0°30′21″E		1122996	Upload Photo	Q26416094
Barn Approximately 50 Metres South of Olivers Farmhouse	II	Mately 50 Metres South Of Olivers Farmhouse, Great Yeldham Road			29 August 1984	TL7450036699; 52°00′05″N 0°32′26″E		1122998	Upload Photo	Q26416095
Meads Farm Cottages	II	Great Yeldham Road			29 August 1984	TL7475837282; 52°00′23″N 0°32′41″E		1165373	Upload Photo	Q26458860
Olivers Farmhouse	II*	Great Yeldham Road			7 August 1952	TL7448036750; 52°00′06″N 0°32′25″E		1122997	Upload Photo	Q17557235
Toppesfield Hall	II	Great Yeldham Road			7 August 1952	TL7457437110; 52°00′18″N 0°32′31″E		1338025	Upload Photo	Q26622375
Barn Approximately 20 Metres North West of Le Hurst Farmhouse	II	Harrow Hill			29 August 1984	TL7195336212; 51°59′52″N 0°30′12″E		1317319	Upload Photo	Q26603556
Bradfields	II*	Harrow Hill			7 August 1952	TL7259736555; 52°00′02″N 0°30′46″E		1122999	Upload Photo	Q17557240
Le Hurst Farmhouse	II	Harrow Hill			29 August 1984	TL7197936197; 51°59′51″N 0°30′13″E		1338026	Upload Photo	Q26622376
Meekings Farmhouse	II	Harrow Hill			29 August 1984	TL7194236277; 51°59′54″N 0°30′12″E		1165387	Upload Photo	Q26458874
Little Thatches	II	Mallows Lane			29 August 1984	TL7271535519; 51°59′29″N 0°30′51″E		1317328	Upload Photo	Q26603564
Numbers 1 and 2 Berkley Cottages	II	1 and 2 Berkley Cottages, Stambourne Road			17 December 1998	TL7342038159; 52°00′53″N 0°31′32″E		1033373	Upload Photo	Q26284856
Willowdene	II	1, Stambourne Road			29 August 1984	TL7377037459; 52°00′30″N 0°31′49″E		1165427	Upload Photo	Q26458911
Corona Cottages	II	18-22, Stambourne Road			29 August 1984	TL7378237502; 52°00′31″N 0°31′50″E		1123000	Upload Photo	Q26416096
Grass Green Farmhouse	II	Stambourne Road			29 August 1984	TL7350238291; 52°00′57″N 0°31′37″E		1338027	Upload Photo	Q26622377
Orchard House	II	1, The Causeway			7 December 1976	TL7390537308; 52°00′25″N 0°31′56″E		1165297	Upload Photo	Q26458788
Pump in Yard to Rear of Berwick Hall, Approximately 8 Metres West of Main Range	II	Approximately 8 Metres West Of Main Range, The Causeway			29 August 1985	TL7353937244; 52°00′23″N 0°31′37″E		1165291	Upload Photo	Q26458779
Long Cottage	II	51, The Causeway			8 March 1974	TL7383137013; 52°00′16″N 0°31′52″E		1122993	Upload Photo	Q26416091
The Cottage	II	59, The Causeway			29 August 1984	TL7383136963; 52°00′14″N 0°31′52″E		1165315	Upload Photo	Q26458807
Berwick Hall	II	The Causeway			7 August 1952	TL7355137241; 52°00′23″N 0°31′38″E		1122992	Upload Photo	Q26416090
The Old Rectory	II	The Causeway			7 August 1952	TL7375737060; 52°00′17″N 0°31′48″E		1338022	Upload Photo	Q26622372
Teys	II	6, The Street			29 August 1984	TL7385037392; 52°00′28″N 0°31′54″E		1165433	Upload Photo	Q26458917
Toppesfield Stores	II	16, The Street			29 August 1984	TL7385237363; 52°00′27″N 0°31′54″E		1123001	Upload Photo	Q26416097
Two Pumps in Shelter and North End	II	The Street			29 August 1984	TL7386037426; 52°00′29″N 0°31′54″E		1338028	Upload Photo	Q26622378

== See also ==
- Grade I listed buildings in Essex
- Grade II* listed buildings in Essex

== Sources ==
- Bettley, James; Pevsner, Nikolaus (2007) [1954], Essex, The Buildings of England, New Haven and London: Yale University Press, ISBN 978-0-300-11614-4
