= Gainsford =

Gainsford is a surname. The usual medieval spelling was Gaynesford. Notable people with the surname include:

- Anne Gainsford (died c. 1590), lady-in-waiting to Anne Boleyn
- Ian Gainsford (born 1930), British academic
- John Gainsford (1938–2015), South African rugby union player
- Melinda Gainsford-Taylor (born 1971), Australian athlete
- Nicholas Gaynesford (c. 1427–1498), British politician
- Thomas Gainsford (died 1624), British author and editor

== Other uses ==
- Gainsford End, a hamlet in Toppesfield, England
- Gainsford, Queensland, a locality in the Central Highlands Region, Australia
