= Gainsford End Mill, Toppesfield =

Windmill in Toppesfield, Essex, England

Toppesfield Mill

Origin
- Mill name: Gainsford End Mill
- Mill location: TL 726 350
- Coordinates: 51°59′17″N 0°30′43″E
- Operator(s): Private
- Year built: 1869

Information
- Purpose: Corn mill
- Type: Tower mill
- Storeys: Five storeys
- No. of sails: Four sails
- Type of sails: Patent sails
- Windshaft: Cast iron
- Winding: Fantail
- Fantail blades: Eight blades
- No. of pairs of millstones: Three pairs
- Size of millstones: 4 feet 6 inches (1.37 m) and 4 feet 4 inches (1.32 m)

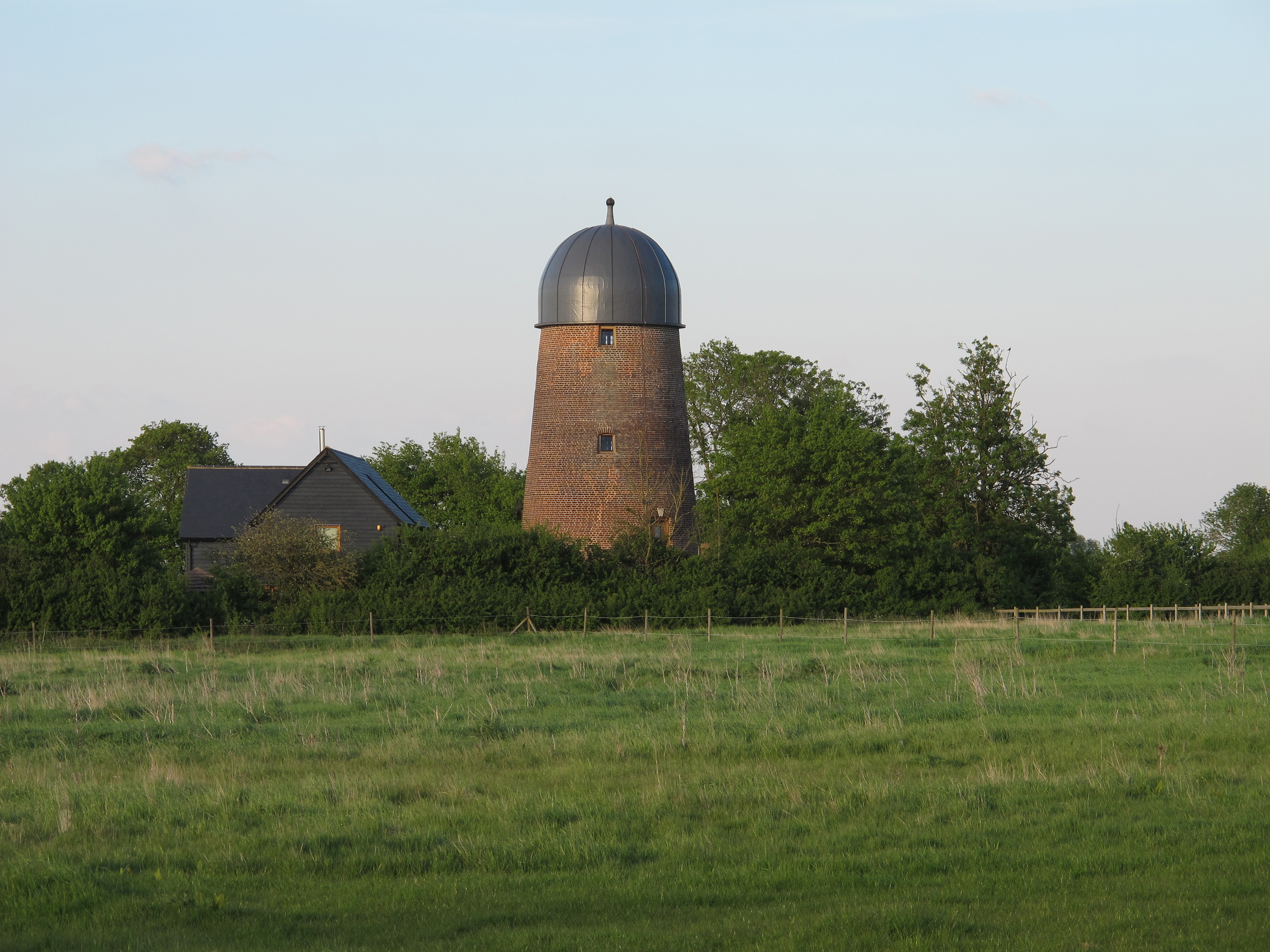
View of Gainsford End Windmill

Gainsford End Mill is a grade II listed tower mill at Gainsford End, near Toppesfield, Essex, England, which has been converted to a residence.

== History ==
Gainsford End Mill was built in 1869 at a cost of £2000. It replaced a post mill which had stood on the site since the late eighteenth century. The mill was working until c. 1928 and afterwards became derelict. The windshaft was installed in Duck End Mill, Finchingfield, when that mill was restored in 1958, although it was removed when a new wooden windshaft was fitted to that mill in 1986. It was converted to residential use in 2007.

== Description ==
Gainsford End Mill is a five-storey brick tower mill with a domed cap winded by an eight-bladed Fantail. When built it had four Patent sails carried on a cast-iron windshaft. The brake wheel drove a cast-iron wallower carried on a 5-inch-diameter (130 mm) cast-iron upright shaft. The 6-foot-4-inch-diameter (1.93 m) great spur wheel drove three pairs of millstones. The tower is 20 feet (6.10 m) diameter at the base with walls 2 feet (610 mm) thick The tower is 40 feet (12.19 m) high, and the mill was 50 feet (15.24 m) to the top of the cap. The mill drove three pairs of millstones; two pairs were 4 feet 4 inches (1.32 m) diameter and the third pair were 4 feet 6 inches (1.37 m) diameter.

== Millers ==
- Lewis Steward 1874 - 1898
- Joseph Chaplin 1902
