= Church of St Mary the Virgin, Gamlingay =

Church in Cambridgeshire, England

Coordinates: 52°09′18″N 0°11′14″W

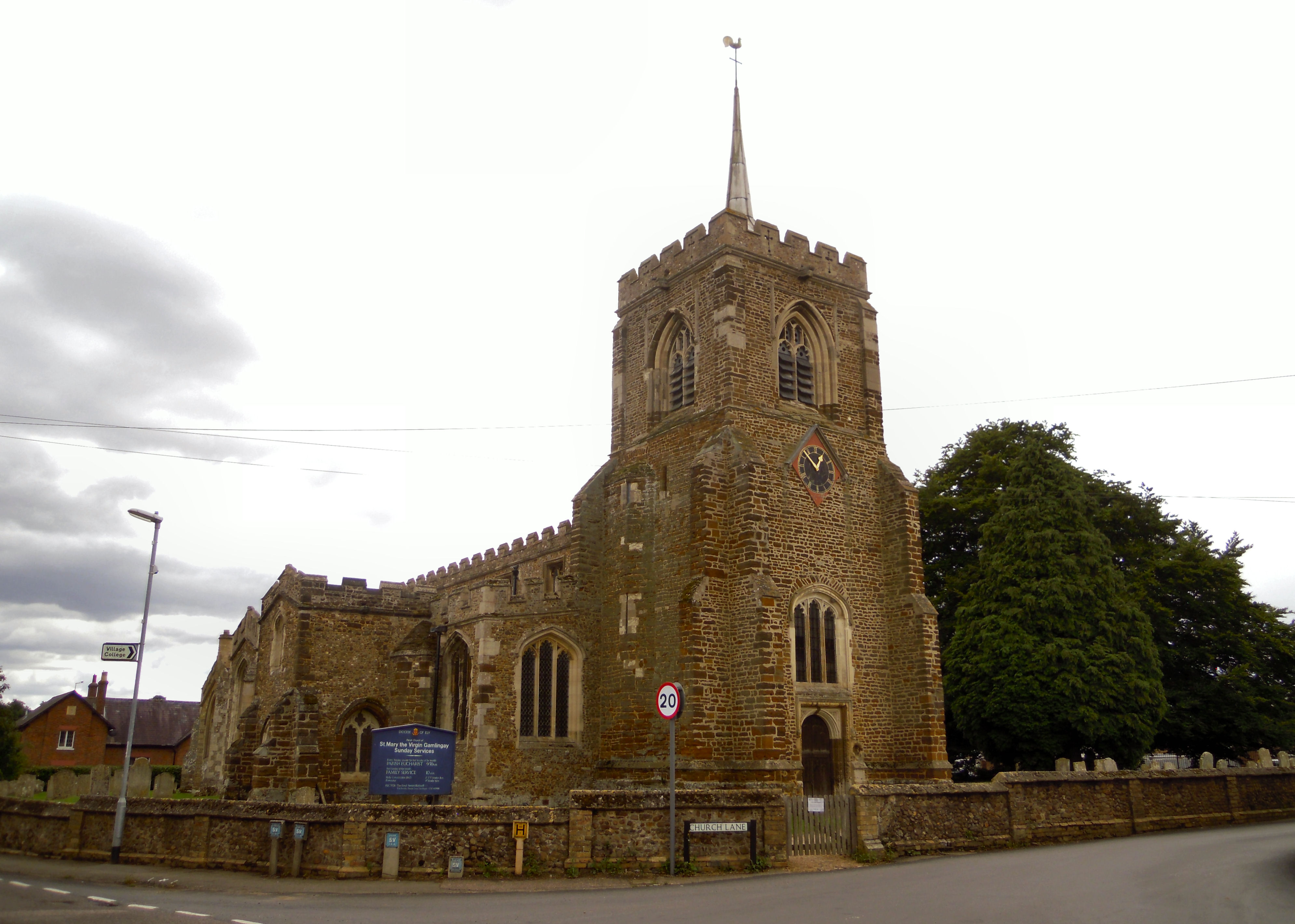
Church of St Mary the Virgin, Gamlingay

The Church of St Mary the Virgin is the parish church for the village of Gamlingay in Cambridgeshire and is dedicated to St Mary the Virgin. Gamlingay is part of the ecclesiastical parish of Gamlingay with Hatley St George and East Hatley. The church is mainly 13th-century with extensive rebuilding in the 14th and 15th centuries. It has been a Grade I listed building since 1967 and comes under the St Neots Deanery in the Diocese of Ely. Nikolaus Pevsner in 1954 described the church as "... the most impressive church in this part of the county."

== Design ==
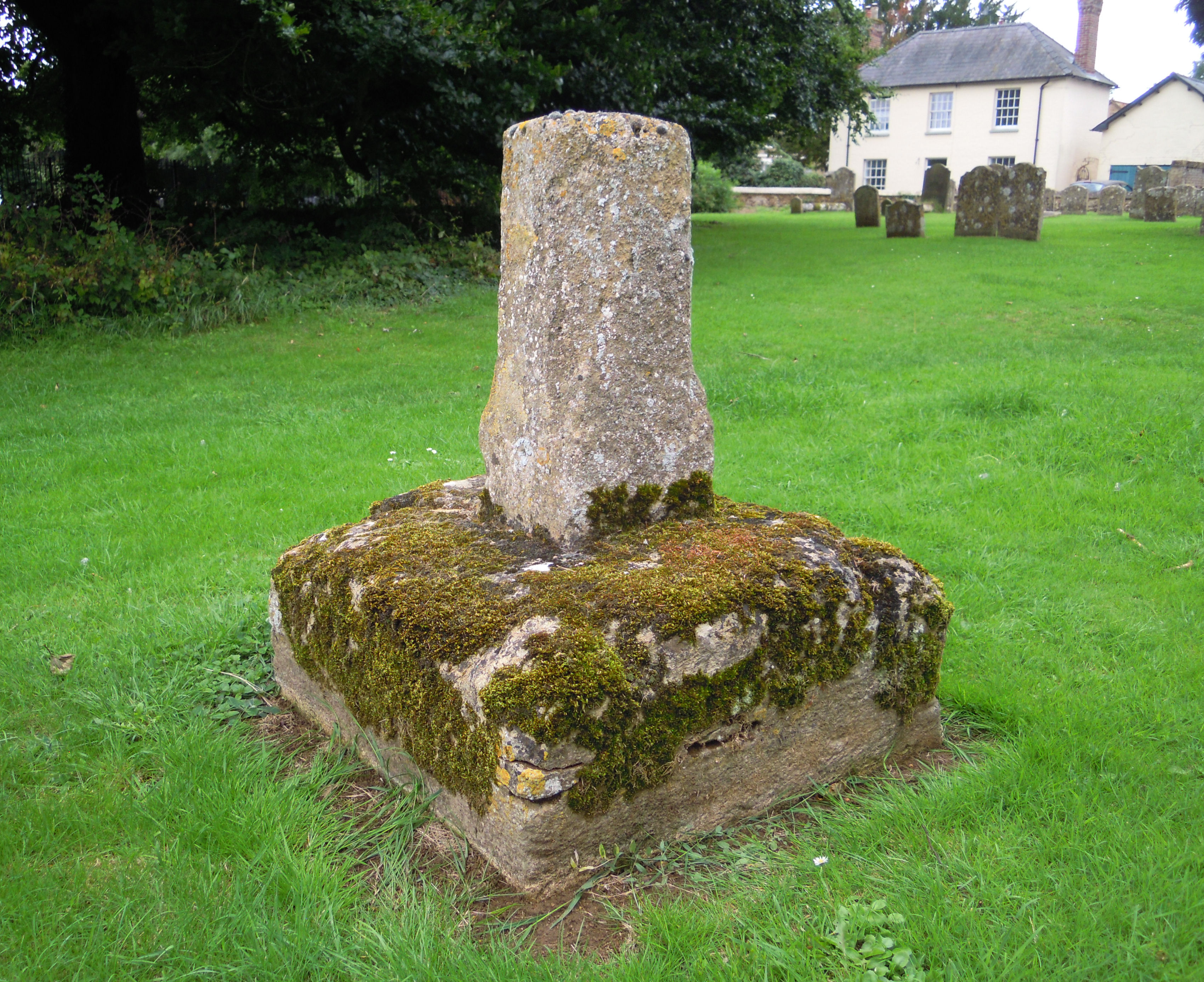
The mediaeval cross in the churchyard was demolished by Puritan William Dowsing in 1643

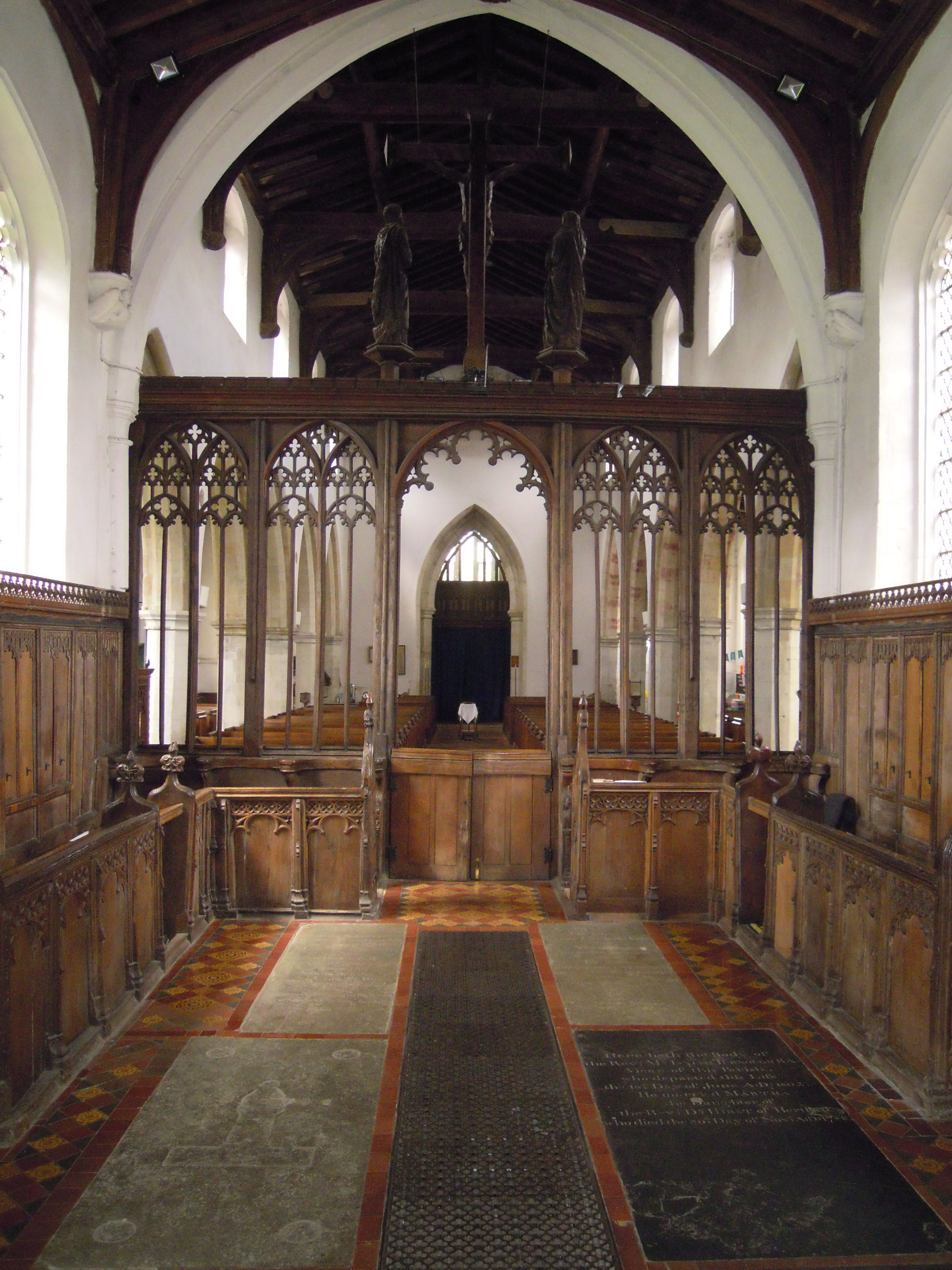
View from the chancel towards the rear of the rood screen and facing the seats of 1442

A church existed in the parish before 1120 but what can be seen today is no earlier than the 13th-century: this includes the South and North nave arcades, the North aisle and the chancel. St Mary's church is built in the Early English style with a square tower (now containing eight bells) from fieldstones and local ironstone. The South aisle and South chapel date to about 1300 while the North porch is also a 14th-century addition. Remodelling of the church in the 15th and 16th centuries affected the entire building except for the nave arcades.

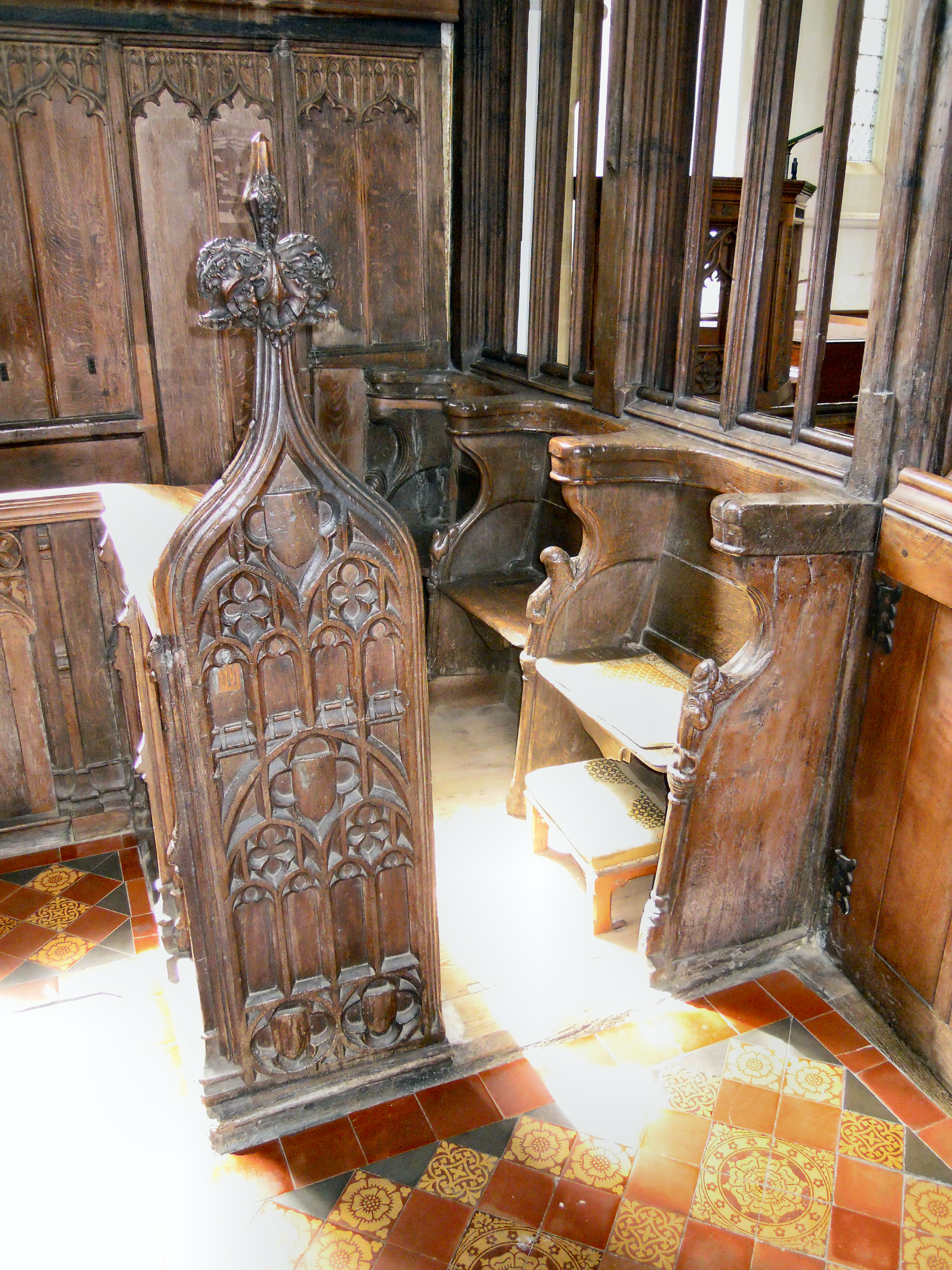
The seats in the chancel date to about 1442

The West tower is 13th-century in origin and was largely rebuilt in the 14th and 15th centuries. The tower is in two heights divided by a string course at the base of the belfry, which has an embattled parapet. Above each tower window is a gargoyle. The doorway to the stair turret can be found inside the church at the East end of the North wall with the stairs ascending to the bell chamber. On the East face of the tower the line of an earlier steep-pitched nave roof is still visible. The acute spire is a modern replacement while the cross tree is original. The ground stage of the East wall of the tower is unusually thick and the tower arch is rather oddly contrived; earlier walling has possibly been encased.

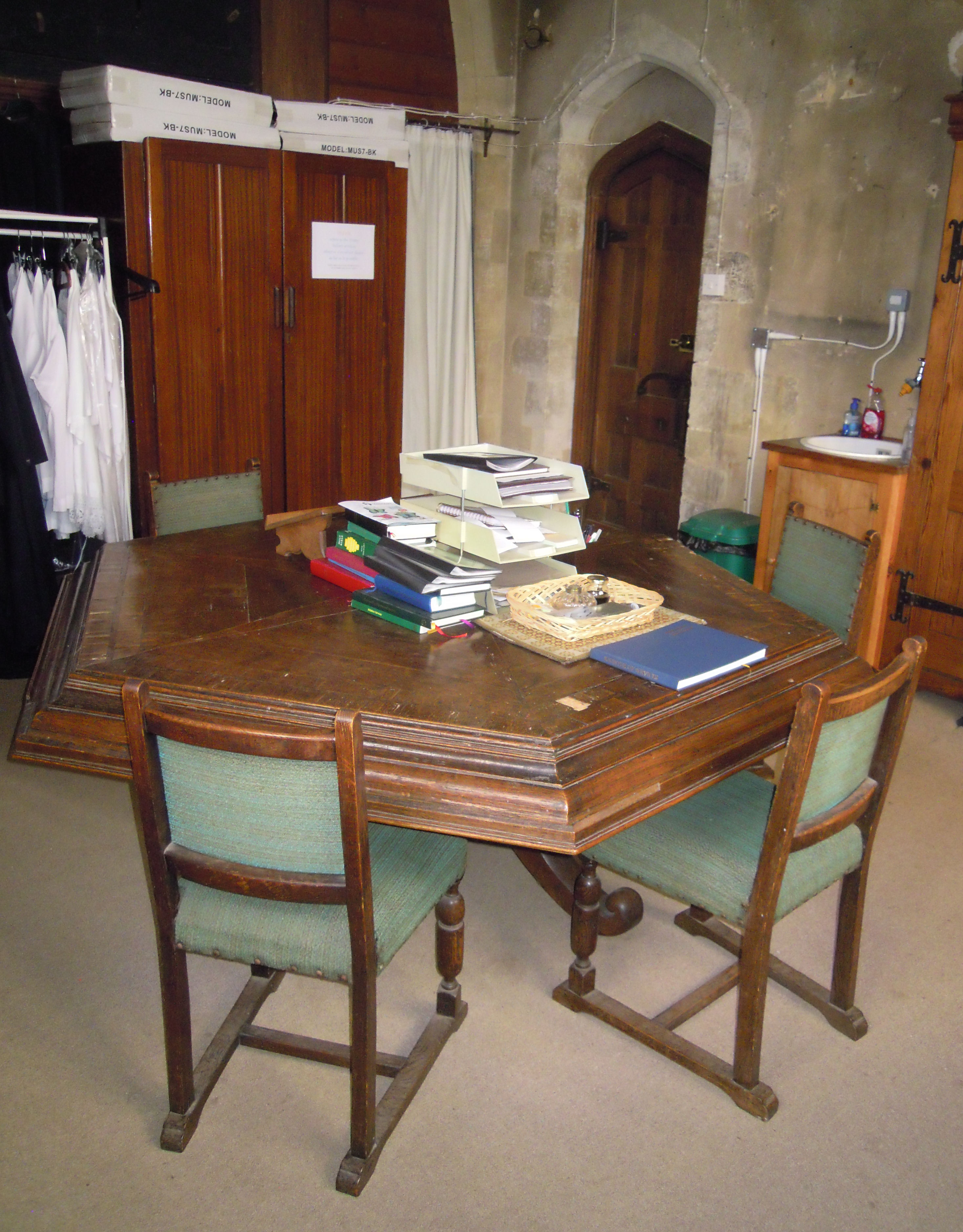
The vestry table is probably made from a pulpit sounding board

The present vestry dates from the 1880 restoration while the unusual shape of the vestry table leads us to believe it may be the sounding board of the pulpit prior to that presently used, the old pulpit having come from Ely House in Holborn.

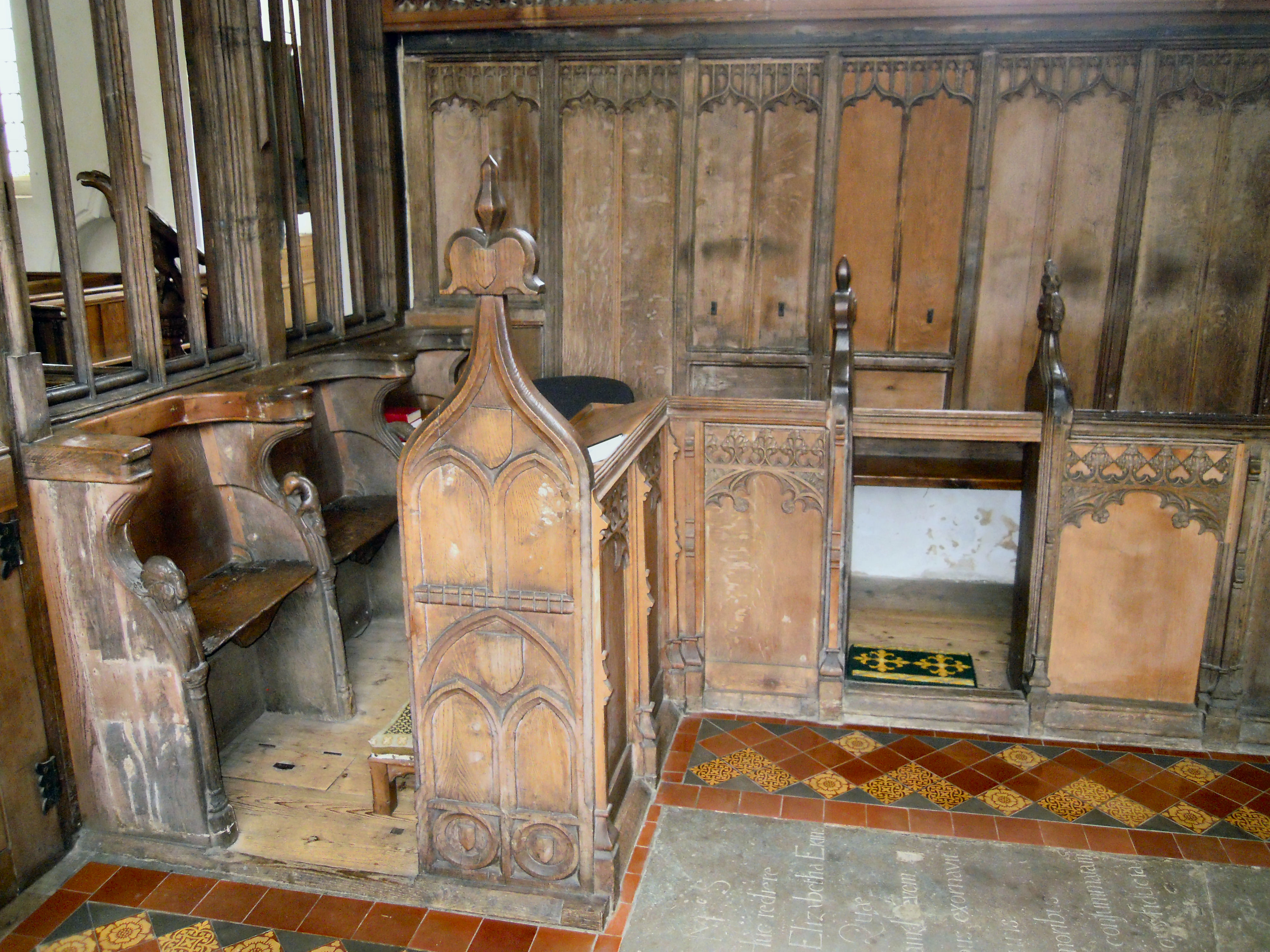
The seats in the chancel date to about 1442

The chancel with its chamfered plinth and embattled parapet is typically 13th-century in design and scale while much of the detail dates to 1442–43 when Merton College, Oxford, who were part patrons, spent 151s 2d on repairs to the chancel. The South transept chapel was remodelled between 1460 and 1490 by the guilds of The Guild of the Blessed Trinity and the Gamlingay Guild while the 14th-century North transeptal chapel was remodelled at the expense of Walter Taylard (d. 1466) who was Merton College's steward in Gamlingay and who may have been a descendant of the founder's sister. The consecration of the high altar and an altar on the North side of the church by Bishop John Alcock in 1490 may point to when these alterations were finished.

The 19th-century and later repairs include a major restoration in 1880 when the vestry and South porch were rebuilt to the design of J. P. St Aubyn. Among the church fittings are a reredos (not in situ) and other items from a bequest made by William Meadston of Woodbury (d. 1683). The chancel has a group of grotesque gargoyles: two on the North side and two at the East end; a smaller fifth gargoyle below the apex of the East gable supports an attached shaft for the gable cross. The 14th-century chancel arch is of two orders, chamfered to the East and with the outer order dying against the side walls. The nave has a North arcade of five bays with arches of two chamfered orders standing on octagonal piers with moulded caps and bases. The nave is pierced by a squint to the chancel.

The North aisle is of four bays with the East bay of the arcade leading into the North chapel. The West wall was partially rebuilt in the 15th century. The aisle has four windows, three of which, including the West window, are late mediaeval. At the East end of the long wall is the West half of a 13th-century tomb recess; the East half of the recess was demolished with the rest of the wall when the North chapel was built. The North chapel has two 15th-century windows while a two-centred arch between the North chapel and the aisle probably dates to the 14th century. The South porch was rebuilt during the restoration of 1880 and is late mediaeval in design. It has an embattled parapet with modern side windows. The roofs of the nave, its aisles and the two chapels are late mediaeval. The chancel roof is modern but is supported on eight 15th-century corbels carved as half angels holding blank shields.

The stoup outside and immediately to the South of the West door with a projecting broken bowl is late mediaeval. The sundial in the South wall of the chancel and incised on a block of clunch is also mediaeval. In the churchyard South of the church are the remains of a medieval cross consisting of a square base with angle stops and the bottom of shaft, square to octagonal. This was used in medieval times for preaching sermons and was destroyed following a visit from William Dowsing on 16 March 1643 because it was considered idolatrous. The church has a number of stone coffin lids including in the North porch built into stone benches; various other fragments can be found about the church.

== Fittings ==
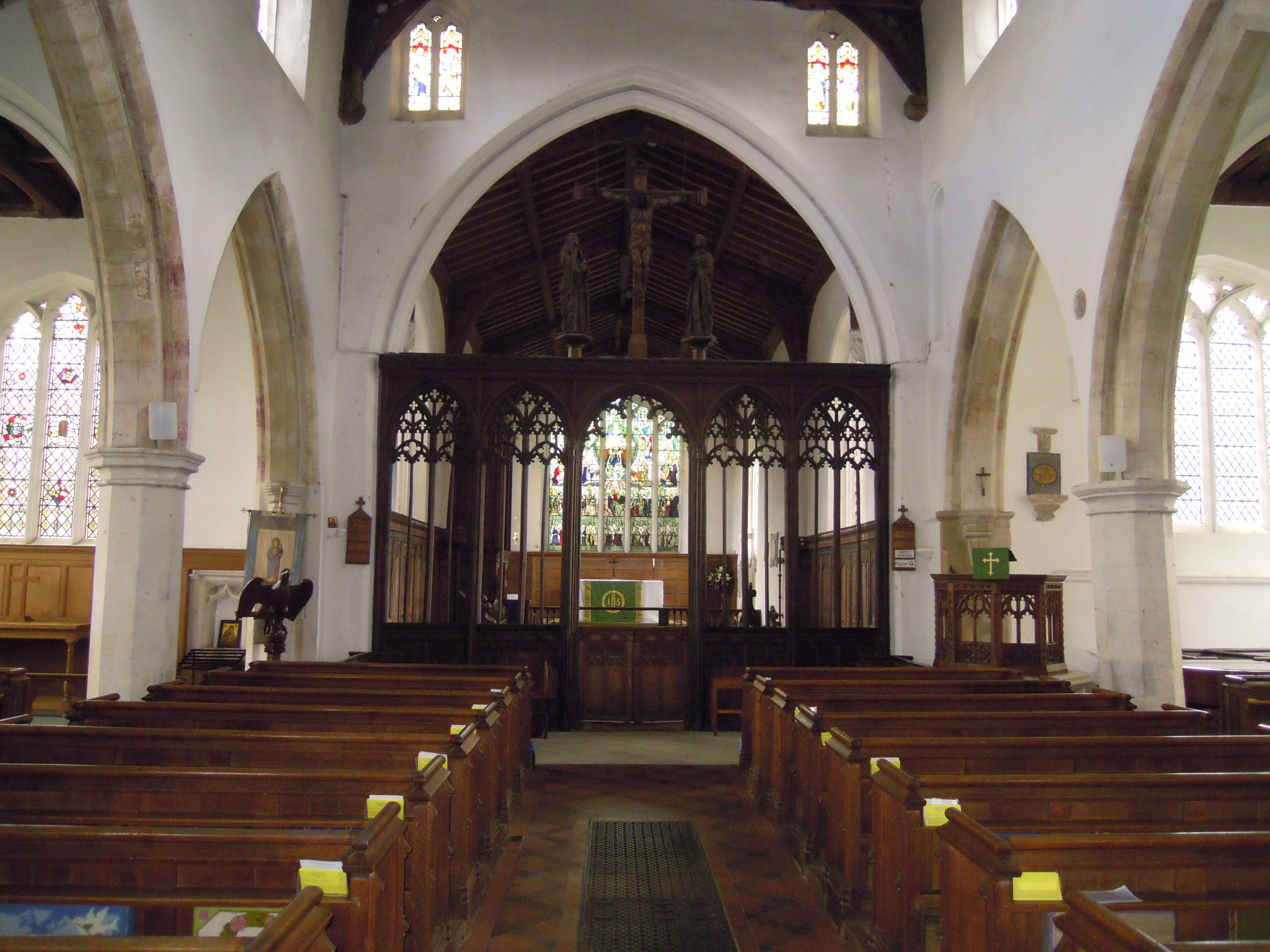
View up the nave showing the rood screen

The rood screen is mainly late medieval, and is in five bays with the extra-wide middle bay being the entry. It has been much altered. The oldest parts are thought to have been in position after the restoration in the 1480s. Traces of the medieval paint colours of red, green, cream and gold still remain. At that time there would have been a small winding staircase (a vice) leading up to the top of the screen from behind the present pulpit. The doorway to the screen is still visible but the vice was bricked up in the Reformation. However the remains of the first few steps of the vice can be seen besides the modern pulpit. The cornice infilling above the heads of the lights and gates are modern. In the north chapel can be found three remodelled pews, with an additional pew-end incorporated into modern seating. In the south chapel can be found two blocks of seating, each of four pews, similar to the seating in the north chapel but with original panelled fronts to the first pews. Nearby at the east end of the south aisle is a third panelled front incorporated into modern seating. With the exception of the first these seats are late medieval.

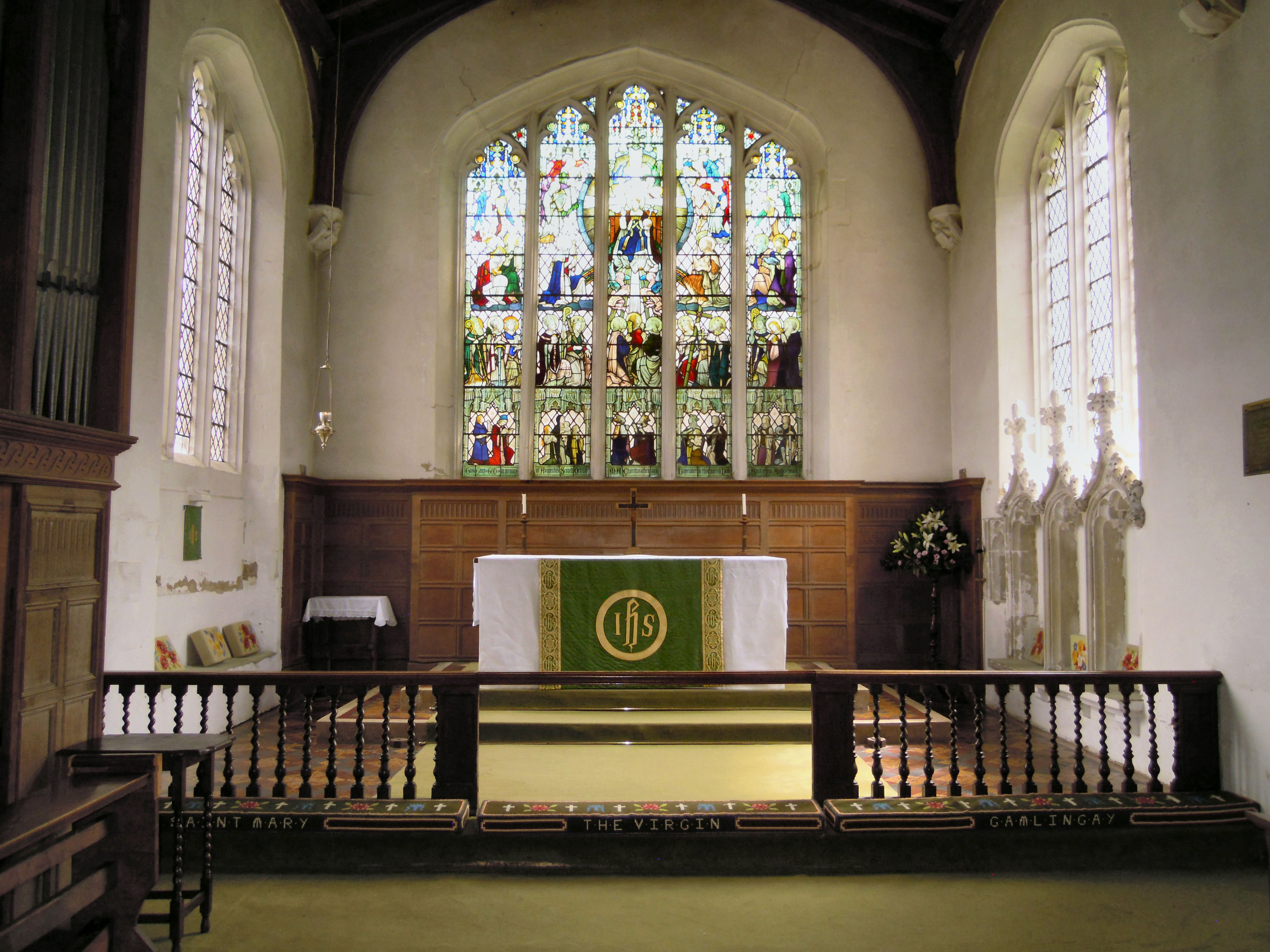
The Sanctuary with the high altar

The sedilia in the chancel are believed to be 19th-century apart from the 15th-century moulded jambs. The stalls or pews inside the east side of the rood screen – three on either side of the opening – have shaped and moulded divisions and curved and moulded cappings. It is believed that these seats were brought to the church from another site. It is known that they were re-positioned during the 1880 restoration from the south wall of the chancel. They may well have been for the six priests known to be in the village in 1490. The carvings on the seats on the north side are: modern; a mitred ecclesiastic; a collared animal; a bird with long wings and turned-back head. On the south side: an angel; a winged beast; an animal (mutilated); a defaced head. The two seats either side of the entry have misericords carved, with on the north side a crouching man and a demon's head, while on the south side an ape and grapes in vine leaves. With the exception of the first these carvings possibly date to about 1442.

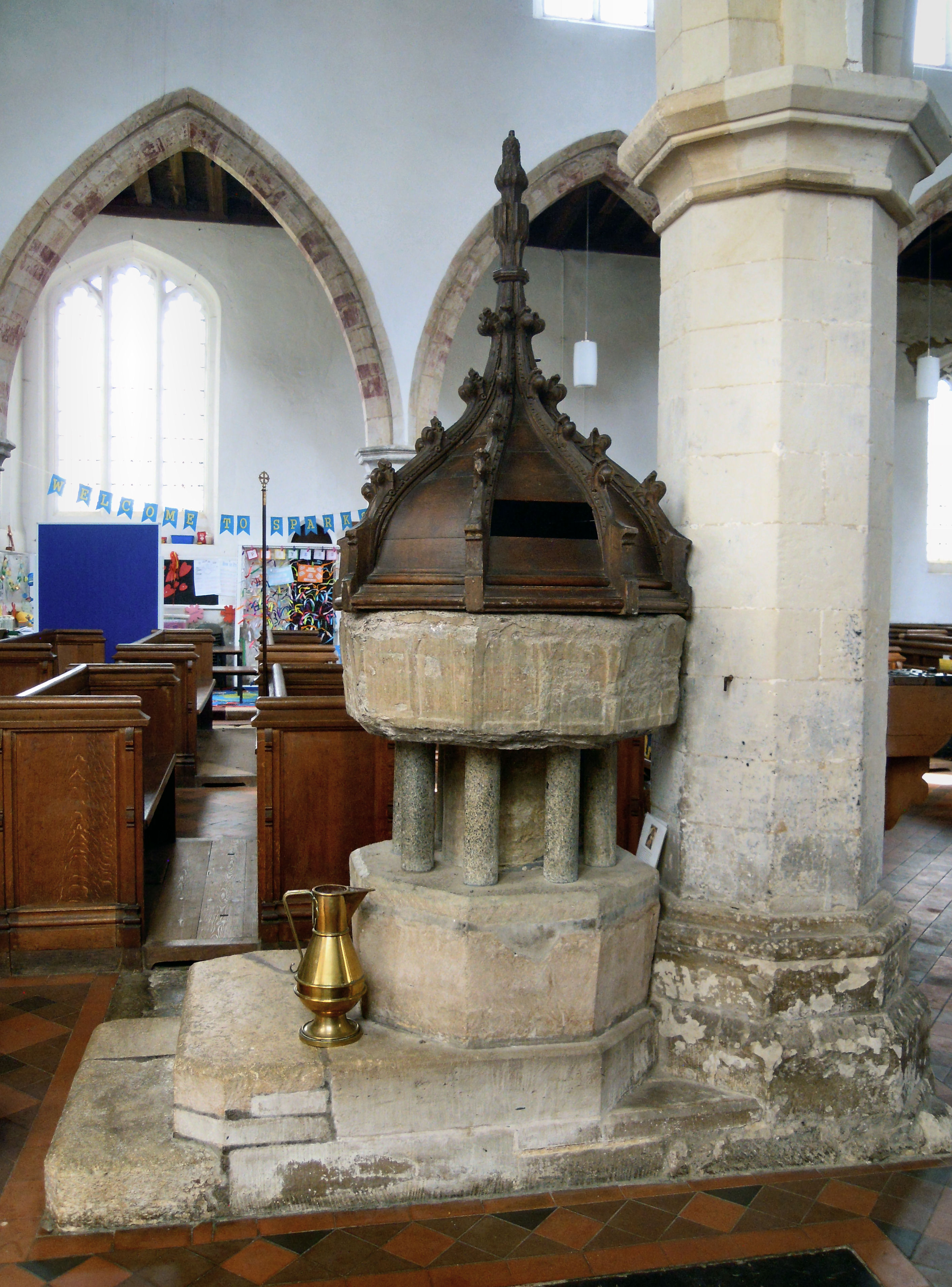
The 13th-century baptismal font

The church has six bells with the 2nd, 3rd and 6th by Miles Graye dated 1653, while the rest are either modern or recast. The bell frame has four pits probably dating to about 1490 when Bishop John Alcock blessed two new bells in the church. The church has a number of brass indents with one in the chancel being of a cleric, with an inscription plate and roundels at the corners. In the nave under the third arch of the north arcade is another of a man and his wife, with an inscription plate. Under the second arch of the south arcade is another of a man and his wife, with an inscription plate and roundels at the corners. Under the third arch of the south arcade is yet another of a man with his wife with inscription plate below and prayer picture above. In the south aisle at the west end is another very worn example of two figures with scrolls, with an inscription plate below and prayer picture. A sixth example also very worn is of a man and his wife. All are of the 15th or 16th century, set in slabs of limestone marble.

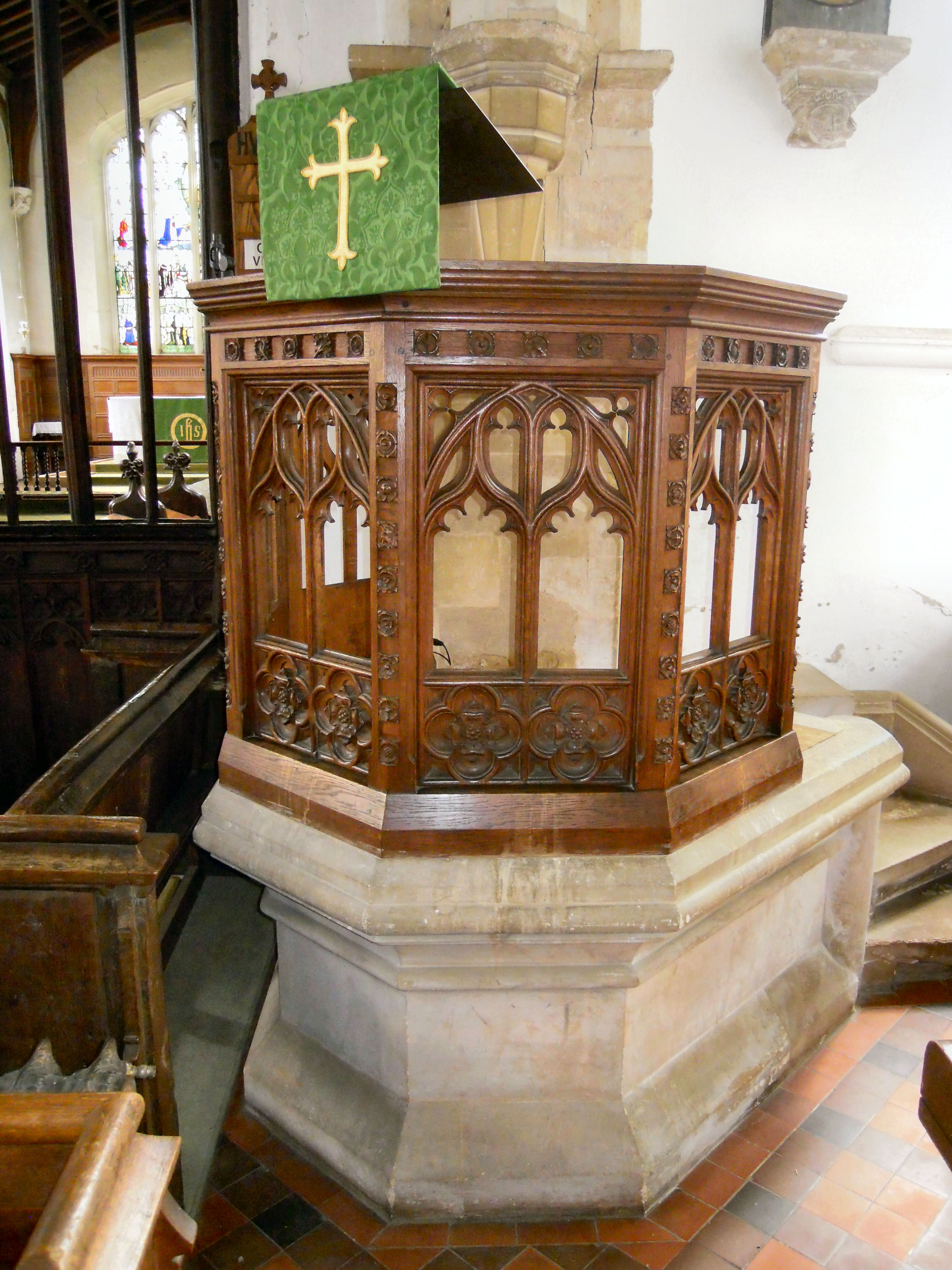
The pulpit dates to the restoration of 1880

In the southwest corner of the nave can be found part of a 13th-century limestone marble slab, with an undeciphered inscription in Lombardic capitals along one margin. The communion rails were fitted at the bequest of William Meadston (died 1683). The door in the ground stage of the tower is formed of two leaves and is late-medieval, and originally was fitted in the west doorway. Prior to the restoration of 1880 there were two baptismal fonts in the church: one in the present position and one in the centre aisle. The present 13th-century font has an octagonal limestone marble bowl with two pointed arched panels in each face. The font's base has a cylindrical central pier with 19th-century peripheral shafts. The font's sub-base possibly incorporates the bowl of the earlier font which may well have been in use in the earliest church on this site. The restored octagonal ogee font cover with crocketed ribs and finial is probably 16th-century.

The church glass in the top of the east window in the south chapel contains reset quarries and fragments from the 15th to 17th centuries, including two small shields of the arms of Fitzjames, possibly those of Richard Fitzjames, Warden of Merton College, Oxford (1483–1507). The locker in the south aisle immediately east of the south door is medieval, and was probably for storing banner staves used for processions and ceremonies. This would indicate the presence of guilds and charities in a thriving community.

== Monuments ==
Two ledger stones – that on the left is to William Spinkes (1701). That on the right retains the recess at centre for a monumental brass

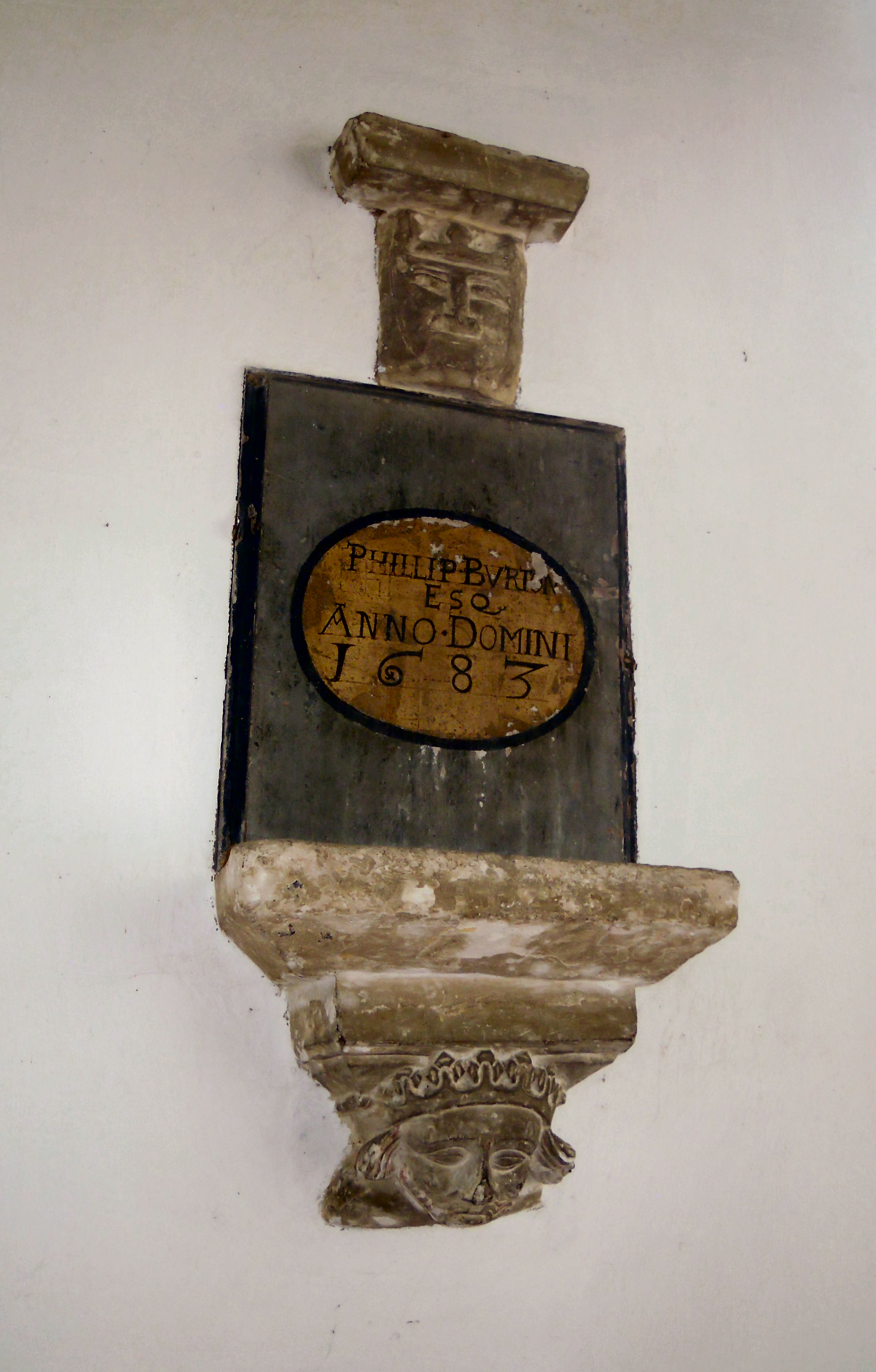
Wooden wall monument to Phillip Burton (died 1683)

In the chancel on the south wall can be found a wall monument to Ann Say of 1793, with an oval inscription panel of white marble against a grey background. In the north aisle wall where it meets the north chapel can be found a mutilated tomb recess with an incomplete moulded trefoil head and a portion of a 13th-century coffin lid with a plain cross. In the south aisle on the south wall is a polychromatic wall monument to Ralph Lane of Woodbury Hall (1732) and his wife Elizabeth (1754). Nearby is another wall monument to their daughter Elizabeth Lane (1717). In the south chapel on the east wall is a small painted wooden panel to Phillip Burton (1683). The church also has a number of ledger stones, with one in the chancel dedicated to Dixie Windsor (1743) with an achievement of arms. A second to Thomas Sclater (1696); a third to Edward Sclater (1688); a fourth to William Meadston (1683) with an achievement of arms; a fifth to Rev. Isaiah T[. . . . . . .] and Ma[. . .] his wife [dates illegible]; a sixth to Elizabeth E[kins] (1702), and a seventh to William S[pin]kes (1701). In the south aisle is another to Elizabeth (Bury) wife of Francis Jermin (1685). The voussoirs of both nave arcades show the traces of medieval painting in red ochre, with that on the north side in particular still being quite distinct.

== Graffiti ==
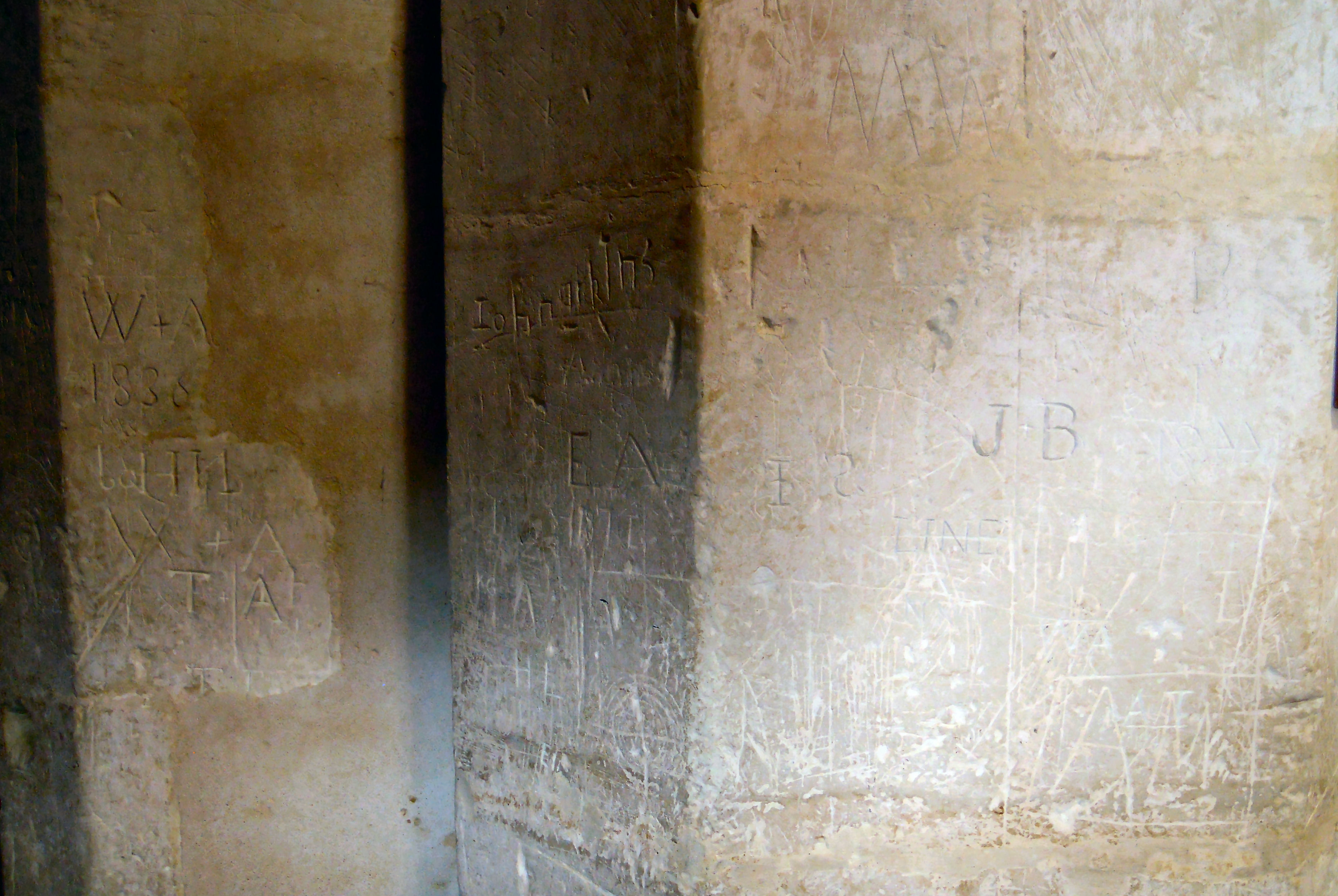
Graffiti of various eras

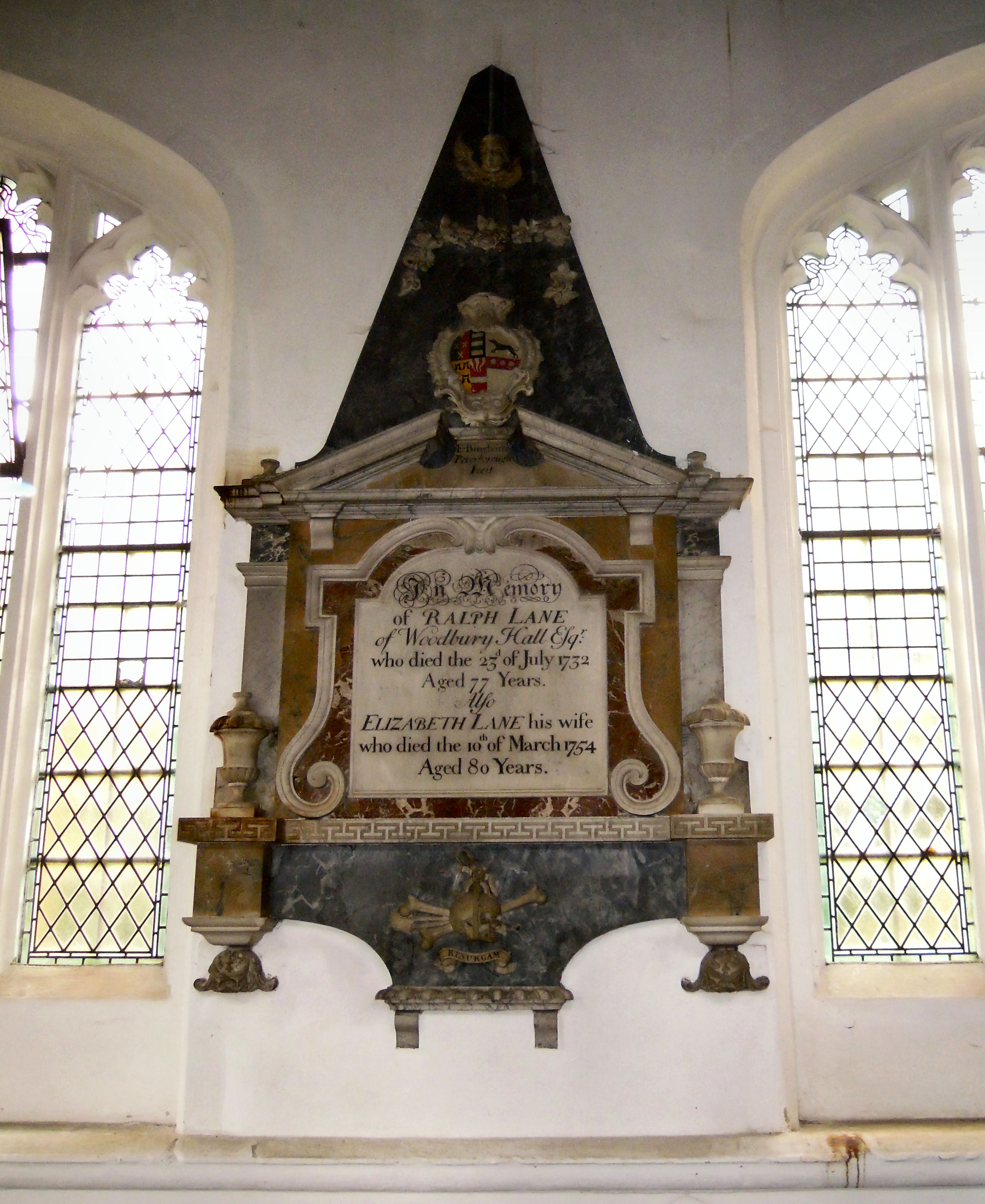
The polychromatic wall monument to Ralph (1732) and Elizabeth Lane (1754)

The church has a great deal of graffiti from various eras. On the first pier of the North arcade in a small 15th-century hand is scratched "hic est sedes Margarete Tayl . . d" (possibly done by Margaret, wife of Walter Taylard who rebuilt the adjoining North chapel). On the third pier of the North arcade can be found a possibly medieval drawing of three small houses perhaps along a street. On the second pier of the South arcade in bold characters is scratched in a late medieval hand "mors cõparat / umbre que / semper / sequitur / corpus". On the North splay of the West window of the tower in a bold 16th-century hand can be found "Th[om]as [?Jek]yll Clar[ke] of Ga[m]ly[n]gaye".
