= Gallowfauld =

Coordinates: 56.56841°N 2.91705°W

- Location within Angus
- Council area: Angus
- Lieutenancy area: Angus
- Country: Scotland
- Sovereign state: United Kingdom
- Police: Scotland
- Fire: Scottish
- Ambulance: Scottish
- UK Parliament: Angus
- Scottish Parliament: Angus

Gallowfauld is a hamlet in the county of Angus, Scotland. It lies 3.8 miles (6.1 km) south of Inverarity, Angus, Scotland.
