= Toppesfield =

Village in Essex, England

Coordinates: 52.007°N 0.532°E

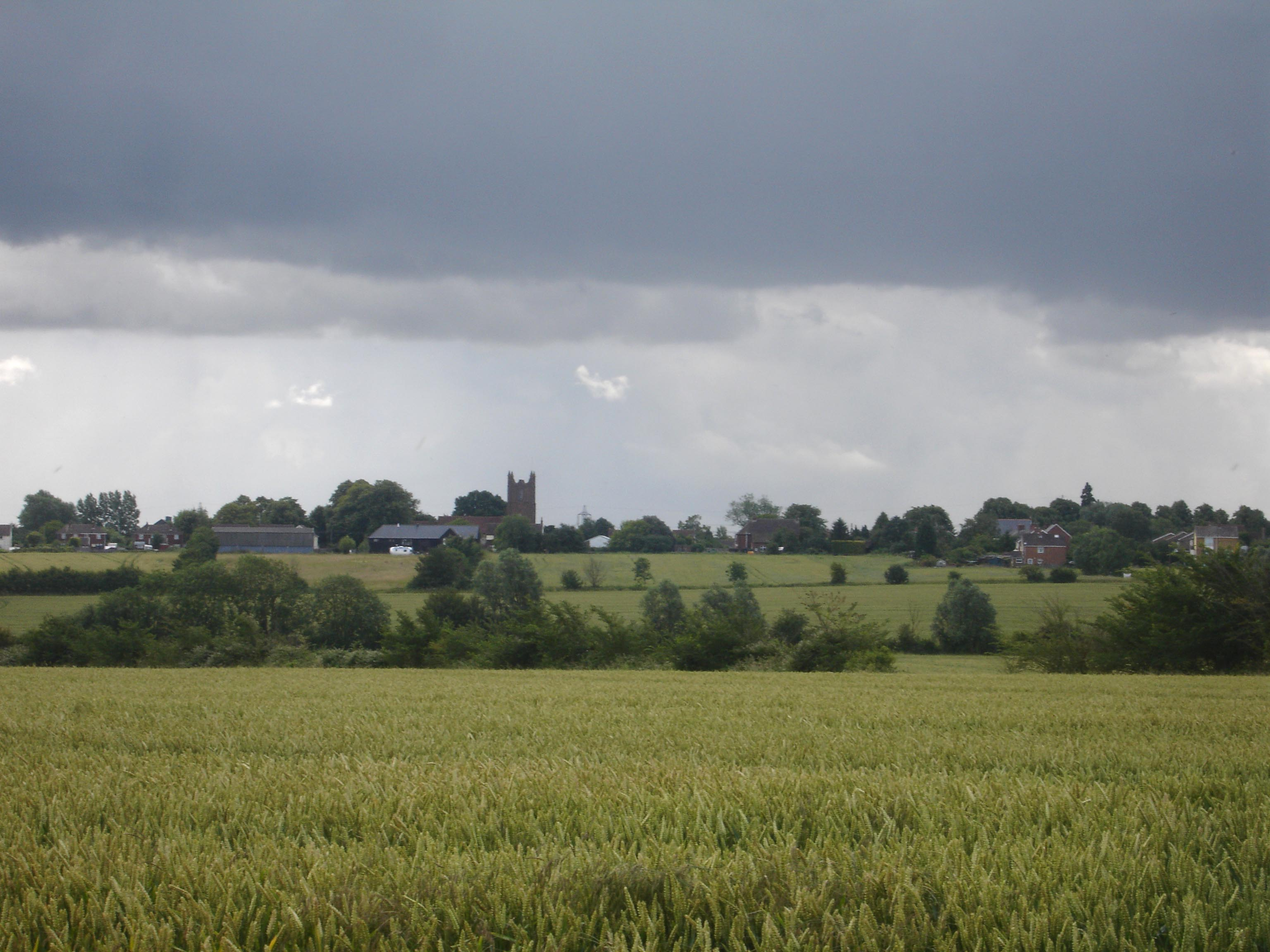
- Toppesfield from Stambourne Road

- Location within Essex
- Population: 493 (Parish, 2021)
- OS grid reference: TL739372
- District: Braintree
- Shire county: Essex
- Region: East
- Country: England
- Sovereign state: United Kingdom
- Post town: Halstead
- Postcode district: CO9
- Dialling code: 01787
- Police: Essex
- Fire: Essex
- Ambulance: East of England
- UK Parliament: Saffron Walden

Toppesfield is a village and civil parish in the Braintree district of Essex, England. The village is approximately 19 miles (31 km) north from the county town of Chelmsford and 1.5 miles (2.4 km) west from the village of Great Yeldham. As well as the village itself, the parish also contains the hamlets of Gainsford End and Grass Green. According to the 2021 census, the parish had a population of 493.

== History ==
'Toppesfield' is derived from the phrase 'open land on the hill top', a possible agglomeration of the phrase 'Top of the Field'.

== Geography ==
Toppesfield, 8 miles (13 km) from the Suffolk border, is part of North Essex which has higher terrain than most of Essex. The village sits on a small and shallow hill about 75 metres above sea level.

== Community ==
Toppesfield is a rural community historically associated with arable farming. The village has approximately 500 inhabitants. The hamlet of Gainsford End, of which there are approximately fifty inhabitants, is about 1.5 miles (2.4 km) southwest from the village and contains the listed Gainsford End Mill.

In 2002, following the closure of the last privately owned shop in the parish, a community-owned and volunteer-run shop was built. This is attached to the village hall, which had been built and opened in 1961 following several years of fundraising by parishioners and financial support from Lord Sainsbury and Sir Leslie and Lady Plummer, all of whom lived in the village. Toppesfield's only public house is the Green Man. The pub is owned by Toppesfield Community Pub Limited (TCP), a Community Benefit Society which was established in 2012. TCP gained control of the Green Man in December 2012 from Admiral Taverns, a national pub chain which had financial problems. TCP is owned by more than 150 shareholders who raised share capital exceeding £150,000 to help finance the purchase.

St Margaret’s Church, Toppesfield, a Church of England parish church, is part of the Upper Colne Valley Parishes joint benefice. The church has a ring of 8 bells. Affiliated with the church is St Margaret's Church of England primary school.

The village has a primary school, St Margaret's CofE Voluntary Controlled School, which dates back to 1854.
