= Gallows Inn =

Coordinates: 52.960°N 1.291°W

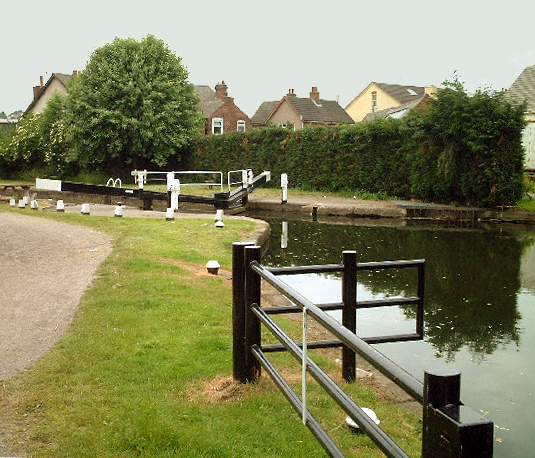
- Gallows Inn Canal Lock, Ilkeston.

- Location within Derbyshire
- OS grid reference: SK477403
- District: Erewash
- Shire county: Derbyshire
- Region: East Midlands
- Country: England
- Sovereign state: United Kingdom
- Post town: ILKESTON
- Postcode district: DE7
- Dialling code: 0115
- Police: Derbyshire
- Fire: Derbyshire
- Ambulance: East Midlands
- UK Parliament: Erewash

Gallows Inn is an area of Ilkeston in Derbyshire, in the East Midlands of England.

On the southern outskirts of Ilkeston, the area is named after the Gallows Inn (sometimes known as the 'Horse and Jockey' but now back to its traditional title) on Nottingham Road, itself named for the spot where a gallows reputedly stood in the 17th century.

The place is bordered by the Erewash Canal, and a lock carries the same name. The border with Nottinghamshire follows the area's eastern boundary.
