= Gamlingay Cinques =

Nature reserve in the United Kingdom

Coordinates: 52.161°N 0.209°W

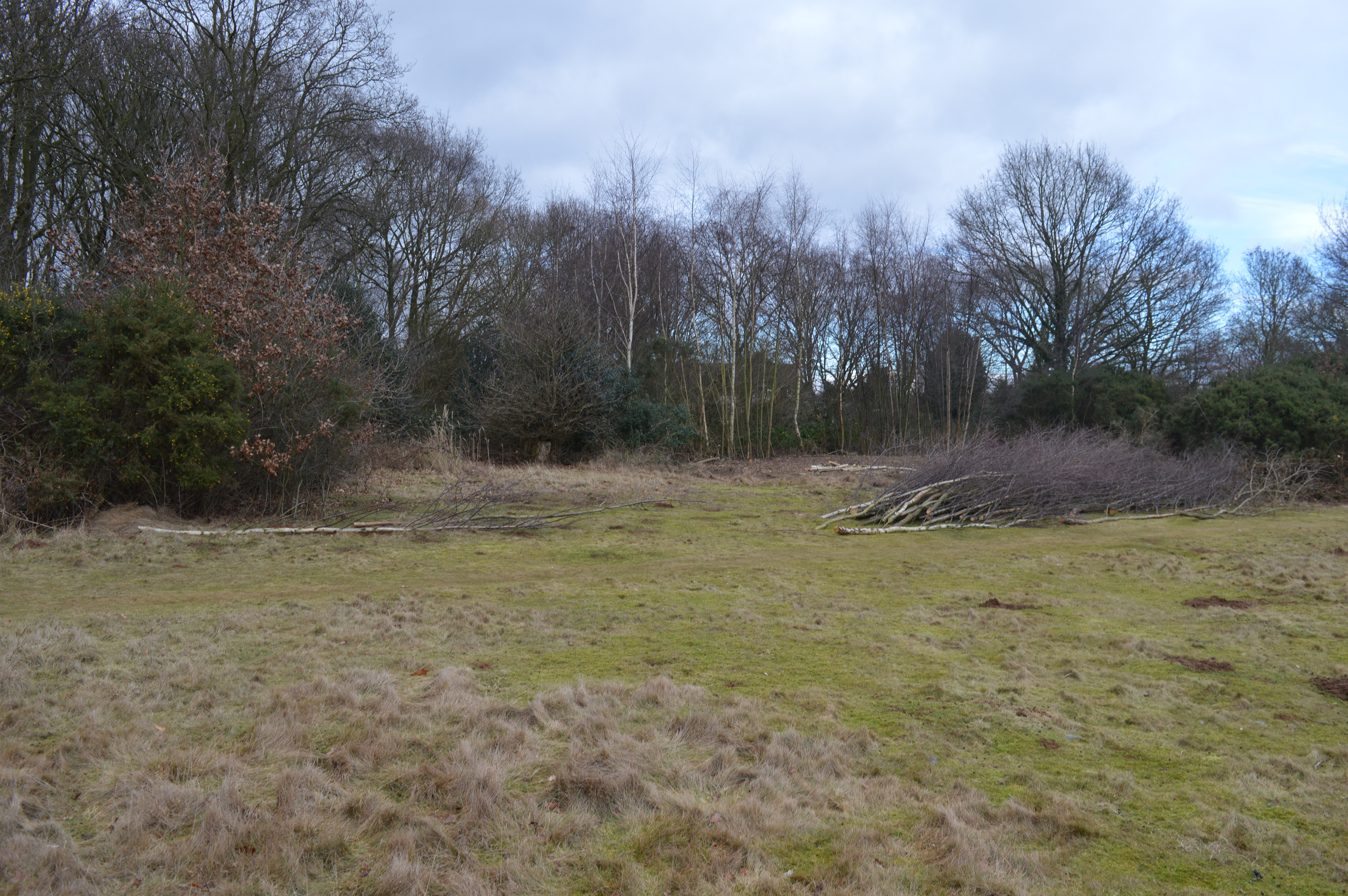
- Interactive map of Gamlingay Cinques
- Type: Nature reserve
- Location: Gamlingay, Cambridgeshire
- OS grid: TL 226 529
- Area: 3.4 hectares (8.4 acres)
- Manager: Wildlife Trust for Bedfordshire, Cambridgeshire and Northamptonshire

Gamlingay Cinques is a 3.4-hectare (8.4-acre) nature reserve in Gamlingay in Cambridgeshire. It is managed by the Wildlife Trust for Bedfordshire, Cambridgeshire and Northamptonshire.

This site is on dry sandy soil, which is an unusual habitat in the county. Grazing by sheep helps to restore the acid grassland and prevent encroachment by woodland and scrub. flora include slender St John's wort, harebell and devil's bit scabious.

There is access from Drove Road and The Cinques.

The area where the nature reserve is located is sometimes called Gamlingay Cinques.
