= Kincaldrum =

Coordinates: 56°35′31″N 02°55′36″W

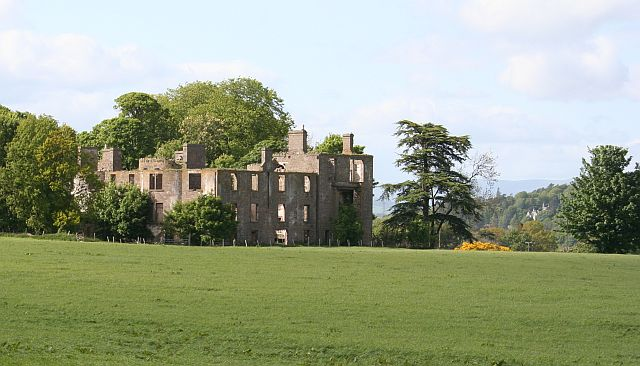
- Kincaldrum House ruins

- Location within Angus
- Council area: Angus
- Lieutenancy area: Angus
- Country: Scotland
- Sovereign state: United Kingdom
- Post town: FORFAR
- Police: Scotland
- Fire: Scottish
- Ambulance: Scottish
- UK Parliament: Angus
- Scottish Parliament: Angus

Kincaldrum is a hamlet in the county of Angus, Scotland. It lies 1 km northwest of Gateside. Kincaldrum House lies in ruins. A corn mill once stood near the hamlet.
