= Gainsford End =

Hamlet in Essex, England

Coordinates: 51.991°N 0.514°E

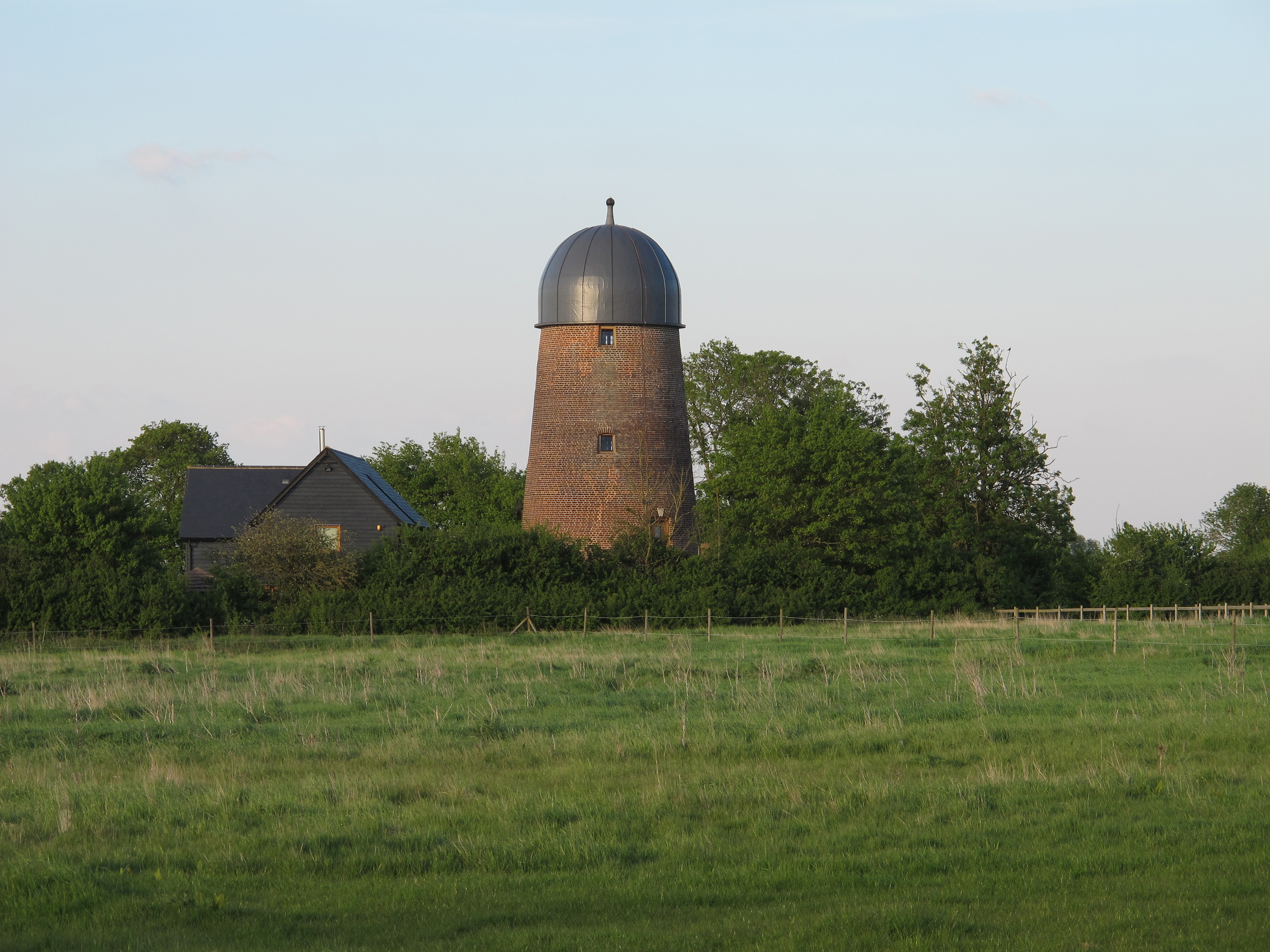
- Gainsford End Windmill

- Location within Essex
- Civil parish: Toppesfield
- District: Braintree
- Shire county: Essex
- Region: East
- Country: England
- Sovereign state: United Kingdom
- Police: Essex
- Fire: Essex
- Ambulance: East of England

Gainsford End is a hamlet in the civil parish of Toppesfield, in the Braintree district of Essex, England. The hamlet is 1.5 miles (2.4 km) southwest from the parish village of Toppesfield.

Gainsford End, with the village of Toppesfield, won first prize in the 2016 Essex Village of the Year competition

To the south of the hamlet is Gainsford End Mill, a Grade II listed former corn windmill dating to 1869. By 1974 the mill was derelict, but was subsequently refurbished as a private home, selling for £1.1 million in 2017.
