= Gateside, Angus =

Coordinates: 56.587°N 2.916°W

Gateside
- Location within Angus
- OS grid reference: NO438442
- Council area: Angus
- Lieutenancy area: Angus
- Country: Scotland
- Sovereign state: United Kingdom
- Post town: FORFAR
- Postcode district: DD8
- Dialling code: 01241
- Police: Scotland
- Fire: Scottish
- Ambulance: Scottish
- UK Parliament: Angus
- Scottish Parliament: Angus

Gateside is a hamlet in the county of Angus, Scotland. It lies 7 miles south of Forfar on the A90 road.

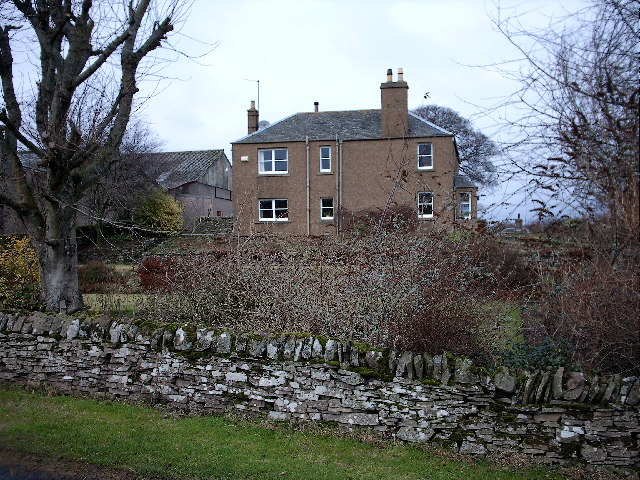
Kincriech Farmhouse, Gatesisde
