= List of British Association of Barbershop Singers quartet champions =

This is a list of all the National Quartet Champions in the British Association of Barbershop Singers (BABS) since their first contest in 1974.

Winners and any quartets that score 78% or over are eligible to be invited to compete in the Barbershop Harmony Society International Quartet Contest.

Year	Quartet	Chapter(s)	Tenor	Lead	Baritone	Bass
1974	The Ringleaders	Crawley, Brighton	Paul Wren	Bob Walker	Ron Avis	Bill Little
1975	The Five Bridge Four	Wearside	Ron Hope	Bill Gilles	Jack Dutton	Keith Murray
1976	The Barrytones	Reading	Barry Nowell	Nick Carter	Colin Carter	Bob Watkin
1977	The Fortunaires	Crawley	Brian Shorrocks	Bob Walker	Colin Barnaby	George Parish
1978	The Newtown Ringers	Crawley	Bill Hilton	Don Amos	Mike Watts	Bob Witherington
1979	No competition	–	–	–	–	–
1980	Par Four	Gr. Manchester	Phil Bricknell	John Batty	Steve Hall	Tom Percy
1981	Regency Pride	Brighton, Hove, Crawley)	Allan Henderson	Keith Pover	Derek Barton	Graham Smith
1982	Limited Company	Leeds, Gr. Manchester	Clive Landey	Howard Myers	Steve Hall	Stuart Wineberg
1983	Mancunian Way	Gr. Manchester	Graham Frost	Bob Thomson	John Batty	John Kelly
1984	On Spec	Preston, Gr. Manchester	Steve Hall	Keith Northrop	Richard Baker	Tom Percy
1985	Gilt Edge	Plymouth	Jack Bird	Graham Willcocks	Roger Williams	Ian Wiseman
1986	Junction 33	Sheffield	Phil Bricknell	Clive Hill	Colin Maskrey	Steve Holden
1987	Times Square	Sheffield	Vaughan Dooley	Tony Barnes	Richard Curtis	Geoff Packwood
1988	High Time	Bradford, Mold	Steve Hall	Keith Northrop	Laurie Whittle	Roy Dawson
1989	Quartz Precision	Crawley, Bromley	Derek Barton	Brian Schofield	Andy Clarke	Graham Smith
1990	Curtain Call	W. Midlands	Rod Butcher	Bernie Cureton	Dale Kynaston	John Riseborough
1991	Talk of the Town	Bolton	David Tanner	Keith Northrop	John Ward	Roy Dawson
1992	Quattro	Leeds	Dave Arran	Dave Brown	Tim Braham	Martin Ford
1993	Island Engagement	IOW, Portsmouth	Alan Hartley	Alan Sloper	Jon Conway	Stuart Sides
1994	Sound Assembly	W. Midlands, Bradford, Mon	Rod Butcher	Bernie Cureton	Martin Flory	Martin Ford
1995	Smilin' Thru'	Sheffield	Russ Beeden	Dave Brown	Paul Grier	Steve Holden
1996	Hooked on Harmony	Worthing, Crawley	Derek Barton	Brian Schofield	Andy Curd	Gerry Burgrum
1997	Cambridge Blues	Cambridge	Ian James	Bob Croft	John Palmer	David Farmer
1998	Chordial Exchange	Manchester, Bolton	Chris Barnes	Dave Roberts	Tom Riley	Tom Percy
1999	Shockwave	Potton, Selby	Tony Bylett	Dave Brown	Paul Grier	Graham Davies
2000	The Likely Lads	Leeds, Bradford	Duncan Whinyates	Lee Sperry	Tim Braham	Rob Barber
2001	MATRIX	Cambridge, Bolton, Mold	Tony Bylett	Michael Potts	Neil Firth	Martin Ford
2002	The Light Industrial Choral Society	Cambridge, Peterborough	Geoff Unwin	Brian Schofield	Andy Clarke	Graham Davies
2003	Sound Crew	Telford	Andy Foster	Dale Kynaston	Tom Wilkin	Andy Funnell
2004	Prime Time	Cambridge, Portsmouth	Steve Green	Stuart Sides	Jon Conway	Stuart Owen
2005	The Works	Cambridge, Reading	Mike Warner	Brian Schofield	John Palmer	Martin Ford
2006	Pitch Invasion	East Midlands, Telford	Rod Butcher	Dale Kynaston	Timm Barkworth	Andy Funnell
2007	Q.E.D.	Cornwall & S. Devon, Monmouth & Bristol	Dick Knight	Keith Rees	Peter Nugent	Andrew Walker
2008	Monkey Magic	Bolton	Alan Hughes	Zac Booles	Joe Knight	Duncan Blackeby
2009	Evolution	Cambridge	Tony Bylett	Michael Potts	Timm Barkworth	Stuart Owen
2010	Steel	Bristol	Andy Foster	Keith Rees	Peter Nugent	Andy Funnell
2011	Crossfire		Ian James	Duncan Whinyates	Neil Firth	Andy Walker
2012	iQ		Mike Warner	Brian Schofield	Peter Nugent	Mike Taylor
2013	The Emerald Guard	Sheffield	Antoine Kaiserman	Tim Briggs	Andy Allen	Duncan Blackeby
2014	Park Street	Bristol	Laurence Hasson	Alastair Hay-Plumb	David Foot	Simon Arnott
2015	Tagline	Sheffield	Ben Ferguson	James Gower-Smith	Chris Langworthy	Rob Foot
2016	Finest Hour	East Midlands, Preston	James Williams	Eddie Williams	Nick Williams	Phil Cuthbert
2017	Portobello Road	South East, Midlands	Ian James	Brian Schofield	Steve Emery	Stuart Owen
2018	The Locksmiths		Richard Fisher	Simon Lubkowski	Zac Booles	Andy Walker
2019	Sound Hypothesis	Don Amos (London)	Arran Bayliss-Chalmers	Conrad Godfrey	Arun O'Sullivan	Alex Moore
2020	No competition	–	–	–	–	–
2021	No competition	–	–	–	–	–
2022	Limelight	Don Amos, Vale of York	Peter Bryant	Danny Gortler	Luke Freeney	Connor Cobb
2023	Trailblazers	Central London	Alex Sanctuary	Alastair Hay-Plumb	James Whittick	Simon Arnott
2024	Fifth Element	Don Amos, MaleVox	Brian Fox	Duncan Whinyate	Ryan Jensen	Jake Waghorn
2025	The 1234	Don Amos, MaleVox	Joe Knight	Mark Soave	Alan Hughes	Jonny Pipe
2026	Overtime	Don Amos	Andy Foster	Eddie Williams	Nick Williams	Jonny Pipe

== See also ==
- British Association of Barbershop Singers
