= Wrestlingworth and Cockayne Hatley =

- Civil parish
- Interactive map of Wrestlingworth and Cockayne Hatley
- Coordinates: 52.121°N 0.161°W
- Country: England
- Primary council: Central Bedfordshire
- County: Bedfordshire
- Region: East of England
- Status: Parish
- Main settlements: Wrestlingworth; Cockayne Hatley

Government
  - Type: Parish Council
  - UK Parliament: North Bedfordshire

Population (2011)
  - Total: 744
- Postal code: SG19
- Area code: SG

Wrestlingworth and Cockayne Hatley is a civil parish in Bedfordshire, England. It was formed when the civil parishes of Wrestlingworth and Cockayne Hatley were amalgamated in 1985.

== Parish council ==
As of May 2025, the parish council has seven seats. No elections have been held since 2009 because there have been an insufficient number of candidates to fill the seats.

== Geography ==
The parish is bordered by the Central Bedfordshire parishes of Eyeworth, Potton and Sutton, and the South Cambridgeshire parishes of Gamlingay, Guilden Morden, Hatley and Tadlow.

== Lousy Bush ==
Lousy Bush Local Nature Reserve, a former gravel pit, is owned by the parish council and managed by Wrestlingworth and Cockayne Hatley Parish Walking and Wildlife Group. It lies one mile west of Water End and is accessible via a public bridleway. Ownership of the then named Wrestlingworth Gravel Pits was challenged in 1972; no owner was named under the Commons Registration Act 1965. The hearing noted the land was a public stone gravel and mortar pit by an Award in 1804. The adjudicator decided Wrestlingworth Parish Council was the owner of the land. The site was previously known as Wrestlingworth Gravel Pits Nature Reserve and is set within an agricultural landscape. Recorded wildlife includes a barn owl, muntjac, a badger sett, a fox, rabbits and many species of moth, some such as the Ruddy Carpet, Marbled Coronet and Dingy Shears being 'relatively uncommon' in Bedfordshire.
