= List of quartet champions =

List of quartet champions may refer to:

- List of Barbershop Harmony Society quartet champions
- List of BABS quartet champions
- Barbershop in Germany#Champions
- Harmony, Incorporated#Quartet champions
- Sweet Adelines International competition#Champions
