= Crawley Chordsmen =

Male a cappella group from Crawley, England

The Crawley Chordsmen was a male a cappella group from Crawley, England, reported to be the first modern barbershop choir in the UK when formed in 1964. They subsequently affiliated with the British Association of Barbershop Singers (BABS), formed in 1974, and won the BABS gold medal in the category for national chorus four times^{,} in 1975, 1976, 1978 and 1984. They are one of only two choruses (along with The Great Western Chorus of Bristol) to have won the gold medal back to back, due to the "Year Out" rule, wherein a chorus that wins the national contest is now mandated to take a year out.

They released the album Double Gold in 1977, working with two other barbershop choirs The Fortunairs and The Newton Ringers who both also appear on the BABS roll of honour.
