= Finest Hour (quartet) =

2016 British Association of Barbershop Singers Quartet Champions

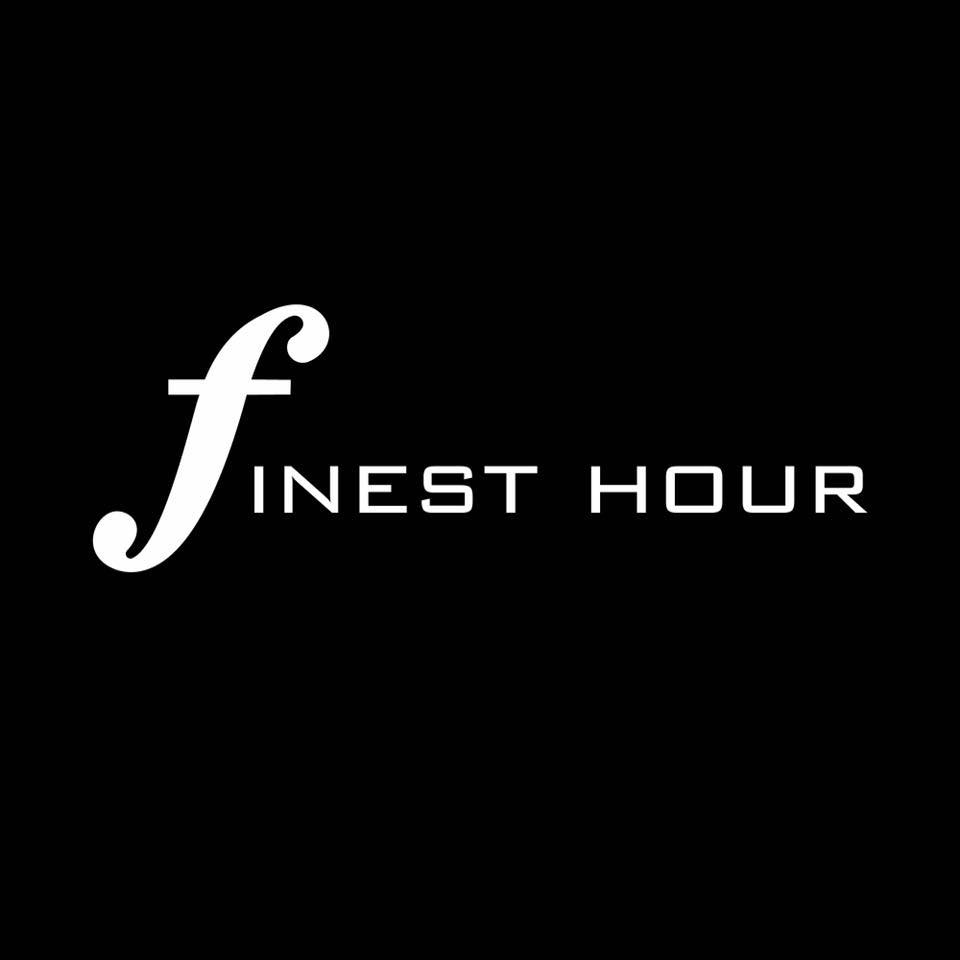

Background information
- Genre: Barbershop
- Years active: 2014–2019
- Members: James Williams – tenor Eddie Williams – lead Nick Williams – baritone Jonny Pipe – bass
- Past members: Phil Cuthbert – bass
- Website: facebook.com/FinestHourQuartet/

Finest Hour is a British barbershop quartet. It won the 2016 British barbershop quartet championship in 2016, and the 2017 European barbershop quartet championship. The quartet competed in the international Barbershop Harmony Society competitions in 2017 and 2019, where they placed 28th and 22nd respectively. They also hold the UK record for the highest qualifying score of 83%.

== History ==
The three Williams brothers – James (tenor), Eddie (lead), and Nick (baritone) – have sung together from a young age, and had sung with their father, Nigel Williams (bass), as a quartet named "Homespun". Homespun competed at the BABS Conventions for many years, placing third in 2013. They were a crowd favourite but over time Nigel decided to step down. In 2014, Phil Cuthbert, a long-time family friend, stepped in to help form their new quartet, "Finest Hour". After placing third in their first national competition in 2015, they went on to win the gold medal in Harrogate in May 2016 with a record-high score of 82.9 per cent.

In October 2016, Finest Hour was the guest quartet at the Irish Association of Barbershop Singers (IABS) Convention held in Cork. In April 2017, Finest Hour performed in a concert at Loughborough College.

At the May 2017 BABS national convention in Bournemouth, Finest Hour scored 81.8 per cent, the highest by a quartet that weekend, and qualified to compete at the July 2018 BHS International Convention in Orlando, Florida.

The quartet qualified for the Barbershop Harmony Society (BHS) International Convention in Las Vegas in 2017 and, in their first time representing the British Association of Barbershop Singers (BABS), placed 28th out of 55 quartets across the world who reached that level of competition.

In October 2017, Finest Hour competed at the European Barbershop Convention, representing BABS, where they achieved 1st place with a score of 79.4%. After this contest, Cuthbert decided to step down and Jonny Pipe, a fellow singer with The Grand Central Chorus in Nottingham, transitioned to the quartet's bass voice part. Pipe had previously sung with the 'House Lights Up' quartet in Spain, which placed third at the Spanish Association of Barbershop Singers convention in Benalmádena in 2015. The official bass handover took place at the BABS prelims competition in November 2017. Notably, in May 2018, Finest Hour were asked to be the guest quartet at the Sweet Adelines Quartet of Nations Region 31 convention at the Sage Gateshead. In Pipe's first time competing on the quartet stage in the UK, Finest Hour attended the BABS 2018 convention in Harrogate to compete for a qualifying score for the 2019 international competition. The new rules meant the highest scoring quartet of the weekend gained automatic qualification, which Finest Hour achieved with a UK record score of 83%.

At the BHS international competition at Salt Lake City in July 2019, Finest Hour placed 22nd out of 57 quartets at that level, only one scoring point behind their nearest competitor, and just thirteen points away from becoming the second British quartet in history (after Reckless in 2017) to make the International semi-finals.

In May 2023, the quartet announced that individual priorities had remained different after the COVID-19 pandemic and James had decided to leave the quartet; the remaining trio were then undecided on whether to move forward. In May 2025, singing bass with The 1234, Pipe won a gold medal in the annual BABS national quartet competition.

In July 2025, the quartet announced that they had found a new tenor, Andy Foster, and would then be forming a new quartet, called Overtime, with the intention of competing nationally and internationally under the new name going forwards. Overtime won the BABS national contest in May 2026.

== Contest placement ==
=== BABS National ===
2015	2016	2026	(as Overtime)
3rd	1st	1st	

=== BHS International ===
2017	2019
28th	22nd

=== European Convention ===
2017
1st

== Recordings ==
- This Is Us – (2016)
- Accentuate the Positive – (2022)

== Notes ==
Preceded by Tagline	BABS National Quartet Champions; 2016	Succeeded by Portobello Road
