= Church of St Peter, Wrestlingworth =

Church in Bedfordshire, England

Coordinates: 52.1103°N 0.1626°W

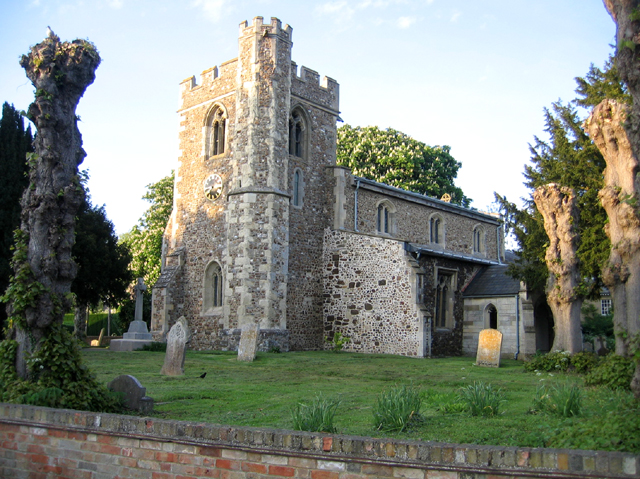

Church of St Peter is a Grade I listed church in Wrestlingworth, Bedfordshire, England. It became a listed building on 31 October 1966.

== See also ==
- Grade I listed buildings in Bedfordshire

== History and architecture ==
Built in the 12th century, it was restored in Victorian times. The church, which is dedicated to St. Peter, consists of a tower, nave, two aisles, chancel, and a south porch. The font is located on the north side of the nave, and is adorned with quatrefoils. A reading desk and pulpit are located in the northeast section. The communion table and some tombstones are 17th-century, while the pulpit and stairs are 18th-century, and some glass is of medieval era.

A programme of restoration was launched in 1985, which was completed in 2022.
