= Buff Wood =

Protected area in Cambridgeshire, England

Coordinates: 52.136°N 0.128°W

- Site of Special Scientific Interest
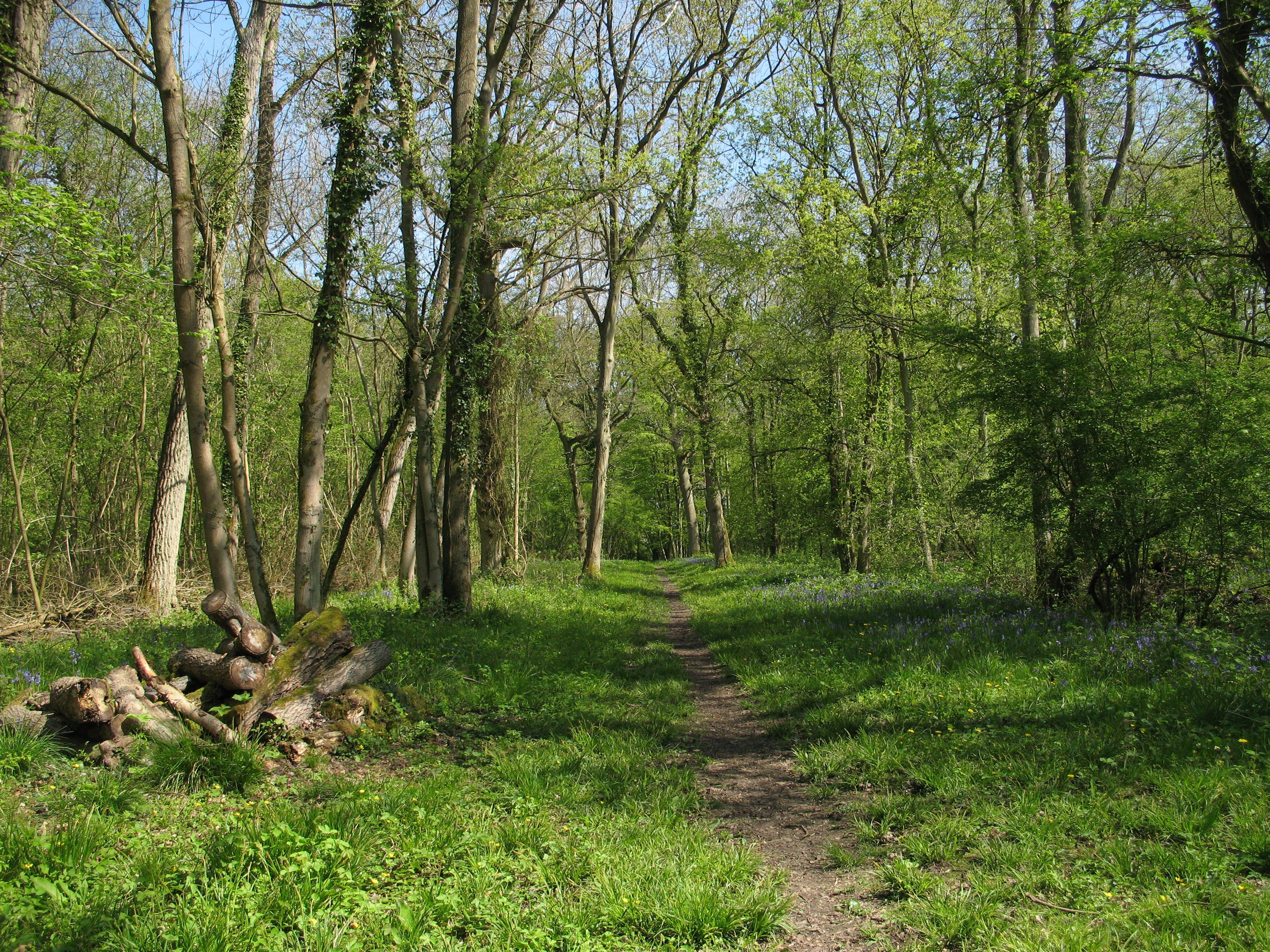
- Location of Buff Wood.
- Area of search: Cambridgeshire
- Grid reference: TL 282 503
- Interest: Biological
- Area: 15.8 hectares
- Notification date: 1984
- Location map: Magic Map

Buff Wood is a 15.8-hectare (39-acre) biological Site of Special Scientific Interest in Hatley in Cambridgeshire. It is owned by the Hatley Park Estate and was formerly managed by the Wildlife Trust for Bedfordshire, Cambridgeshire and Northamptonshire.

This site is ecologically diverse boulder clay woodland, with a range of wildflowers, including oxlips and the uncommon green hellebore. There are butterflies such as brimstones, large whites, orange-tips and speckled woods.
