= Potton Wood =

Woodland in Bedfordshire, England

Coordinates: 52.135°N 0.172°W

- Site of Special Scientific Interest
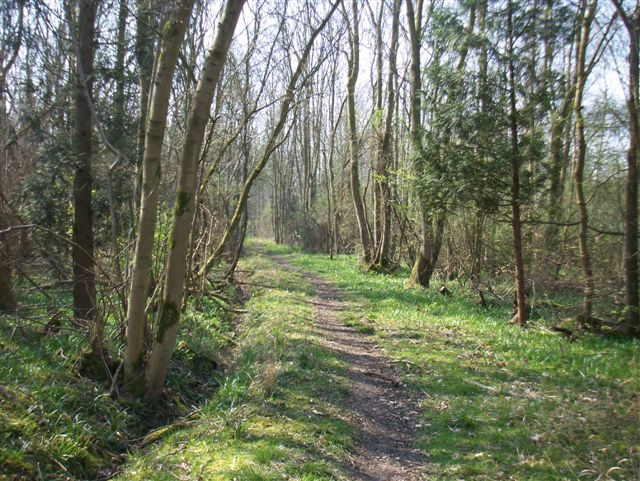
- A footpath through Potton Wood, showing young coppiced trees with bare branches
- Location of Potton Wood.
- Area of search: Bedfordshire
- Grid reference: TL252502
- Interest: Biological
- Area: 85.5 ha (211 acres)
- Notification date: 1984
- Location map: Magic Map

Potton Wood covers an area of 85ha (211 acres) and is two miles east of the small town of Potton in the county of Bedfordshire, England. It is part of Ampthill Forest and is managed by Forest Enterprise and owned by the Forestry Commission.

Potton Wood has been designated a Site of Special Scientific Interest for its significance as an oak/ash/field maple ancient woodland; its structure and flora are typical of the West Cambridgeshire Boulder Clay woodland group.

Unusual plants in the wood include oxlip (a national rarity at the edge of its European range here), herb paris, bird's nest orchid and nettle-leaved bellflower. There are plants typical of ancient woodland: common bluebell, dog's mercury, yellow archangel, wood millet and wood anemone. Potton Wood has large areas of broadleaved woodland, some dating back to at least 1601, but also had commercially planted, non-native conifers which were removed in 2004 as part of a long-term project to restore the coppiced ancient woodland.

Mammals found in the wood include fallow deer, grey squirrel, red fox, European hare and European mole; there are birds such as common nightingale, common chiffchaff, blackcap, common whitethroat and European turtle dove, and white admiral and purple hairstreak butterflies.

On 18 September 1945, a B-24 Liberator bomber based at No. 466 Squadron RAAF at Bassingbourn, Cambridgeshire, crashed on the southern edge of Potton Wood. Four men were killed. The place where it fell can still be seen.

There is access by footpaths from Hatley Road.

== See also ==
- List of Sites of Special Scientific Interest in Hertfordshire
- List of ancient woods in England
