= Wrestlingworth =

Village in Bedfordshire, England

Coordinates: 52.113°N 0.162°W

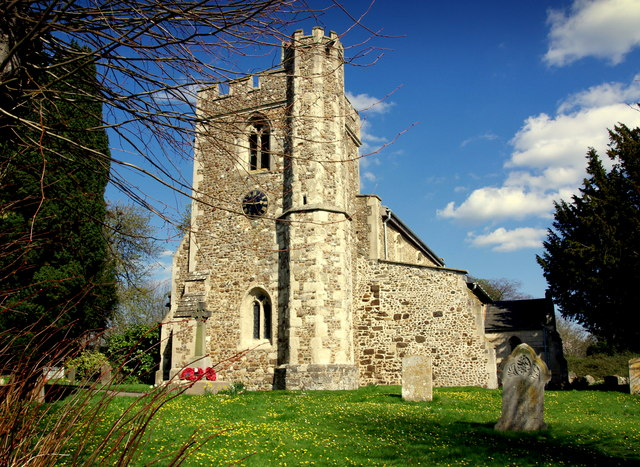
- St Peter's church

- Location within Bedfordshire
- Population: 629 (Built up area, 2021)
- OS grid reference: TL259476
- Civil parish: Wrestlingworth and Cockayne Hatley
- Unitary authority: Central Bedfordshire
- Ceremonial county: Bedfordshire
- Region: East
- Country: England
- Sovereign state: United Kingdom
- Post town: SANDY
- Postcode district: SG19 2
- Dialling code: 01767
- Police: Bedfordshire
- Fire: Bedfordshire
- Ambulance: East of England
- UK Parliament: North Bedfordshire

Wrestlingworth is a village in the civil parish of Wrestlingworth and Cockayne Hatley, in the Central Bedfordshire district of Bedfordshire, England. It lies about 13 miles (21 km) east of the county town of Bedford. The hamlet of Water End is to the south of the village. At the 2021 census the population of the built up area was 629.

Amenities in the village include the village hall and a Church of England VC Lower School. Wrestlingworth has a number of listed buildings including the Church of St Peter. Part of the village is a designated conservation area.

Community groups in the village often meet at the Grade I listed 17th-century public house, The Chequers, and at the Wrestlingworth Memorial Hall. These include the local Women's Institute, the Goodwill Fund, the Walking and Wildlife Group, the History Society and the Badminton Club.

== Geography ==
Wrestlingworth lies 2.5 miles (4 km) east south-east of Potton and 13.5 miles (22 km) south-west of Cambridge. The eastern parish boundary borders Cambridgeshire.

Elevation

The village centre is 41 metres (135 ft) above sea level. The land falls to 28 metres (92 ft) in the south-east corner of the parish. The highest point is in Cockayne Hatley Wood at 91 metres (299 ft).

Landscape

Natural England has designated the area as part of The Bedfordshire and Cambridgeshire Claylands (NCA 88). Central Bedfordshire Council has classified the landscape as Dunton Clay Vale. Not technically a 'vale', it is used here to mean a transitional landscape between a valley and a plateau. Medium to large fields of cereal crops dominate. The limited woodland cover and incomplete or unhedged roads reveal an open, undulating landscape. Former hedgerow lines are marked in places by trees.

Geology, soil type and land use

The majority of the parish is arable farmland but there are also a number of paddocks for horses, cattle and sheep grazing. Most of the parish lies on boulder clay but there is a small strip of gault running through Wrestlingworth village centre. The whole parish has highly fertile lime-rich loamy and clayey soils with slightly impeded drainage.

Lousy Bush, a small 0.6 hectares (1 acre) nature reserve is at a former gravel pit to the south-west of the village. It is registered as common land and owned by the Parish Council.

The night sky and light pollution

Light pollution is the level of radiance (night lights) shining up into the night sky. The Campaign to Protect Rural England (CPRE) divides the level of night sky brightness into 9 bands with band 1 being the darkest i.e. with the lowest level of light pollution and band 9 the brightest and most polluted. Wrestlingworth is in bands 3 and 4 with darker sky surrounding, particularly looking north-east.

Public footpaths and bridleways

A public footpath from Water End links with bridleways to Biggleswade via Lousy Bush, The Lodge, Dunton Fen, Sunderland Hall Farm and West Sunderland Farm.

== History ==
Wrestlingworth is not mentioned in the Domesday Book. However, by the mid-12th century two manor houses – Kendale's and Hereford's – are recorded as the village which was being established along the banks of a tributary of the River Cam. Historic names were Wrastlingewurde in the 12th century and Wrestlingforth in the 17th and 18th centuries.

The Church of St. Peter was established in about 1300. Graves from the Great Plague are still clearly visible in St. Peter's churchyard, together with low set ‘leper’ windows.

Population growth in Wrestlingworth since 1801
Year	Pop.	±%
1801	330	—
1841	487	+47.6%
1881	638	+31.0%
1901	456	−28.5%
1921	433	−5.0%
1951	391	−9.7%
1961	393	+0.5%
1981	601	+52.9%
2001#	736	+22.5%
2011#	744	+1.1%
# including Cockayne Hatley

There used to be a post office/shop and a local convenience store and there is still a public house, The Chequers.

=== The last woman to be publicly hanged in England ===
In the 1840s, notoriety hit the village when the case of the murderer Sarah Dazley came to the fore. By the age of 25, Dazley had poisoned two husbands and a child. She was about to marry a third husband when villagers warned him of her past and subsequent investigations took place. These commenced with exhumation of the bodies and a Coroner's Inquest which was held in The Chequers Pub. Traces of arsenic were found and several local residents gave evidence against Dazley during her trial at Bedford Assizes.

At the end of the case, Dazley was found guilty and sentenced to be hanged outside Bedford Gaol. She was the last woman to be publicly hanged in England and it is said that the entire Wrestlingworth community walked or rode over to Bedford to see the event.

== Governance ==
There are two tiers of local government covering Wrestlingworth, at parish and unitary authority level: Wrestlingworth and Cockayne Hatley Parish Council and Central Bedfordshire Council. The parish council meets at the Memorial Hall in Wrestlingworth.

Wrestlingworth was an ancient parish in the Biggleswade hundred of Bedfordshire. Wrestlingworth parish was merged with the neighbouring parish of Cockayne Hatley in 1985 to form the new civil parish of Wrestlingworth and Cockayne Hatley.

== Public services ==
Wrestlingworth is in the Potton Public Water Supply Zone (RW50). The water supplied by Anglian Water comes from groundwater boreholes and is chloraminated and classed as hard.

The Eastern Power Area of UK Power Networks is the distribution network operator for electricity. There is no mains gas supply and most properties use heating oil.

The nearest general hospitals are Bedford (Bedford Hospital NHS Trust), Lister Hospital, Stevenage (East and North Hertfordshire Teaching NHS Trust) and Addenbrooke's Hospital, Cambridge (Cambridge University Hospitals NHS Foundation Trust). Ambulance services are provided by the East of England Ambulance Service NHS Trust. Bedfordshire Fire and Rescue Service and Bedfordshire Police cover the village.

The closest public library is at Potton.

== Public transport ==
As of June 2026, Grant Palmer provides a limited daytime service to Biggleswade, and via Potton and Sandy to Bedford on route no. 72, and also service no. 189, which on weekdays serves Stratton Upper School. A2B Bus and Coach provide a limited daytime service on its 75 and X75 Biggleswade - Cambridge route. Ivel Sprinter runs weekly services to Biggleswade and Cambridge.

The nearest railway stations are Biggleswade and Sandy.

== Listed buildings ==
Grade II listed buildings:

- 7 Water End is a 17th-century, thatched roof, timber-framed cottage with colour-washed rendered walls. A further two thatched cottages stand in Church Lane; no.12 is 17th-century and no. 3 is dated, 1829.
- Listed in 1966, Home Farm dates from the 16th-century or earlier and could be the former manor house. It is timber-framed with colour-washed render under a slate roof. A former 17th-century dovecote at the farm has around 169 nesting boxes made of wattle and daub attached to each wall.

== Notable people ==
Sydney Beaumont, a former professional football player and manager, runner and cricketer was born in Wrestlingworth.
