= Cockayne Hatley =

Village in Bedfordshire, England

Coordinates: 52.1304°N 0.1607°W

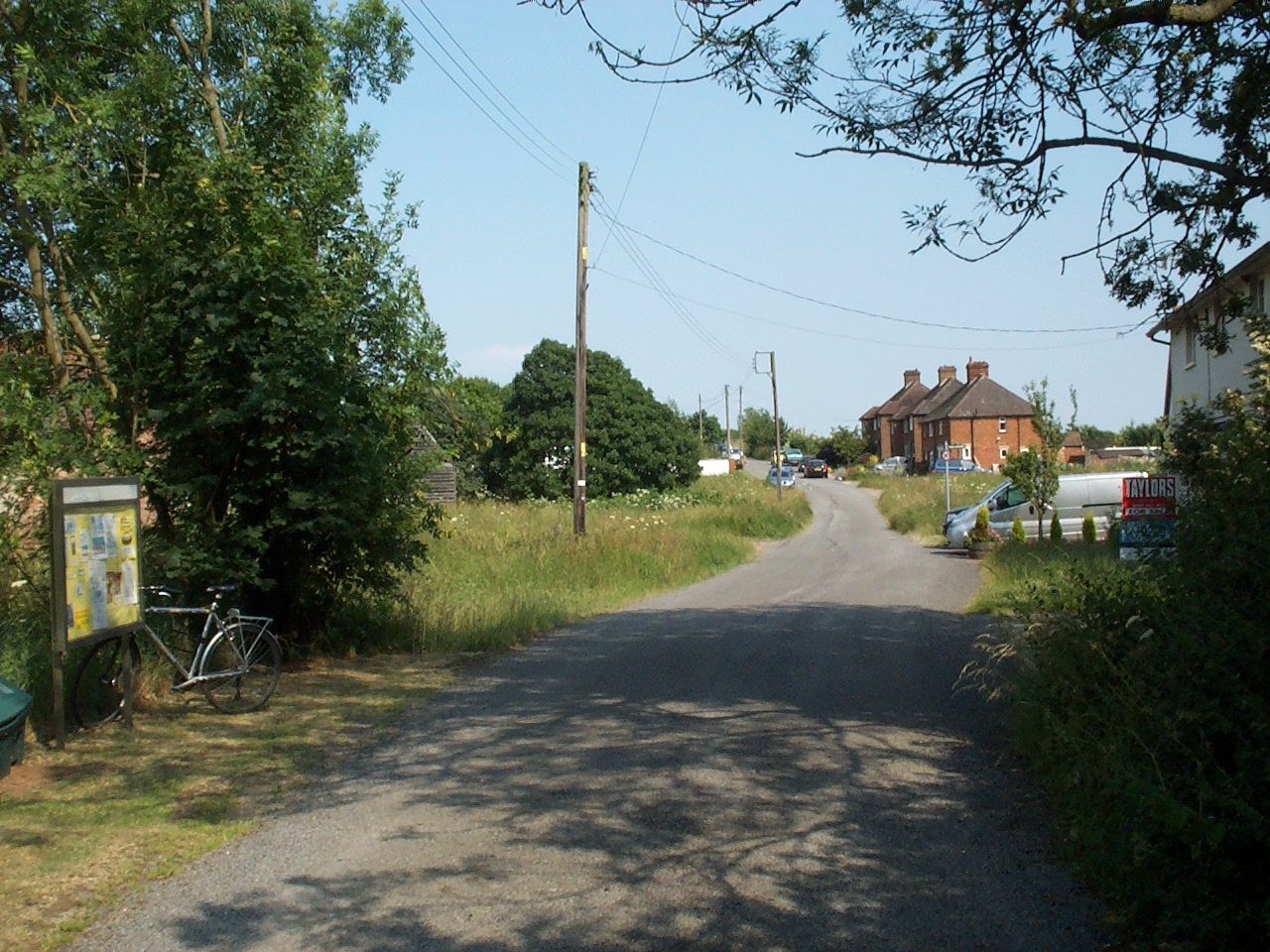
- The far end of the village

- Location within Bedfordshire
- OS grid reference: TL260496
- Civil parish: Wrestlingworth and Cockayne Hatley
- Unitary authority: Central Bedfordshire
- Ceremonial county: Bedfordshire
- Region: East
- Country: England
- Sovereign state: United Kingdom
- Post town: Sandy
- Postcode district: SG19
- Dialling code: 01767
- Police: Bedfordshire
- Fire: Bedfordshire
- Ambulance: East of England
- UK Parliament: North Bedfordshire

Cockayne Hatley is a village in the civil parish of Wrestlingworth and Cockayne Hatley, in the Central Bedfordshire district of Bedfordshire, England. It lies 13 miles (21 km) east of the county town of Bedford.

== Etymology ==
The Cockayne part of the name comes from the surname of the Cokayne family, who took possession of the land in 1417.

== Geography ==
Cockayne Hatley lies just over 1 mile (2 km) north of Wrestlingworth, 3 miles (5 km) east of Potton, 6 miles (10 km) north-east of Biggleswade and 13 miles (21 km) south-west of Cambridge.

=== Landscape ===
Natural England has designated the area as part of The Bedfordshire and Cambridgeshire Claylands (NCA 88). Central Bedfordshire Council has classified the landscape as Cockayne Hatley Clay Farmland (1C). Characteristics are gentle rolling slopes rising to the low plateau of Cockayne Hatley Wood, from which there are panoramic views to the south-east of large geometric fields bounded by hedgerows.

=== Elevation ===
The village centre is 61 metres (200 ft) above sea level. The land rises to 91 metres (299 ft) in Cockayne Hatley Wood.

=== Geology ===
The village lies on boulder clay over gault. The surrounding farmland of 587 hectares belongs to a Danish family and is contract farmed by W.J. Kendall & Sons of Eyeworth, run by Peter Kendall, the former president of the National Farmers' Union, and his brother Richard. The lime-rich loamy and clayey soil is highly fertile but with slightly impeded drainage. The chief crops are wheat, oil seed rape, beans and peas.

== History ==
Population growth in Cockayne Hatley 1801–1961
Year	Pop.	±%
1801	102	—
1841	99	−2.9%
1881	107	+8.1%
1921	87	−18.7%
1961	122	+40.2%
Source: Vision of Britain through Time

=== Cockayne Hatley Hall ===
Cockayne Hatley Hall, once known as Cockayne Hatley Mansion, was originally established by Sir John Cockayne in the 15th century. The Hall has been added to and rebuilt many times. The main parts of the present building are early Victorian with the East wing dating back to the reign of George I. There is still a single wall and fireplace dating back to Tudor times.

The Cockayne family continued to reside at the Hall until the late 1860s. From 1894 to 1897 the Hall was rented by part of the "Old Family Line", the Duke of Rutland. His daughter, Lady Diana Manners, lived there as a young girl before going on to earn the widespread reputation as the most beautiful young woman in England, and appeared in countless profiles, photographs and articles in newspapers and magazines including the front page of Time magazine in February 1926. In 1929 Mr John Whitehead purchased the estate and established the largest apple orchard in England with over one million Cox's Orange Pippin trees. They were dug up and burned as uneconomic in 1974.

A fire destroyed much of the south facing building in 1931. Although repaired, many of the grand rooms and architecture were lost. Mr Whitehead left the Hall shortly after the war selling the whole estate to the Co-op Farming group. Much of the property subsequently fell into disrepair before the Hall, together with some of the surrounding land, was sold back to private ownership. Now greatly restored, the Hall and the adjacent Church of John the Baptist reflect the affluence of its history.

=== Crinkle crankle wall ===
Forming a boundary of the Hall with Home Farm is a grade II listed, late 18th century crinkle crankle wall; the only known example in Bedfordshire. The 2 metres (7 ft) high and 60 metres (197 ft) long angular wall consists of ten zigzags of red brick laid in Flemish bond, with plain brick coping.

== Governance ==
There are two tiers of local government covering Cockayne Hatley, at parish and unitary authority level: Wrestlingworth and Cockayne Hatley Parish Council and Central Bedfordshire Council.

Cockayne Hatley was an ancient parish in the Biggleswade hundred of Bedfordshire.

The parish was merged with the neighbouring parish of Wrestlingworth in 1985 to form a new civil parish called Wrestlingworth and Cockayne Hatley.

== Public transport ==
There is a limited bus service from the Hatley Road turn to Wrestlingworth, Biggleswade, Potton and Sandy. The nearest railway stations are Biggleswade and Sandy.

== St John's Church ==
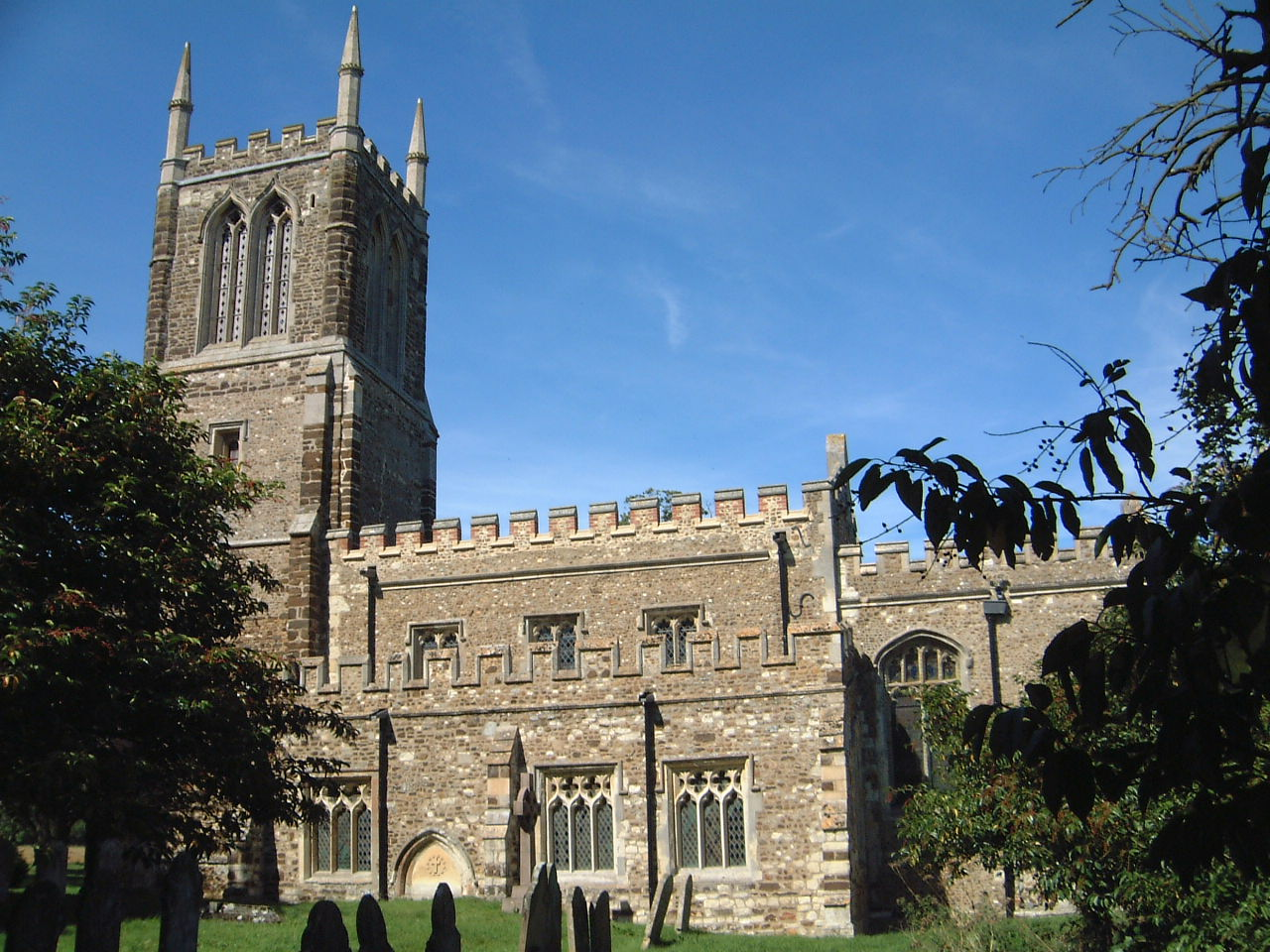
St John's Church c. 2000

The Church of St John the Baptist is situated at the gates of an ancient hall and dates to the thirteenth century. It contains numerous high quality works of carved wood and stained glass, mostly from the abbey of Alne near Charleroi. Dating from 1689, these works were acquired from Flanders following the Napoleonic wars by the Rev. Henry Cockayne Cust, parish rector from 1806 to 1861.

The entry for Cockayne Hatley in the 1839 edition of Pigot's Directory of Bedfordshire states: "the painted windows, the oaken screens and the stalls . . . impart to this incomparable country church the similitude to a cathedral in miniature".

The churchyard contains a handsome monument over the grave of the poet W. E. Henley, who was a frequent visitor to Cockayne Hatley Hall. Henley is now chiefly remembered as the author of the poem "Invictus". Henley, who had a wooden leg, was Robert Louis Stevenson's model for Long John Silver. Henley was also a friend of J. M. Barrie, the author of Peter Pan. Henley used to address Barrie as "friend", which Henley's only daughter, Margaret (1888–1894), who is also buried there along with her parents, mispronounced as "fwend" and changed in a childish way to "fwendy-wendy". The latter part of this familiar name gave the name of "Wendy Darling" which later became the Wendy of Peter Pan.
