= St Mary's Church, Potton =

Coordinates: 52.12837°N 0.20749°W

- The Parish Church of St Mary, Potton
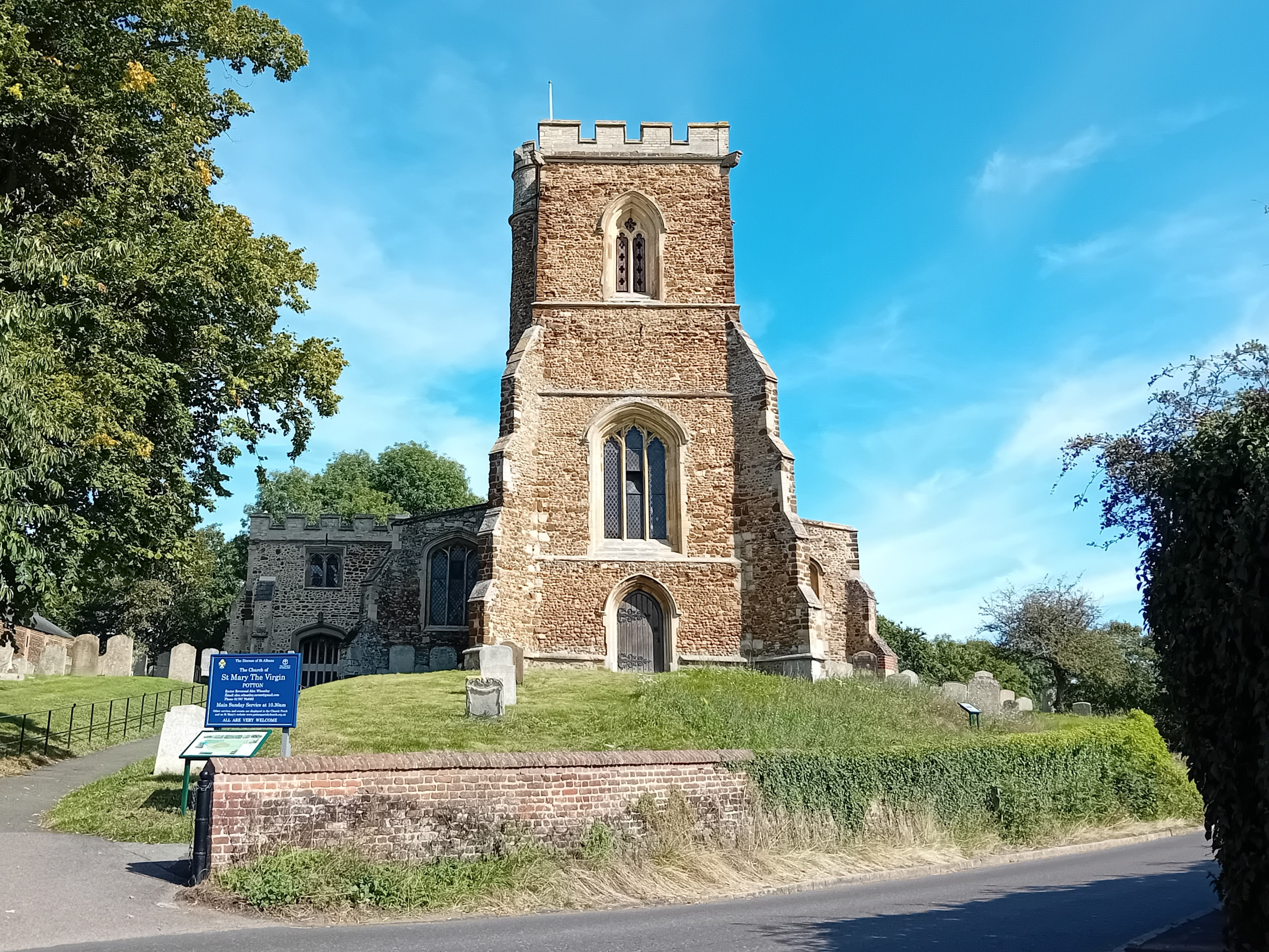
- St Mary's Church, Potton
- Country: England
- Denomination: Church of England
- Website: http://www.pottonparishchurch.org.uk

History
- Status: Parish church
- Dedication: St Mary

Architecture
- Functional status: Active

Administration
- Province: Canterbury
- Diocese: St Albans
- Archdeaconry: Bedford
- Deanery: Biggleswade

Clergy
- Vicar: Rev Alex Wheatley

The Parish Church of St Mary is the Anglican parish church for Potton in Bedfordshire. It has been a Grade I listed building since 1966 and comes under the Diocese of St Albans.

== Design ==
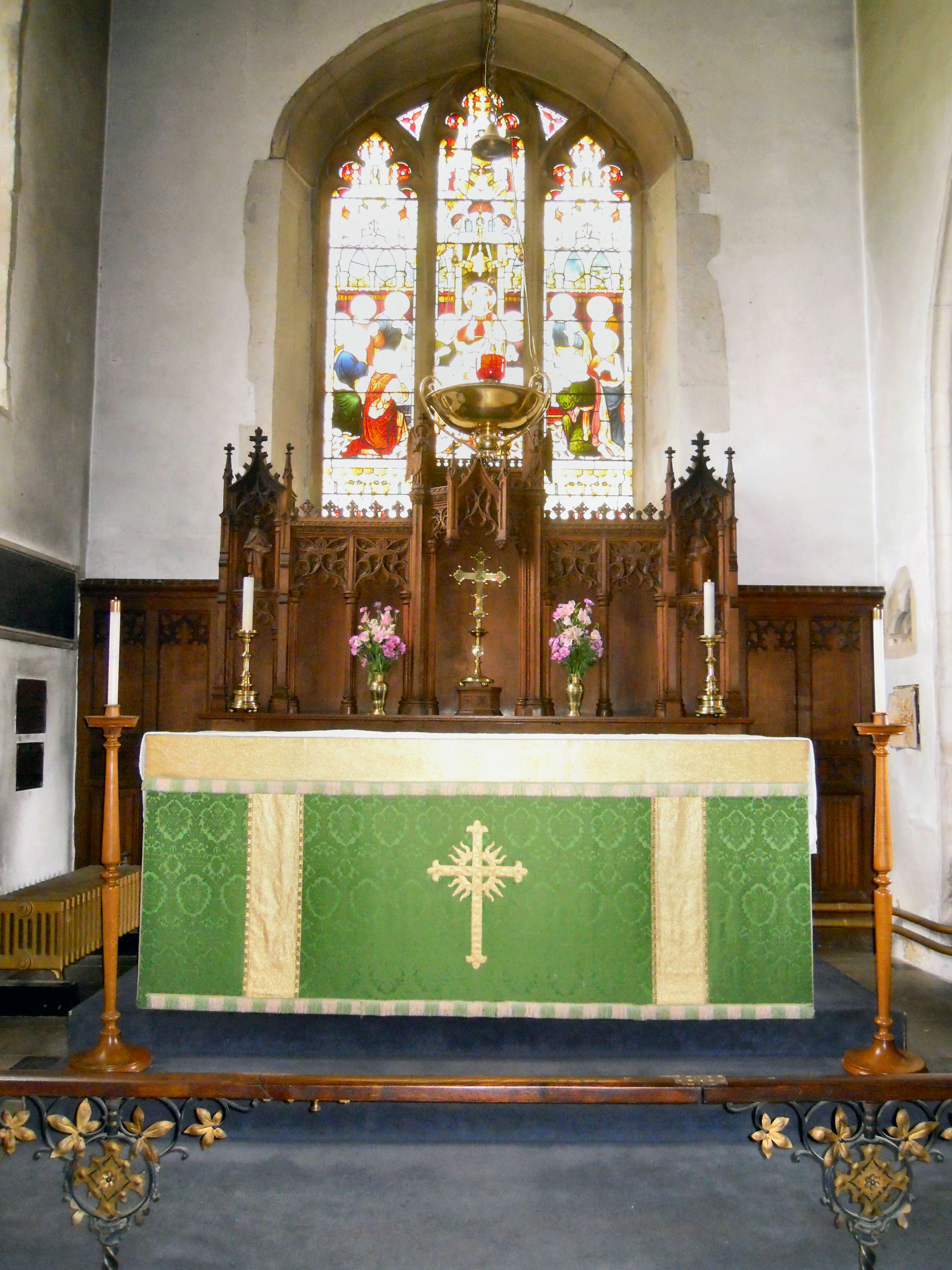
The Sanctuary

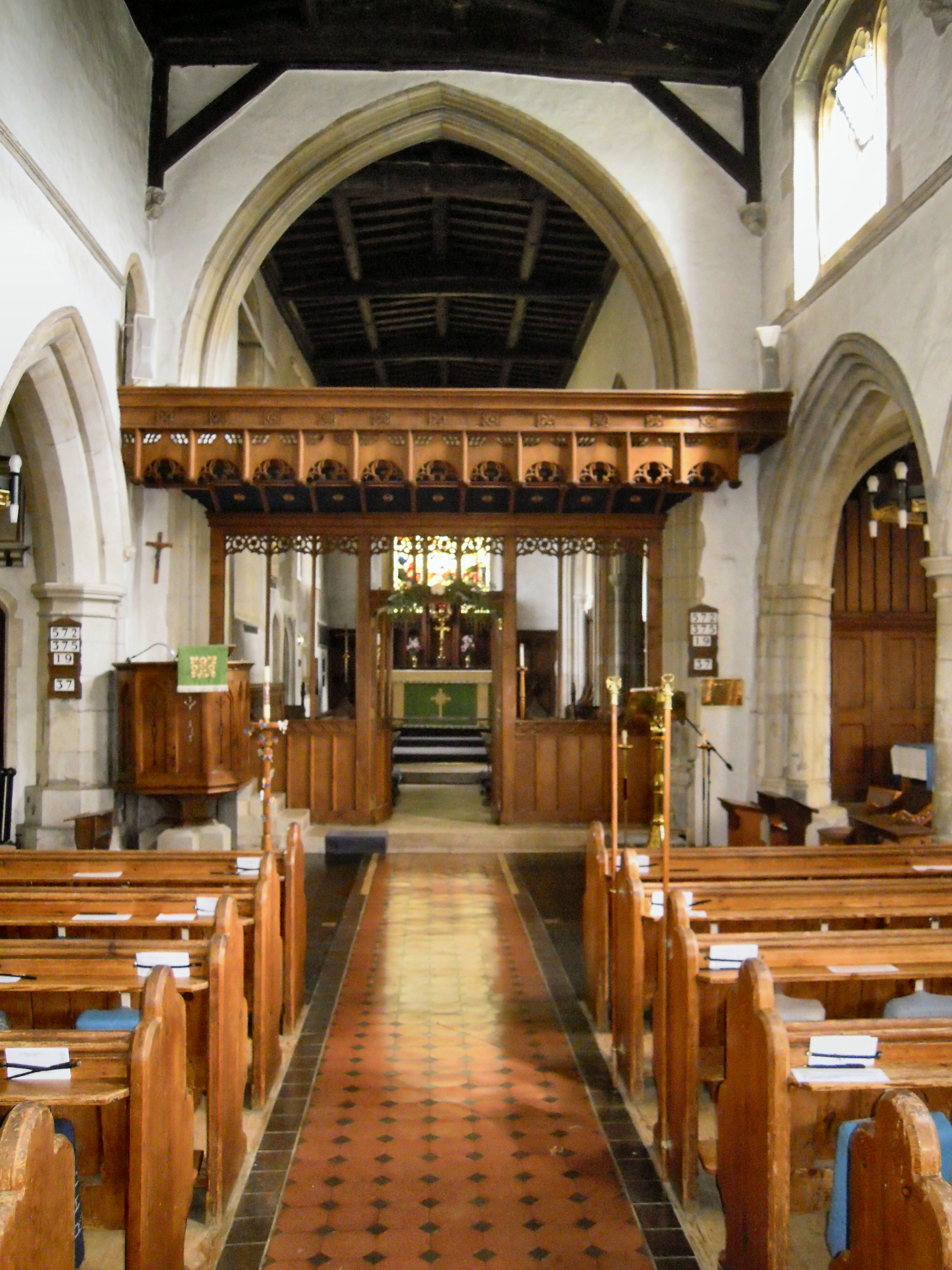
View up the nave towards the East

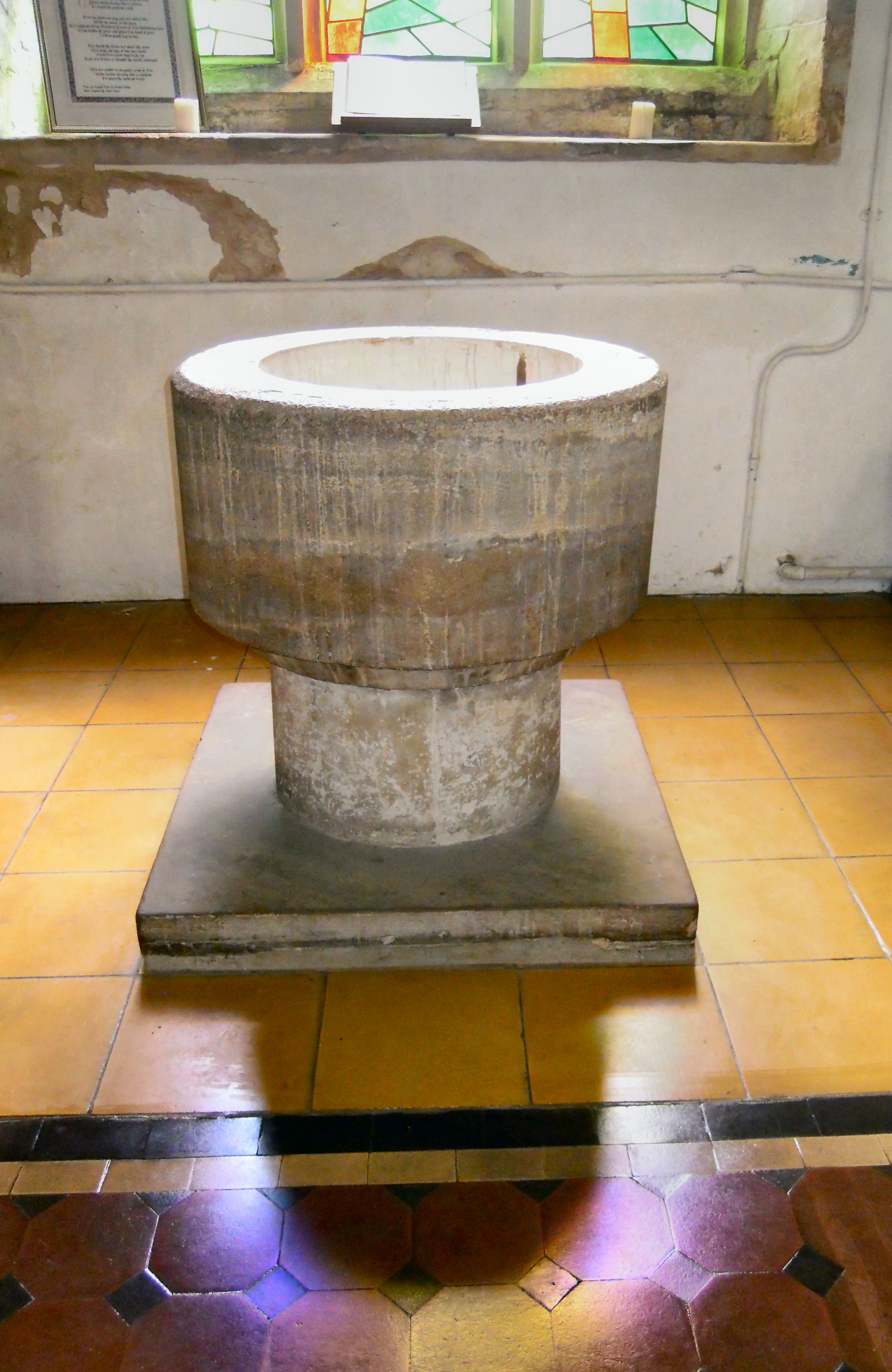
The circular baptismal font

There has been a church on the site since the 11th century but the present structure is 13th-century in origin, with 14th-, 15th- and early 16th-century additions and is built of cobblestones and ironstone with ashlar dressings with a mixture of plain and embattled parapets. It has a chancel, South chapel, nave, North transept, North and South aisles, North porch and West tower. The chancel dates to the 13th century but was reworked in the 15th century; the chancel has a 19th-century pointed-arched three-light East window and a 16 arch two-bay South arcade. The North elevation has a square-headed three-light window to the East and a four-centre headed two-light window the West, both dating to the 15th century. Between these is a four-centred arched doorway with a small 13th-century lancet window above. Below the North East window is a piscina moved here from the North East vestry.

The South chapel dates to the 16th century and has two windows in the South and one East window, all of three lights. Originally there was a vestry to the north side of the chancel dating to the 15th century but this was demolished in the 16th century. The four-centred South doorway is 19th-century. The nave has elements dating to the 13th century but is mainly 14th-century in date and has five-bay 14th-century arcades to both sides; the South one is earlier in date with compound piers while the North arcade has octagonal columns. The clerestory has five 15th-century square-headed windows to each side, all of two lights except for the South East one which has three lights.

The North transept is 13th-century in origin with the East elevation having a 15th-century three-light four-centre arched window, and a small window to the South East lighting inserted in the 15th-century rood screen stair. The North aisle is 14th-century reworked in the 15th century while the North doorway is 14th-century. The South aisle is 14th-century reworked in the 15th century. The West window and three South windows are all 15th-century. The North porch is 15th-century with a room above with two-light square-headed windows to the West and North and which is reached by stairs at the South East corner.

The West tower is 15th-century with a semi-circular stair turret projecting from the North East angle. The West elevation has a 19th-century pointed-arched doorway to the ground stage and a three-light four-centred arched window to the second stage. On the tower's North side the remains of a stone lamp holder are still visible about 12 feet up. The belfry level has pointed-arched two-light windows to all sides. All the roofs were repaired in the 19th century but retain much of the original moulded timbering with that to the South aisle being 14th-century, with those elsewhere being 15th and 16th century. The pews are 19th-century while the circular baptismal font is of uncertain date. The East wall of the porch retains the indents of a memorial brass to a priest, with the central indent in the shape of a chalice.

The church was restored in 1889 by Somers Clarke and J. T. Micklethwaite.

== Windows ==
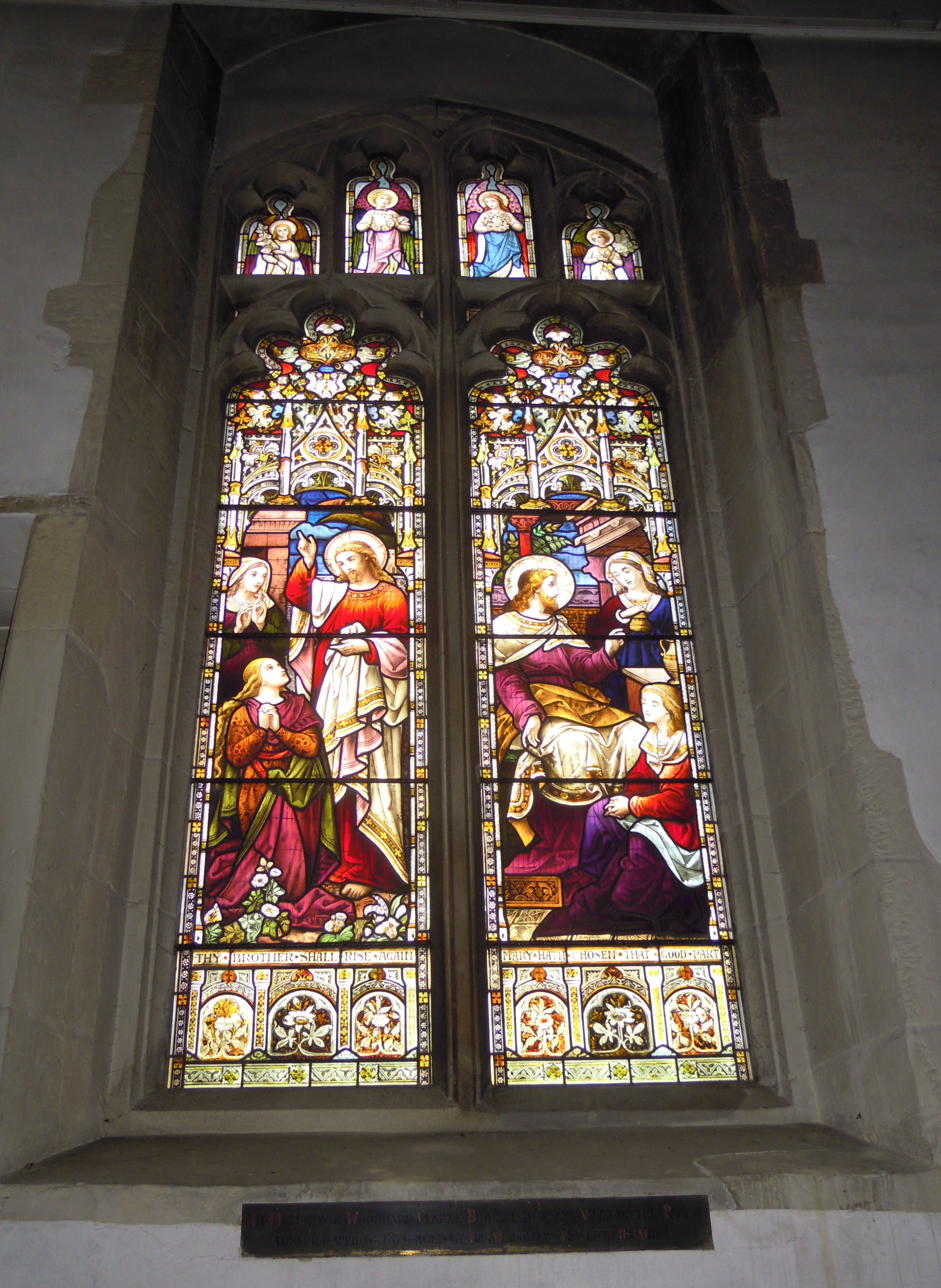
The window in memory of Rev George Bidwell

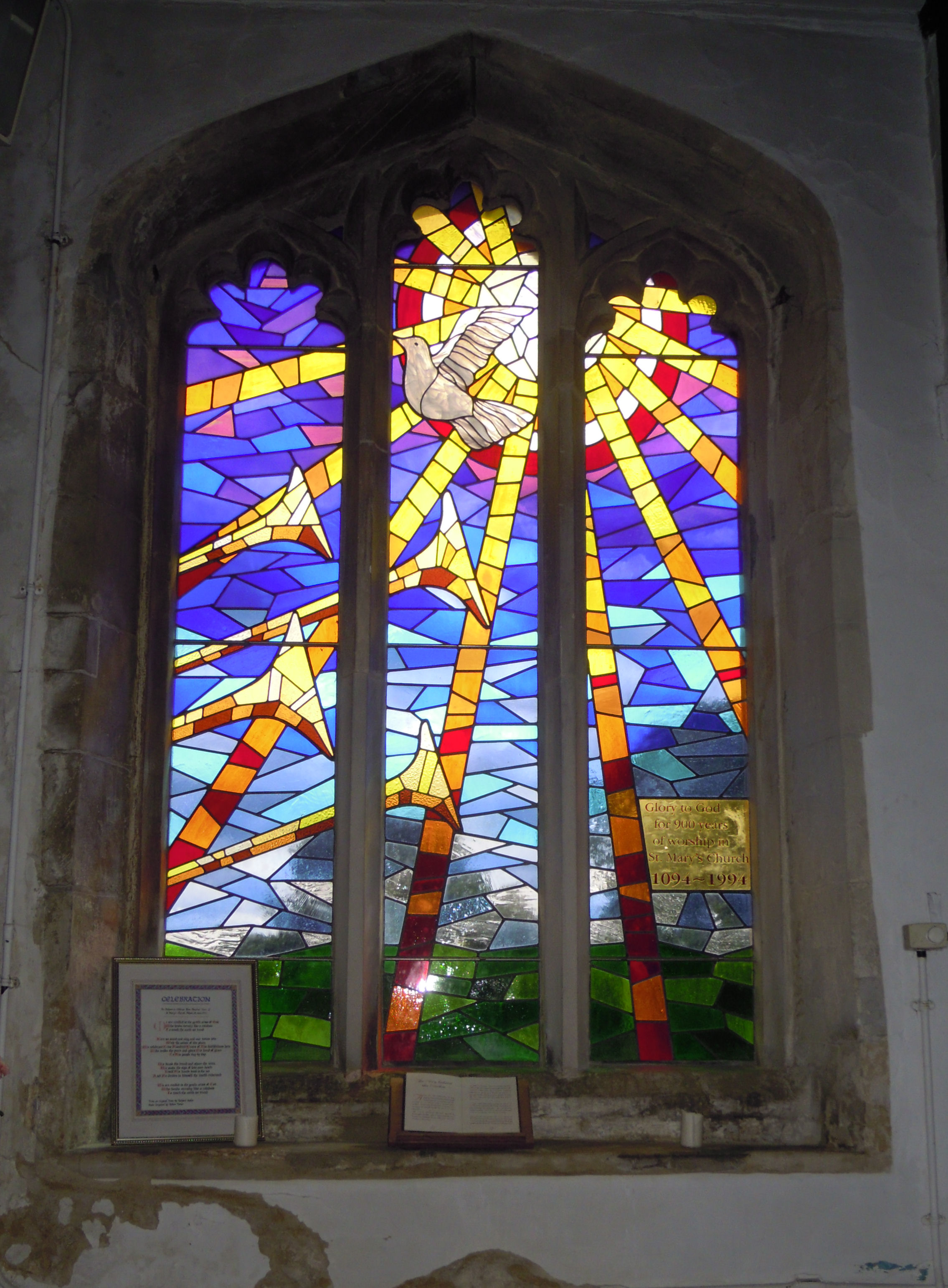
The modern window by Carl Russell

The glass in the church is mainly Victorian in date and of little artistic merit. The East window consists of three lights containing glass depicting the Last Supper installed in 1888 in memory of James Wagstaff. The pair of windows in the West are 15th-century with a tall two light window and a single lancet-shaped window lower down. The larger of the windows was installed in 1865 in memory of the Rev George Bidwell and portrays the Nativity, Crucifixion and Resurrection of Christ with the figures of Christ and Mary Magdalene depicted in the Garden of Gethsemane.

The stained glass in the north window of the transept was installed in 1892 in memory of Elizabeth Wagstaff of Potton (1800-1892), the widow of the James Wagstaff who is similarly commemorated in the East window. The window depicts Christ in conversation with the Woman at the Well. The colourful modern glass in the central window of the South aisle depicting the Holy Spirit as a dove emerging from the rays of the sun above angel's trumpets was designed by Carl Russell and was installed in 1994 in celebration of 900 years of worship in the church,
