= Shannon Express =

British male barbershop chorus

- Origin: Potton, Bedfordshire
- Genres: A capella
- Works: Shannon Expressions
- Years active: 1978 – 2025
- Website: shannonexpress.org.uk

Shannon Express was a male barbershop chorus based in Potton, Bedfordshire, England. The chorus formed in 1978 and twice won the British Association of Barbershop Singers (BABS) gold medal, in 1995 and 1998. The chorus met every Thursday from 7.30pm to 10.15pm at Potton Lower School.

The group was named after the original engine that ran on the railway from Potton to Sandy and whose construction was begun by Sir William Peel and opened in 1857.

A sister chorus is the Phoenix Ladies Showcase Chorus.

In 2025 Shannon Express merged with Ouse Valley Chorus to form A1 Acappella.

== Discography ==
- Shannon Expressions
