= British Association of Barbershop Singers =

British organization

- Genres: Barbershop music
- Years active: 1974–present
- Website: www.singbarbershop.com

The British Association of Barbershop Singers (BABS) is a British organisation of male barbershop singers. It was formed in 1974 and is affiliated with the Barbershop Harmony Society. Since 2023, BABS and its female counterpart in the UK, the Ladies' Association of British Barbershop Singers, have been in talks to consider proposals to work more closely together.

Every year the association runs contests in parallel for barbershop choruses (male and mixed-gender) and quartets as part of the BABS Annual Convention. The British convention is the largest barbershop convention of its kind outside of North America. The chorus competitions are currently each held on a single day, while the quartet competition is spread over the convention weekend (with a preliminary round to eliminate all but the top 16 quartets usually held about 6 months prior to the semi-finals).

Concurrent with the national quartet contest, BABS holds an International Quartet Qualifying Contest, which past BABS gold medal quartets may also enter, to determine qualification for the next year's BHS International Quartet contest. In conjunction with the preliminary quartet contest, BABS also holds Seniors Quartet and Youth Quartet contests; BHS is asked to permit the respective winners to compete in the subsequent corresponding international contest, subject to a qualifying score.

National contest winners (in the categories of chorus and quartet) by year are as follows: See also, the List of British Association of Barbershop Singers quartet champions for further detail.

Year	Chorus	Quartet	Youth Quartet	Seniors Quartet	Mixed Chorus
2026	Meantime Chorus	Overtime	Live Lounge	The Artful Codgers	Endeavour
2025	Cottontown Chorus	The 1234	The Six Foot Four	The Old Romantics	Lux A Cappella
2024	Meantime Chorus	Fifth Element	Ami Quartet	Mixed Blessings	Crucible Vocal Project
2023	Cottontown Chorus	Trailblazers	The Breakfast Club	Midnight Train	Bristol A Cappella
2022	Meantime Chorus	Limelight	Hot Ticket	Crown Derby	The Bristol Mix
2021	No competition				
2020	No competition				
2019	Hallmark of Harmony	Sound Hypothesis	Apollo II	Bagatelle	A Kind of Magic
2018	Cottontown Chorus	The Locksmiths	Northern Quarter	One Foot in the Stave	Momentum
2017	The Great Western Chorus of Bristol	Portobello Road	Sound Hypothesis	Three 'n' Easy	EQMC
2016	Cottontown Chorus	Finest Hour	4 On Demand	South Parade	Strictly A Cappella
2015	The Great Western Chorus of Bristol	Tagline	Trailblazers	The Grand Dads	
2014	Hallmark of Harmony	Park Street	Proper Sound	Figaro	
2013	Cottontown Chorus	The Emerald Guard	Park Street	Soundcheck	
2012	The Grand Central Chorus	iQ	Mach 4	Just In Time	
2011	Cottontown Chorus	Crossfire	Mach 4	Rockaholix	
2010	The Great Western Chorus of Bristol	Steel			
2009	Cottontown Chorus	Evolution			
2008	The Great Western Chorus of Bristol	Monkey Magic			
2007	Cottontown Chorus	Q.E.D.			
2006	Cambridge Chord Company	Pitch Invasion			
2005	Cottontown Chorus	The Works			
2004	Cambridge Chord Company	Prime Time			
2003	The Grand Central Chorus	Sound Crew			
2002	Cambridge Chord Company	The Light Industrial Choral Society			
2001	The Grand Central Chorus	Matrix			
2000	Hallmark of Harmony	The Likely Lads			
1999	Cambridge Chord Company	Shockwave			
1998	Shannon Express	Chordial Exchange			
1997	Hallmark of Harmony	Cambridge Blues			
1996	The Grand Central Chorus	Hooked On Harmony			
1995	Shannon Express	Smilin' Thru			
1994	Hallmark of Harmony	Sound Assembly			
1993	The Grand Central Chorus	Island Engagement			
1992	Rainy City Chorus	Quattro			
1991	Hallmark of Harmony	Talk Of The Town			
1990	The Great Western Chorus of Bristol	Curtain Call			
1989	Hallmark of Harmony	Quartz Precision			
1988	The Great Western Chorus of Bristol	High Time			
1987	Pilgrimaires	Times Square			
1986	Hallmark of Harmony	Junction 33			
1985	Pilgrimaires	Gilt Edge			
1984	Crawley Chordsmen	On Spec			
1983	The Great Western Chorus of Bristol	Mancunian Way			
1982	Roker Peers	Limited Company			
1981	The Great Western Chorus of Bristol	Regency Pride			
1980	The Great Western Chorus of Bristol	Par Four			
1979	No competition				
1978	Crawley Chordsmen	Newtown Ringers			
1977	The Great Western Chorus of Bristol	Fortunairs			
1976	Crawley Chordsmen	The Barrytones			
1975	Crawley Chordsmen	Five Bridge Four			
1974	No competition	Ringleaders			
