= Cottontown Chorus =

English a cappella group

Cottontown Chorus is a male a cappella group from Bolton, England, formed in 1979. The group is affiliated with the British Association of Barbershop Singers (BABS) and has won the BABS gold medal in the category for national chorus nine times since 2005 getting closer to the record of The Great Western Chorus of Bristol who have won the gold medal ten times although Director, Neil Firth, holds the record for number of championships directed by one person (seven).
