= BigglesFM =

Biggles FM
- England
- Broadcast area: Biggleswade, Potton, Sandy Bedfordshire, available worldwide through the internet
- Frequency: 104.8 FM

Programming
- Format: Pop, Modern adult contemporary

Ownership
- Owner: BigglesFM Ltd

History
- First air date: (RSL) June, 2002 (Full-Time) 22 April 2011

Technical information
- ERP: 50w Vertical & Horizontal Polarization
- Transmitter coordinates: 52.126°N 0.225°W

Links
- Website: BigglesFM.com

BigglesFM is a local radio station based in Potton. It started broadcasting a full-time service on 22 April 2011.

The station plays both modern and older songs. It broadcasts on 104.8 FM to Biggleswade, Potton, Sandy and surrounding villages in Mid Bedfordshire. It is also available through Wi-Fi radio and the internet.

== History ==
BigglesFM was started in June 2002 by Alan Waring with a 17-day Restricted Service Licence broadcasting on 87.9 FM to coincide with and promote the Biggleswade Carnival. Following its success, a second broadcast followed in December 2002. BigglesFM was back on air in the summer of 2003 and then twice a year until December 2010. Between 2002 and 2010 BigglesFM completed sixteen RSL broadcasts, each for a maximum 28 days' duration.

In 2008 community radio applications were invited by OFCOM for the BigglesFM area. An application was put in by Alan to cover the local area.

It was announced in April 2009 that the application from BigglesFM for a Community Radio Licence was successful and the station was given two years to commence full-time broadcasting.

In September 2009 OFCOM issued the permanent frequency of 104.8 FM. The station continued with its RSL broadcasts on this new frequency until everything could be tested and put into place for launching a full-time service on Friday 22 April 2011.

== Programming ==
Live programmes start with the Breakfast Show at 6:30am every weekday morning - 7am at the weekend. The station offers a wide range of specialist programmes to suit all tastes including: Soul and Motown, Rock 'n' Roll, Old Style Radio, Disco, California Sounds and Classical. The current schedule can be found on the website.
