= Hatley, Cambridgeshire =

Civil parish in Cambridgeshire, England

Coordinates: 52.1427°N 0.1288°W

Hatley
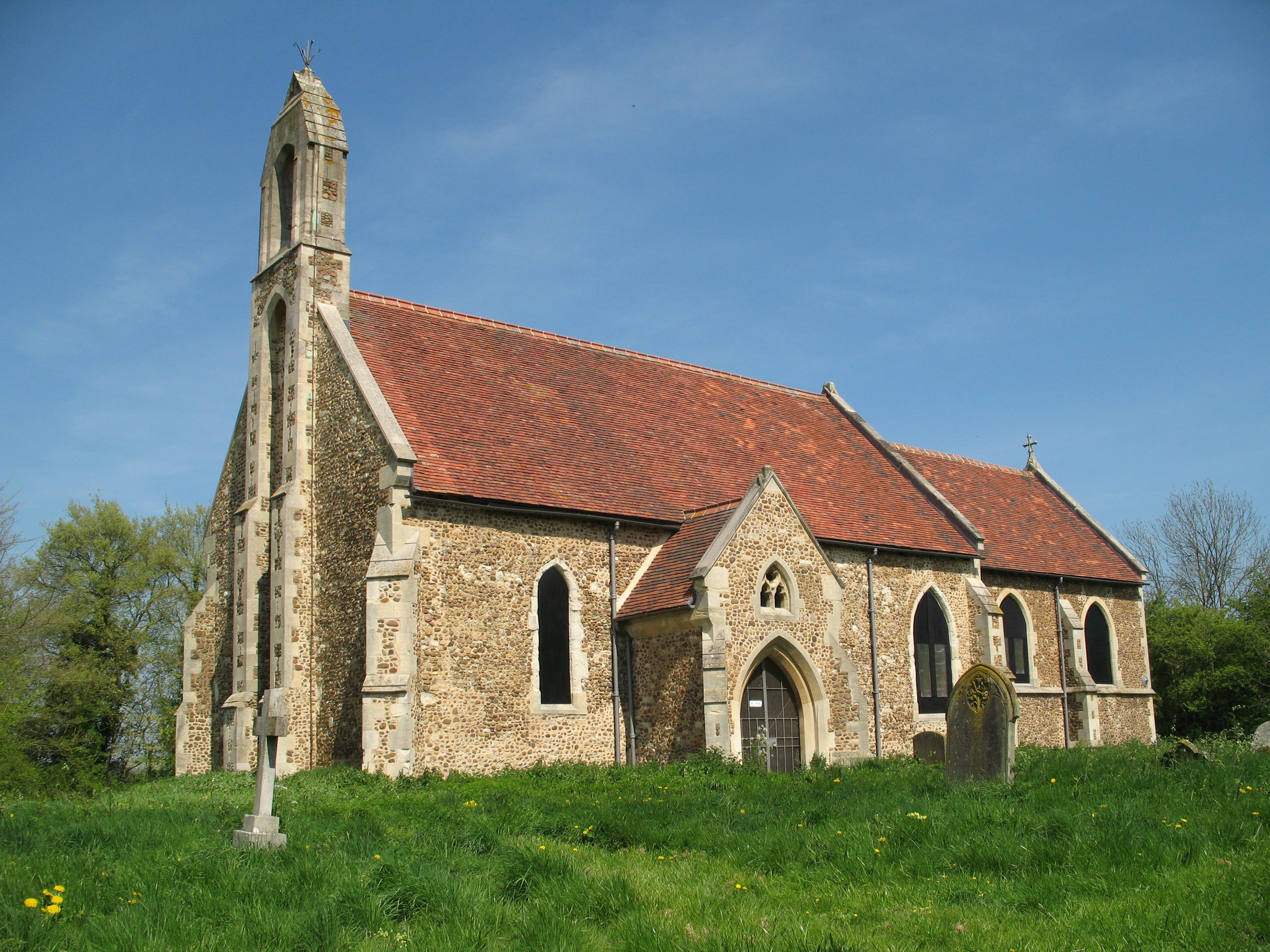
- Church of St Denis, East Hatley

- Location within Cambridgeshire
- Population: 181 (2011)
- OS grid reference: TL281510
- District: South Cambridgeshire
- Shire county: Cambridgeshire
- Region: East
- Country: England
- Sovereign state: United Kingdom
- Post town: SANDY
- Postcode district: SG19
- Dialling code: 01767
- Police: Cambridgeshire
- Fire: Cambridgeshire
- Ambulance: East of England
- UK Parliament: South Cambridgeshire

Hatley is a civil parish in South Cambridgeshire, England. It lies between the villages of Gamlingay and Croydon, 12 miles south-west of the city of Cambridge and eight miles south-east of the town of St Neots. In 2001, the population of Hatley parish was 205 people living in 77 households, reducing at the 2011 Census to a population of 181 in 78 households.

== History ==
The Hatley name was in use as early as 986, derived from 'laie' or 'ley', a woodland clearing, or 'woodland clearing on the hill'. The spelling Hatelaie was used in the 1086 Domesday Book. The parishes were known as 'Hungry Hatley' by 1218, possibly because the clay soil could not be cultivated effectively until mechanisation in the 20th century. The adjoining parish of Cockayne Hatley, in Bedfordshire, is said to be unconnected to the Cambridgeshire Hatleys.

In 1831, the population of the parish of Hatley St George was 105 people. At the time of the census in 1921, it was 67 people.

== Governance ==
The parish was established in 1957 when the parish of Hatley St George was united with East Hatley. Hatley Parish Council comprises five elected members (a chairman, vice-chairman and three others) and a clerk. The parish is represented on the South Cambridgeshire District Council by one councillor for The Mordens ward and on Cambridgeshire County Council by one councillor for the Gamlingay electoral division. It is represented at the House of Commons as part of the South Cambridgeshire constituency.

== Geography ==
Hatley is 12 miles south-west of the county town of Cambridge and 45 miles north of London. The elevation ranges between 55 and 79 metres (180–260 feet) above sea level. The soil is clay subsoil with boulder clay. The parish covers an area of 958 hectares.

Around half of the land in Hatley parish belongs to the Hatley Park Estate. 76% of land is used for crops or fallow land; 9.5% is covered by grass, 4.9% by woodland and 7.1% by set-aside. Wheat, barley and rapeseed are grown. In summer, the estate's parkland is grazed by beef cattle and by sheep in winter. The yard at Church Farm, owned by the estate, has been converted to small business units. One other farm is in the parish and two neighbouring farmers use land in it.

There are two main settlements in the parish, connected by a minor road. Hatley St George consists of a row of houses along the Gamlingay-Croydon road. It has a small shop and post office, (subsidised by the estate) a playing field, playground and cricket club. It is presumed that the hamlet's name is derived from that of the St George family, who were the principal landowners from the 13th century to 1658. Hatley St George is an 'estate village' – Hatley Park Estate owns all the houses except for five. About a third are used for current and retired estate workers, with the others rented out.

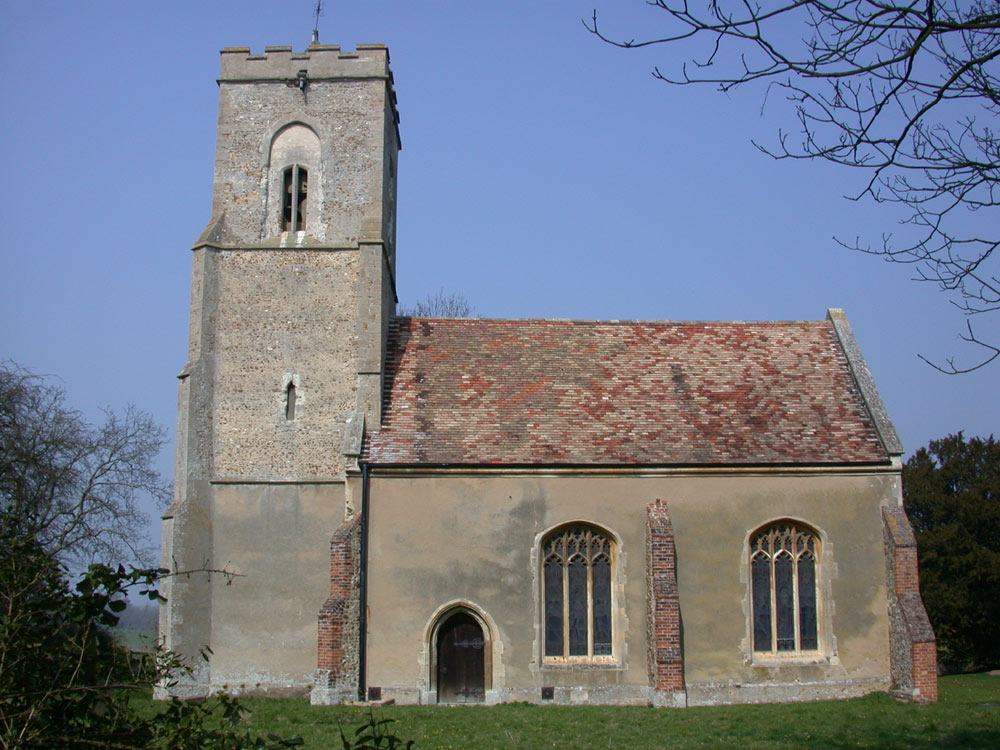
Church of St George

East Hatley is a row of houses along a smaller road. It was formerly known as Castell Hatley. In 1929, the hamlet was owned by the Master and Fellows of Downing College, Cambridge. Sir George Downing, 1st Baronet, after whom Downing Street is named, owned land in East Hatley (his grandson, Sir George Downing, 3rd Baronet, founded Downing College).

Historically, East Hatley housed local farm labourers. Now, few agricultural workers live there and it has been described as a 'small, middle-class commuter settlement'. The houses are mainly privately owned but there are three council-owned bungalows. There is little interaction between East Hatley and Hatley St George.

Hatley village hall was built by the estate in 1960. It was run as a social club before it became financially unviable, closing in 2005, and is now run by the Parish Council.

Around one-third of the parish is occupied by Hatley Park, an area of private landscaped parkland south of the road, formerly owned by Sir John Astor MBE.

== Demography ==
At the time of the 2001 census, the population of Hatley parish was 205 people living in 77 households. The ethnic group of 98.6% of Hatley residents was white and 1.4% Asian or Asian British. 73.7% described themselves as Christian.

Hatley has a high rate of in-migration and commuting, and retains economically strong farming activities. Hatley Park once employed most Hatley St George residents. There was formerly a Thoroughbred stud farm in Hatley Park, employing 15 people, but it is now a livery yard staffed by two for most of the year. Seven Hatley St George residents were employed on the estate in 2007; a number of people work for the Royal Society for the Protection of Birds, whose headquarters is nearby at Sandy, Bedfordshire. At the time of the 2001 census, 17.7% of Hatley residents were self-employed, 2.1% were unemployed and 4% were employed in agriculture.

== Landmarks ==
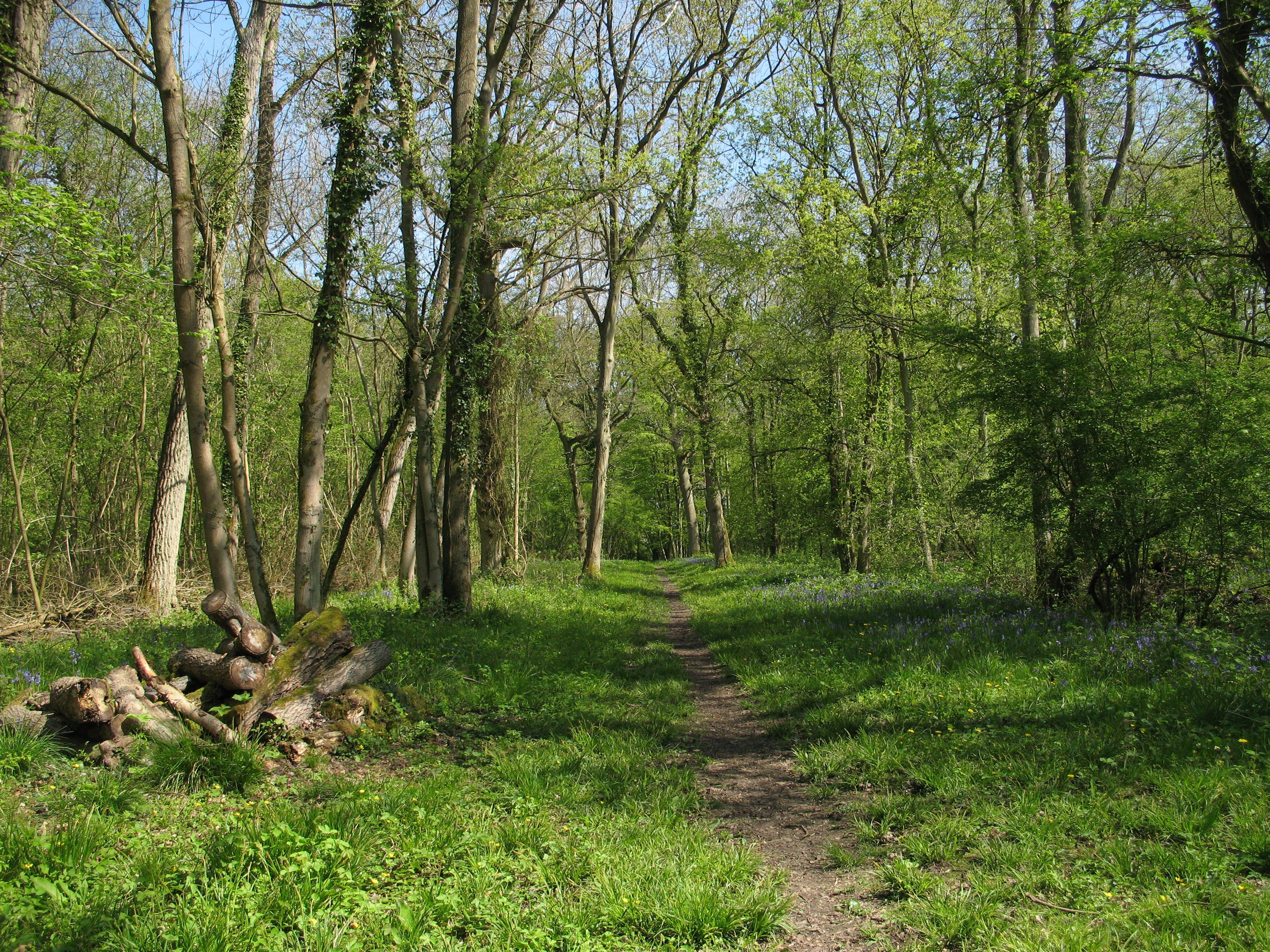
Buff Wood

In addition to the two churches, two buildings in Hatley parish are listed: Hatley Park Lodge and model farm buildings at Church Farm, Hatley St George.

Hatley St George has a church, dedicated to St George, which was first built in 1352. It is a Grade II* listed building. Services take place every two weeks. East Hatley's church, dedicated to St Denis, has been disused since 1980. It is also a Grade II* listed building. Hatley's churches are part of the ecclesiastical parish of Gamlingay with Hatley St George and East Hatley, in the diocese of Ely.

There are remnants of ancient woodland: Buff Wood, south-west of East Hatley, is a Site of Special Scientific Interest (SSSI) owned by the estate and managed by the local Wildlife Trust, and Hayley Wood, another SSSI, borders the parish in the north.

== See also ==
- List of places in Cambridgeshire
