= Sarah Dazley =

English suspected Murderer

Sarah Dazley (c. 1819 – 5 August 1843), later known as The Potton Poisoner, was an English murderer convicted of the poisoning of her husband William Dazley. She was suspected of, but not tried for, the poisoning of her first husband Simeon Mead and their son Jonah Mead in 1840. The murder of William Dazley took place in Wrestlingworth, England. It is reported that she is the last female to be publicly hanged in England.

== Early life ==
Dazley was born in about 1819 in Potton, Bedfordshire as Sarah Reynolds. She was the daughter of the town barber Philip Reynolds and his wife Ann Reynolds. When she was 7, her father died and her mother went on to court a series of men. She grew up to be tall with big brown eyes and long auburn hair, and when she was 19 she married Simon Mead. They lived in Potton for two years before moving to Tadlow in 1840. Shortly after the move, she gave birth to their son Jonah, but he became ill and died at only seven months old. In October 1840, Simon Mead died suddenly after complaining of a severe throat infection and stomach pains.

== Murders ==
Soon after the death of her first husband, Sarah married her second husband, William Dazley, in 1841, and they moved to the village of Wrestlingworth. She invited teenage Ann Mead, Simon Mead's daughter, to live with her and her new husband, but he was opposed to the idea. In retaliation, he became an avid drinker and beat his wife. She went on to tell a friend, William Waldock, that she would kill any man who ever hit her.

William Dazley became sick and his wife and her stepdaughter began to take care of him. The local doctor, Dr. Sandell, gave William prescriptions that brought on signs of recovery while under the care of Ann Mead. After seeing this, Dazley began making pills of her own for her husband. Mead didn't notice this as a problem at first. When William refused to take the new pills, Ann took one herself to show him there was nothing wrong. She was not aware that these pills contained arsenic trioxide that Sarah had intentionally added. Once Sarah saw Mead take the pill she scolded her for it. After taking it, Mead became ill and shared similar symptoms with William: vomiting and stomach pains. William eventually decided to take his wife's lethal drugs and died on 30 October 1842.

After his death, suspicion rose against Dazley over the deaths of her two husbands and son. The mother of William demanded a post-mortem investigation be held on her son. The community informed the Bedfordshire coroner of the deaths. The body of William was exhumed and an inquest was held on 1843. William Dazley's body was examined and found to contain traces of arsenic. An arrest warrant was issued for Dazley, who fled to London.

== Conviction ==
After being discovered in London by Superintendent Blunden of Biggleswade Police, Dazley insisted she was innocent of any crimes. She claimed she had no idea about any poisonings and never got hold of poisons or anything of that nature. She was arrested and returned to Bedford. Since the news of William Dazley's death had caused suspicion about the deaths of Jonah and Simeon Mead, their bodies were also exhumed. Traces of arsenic were found in Jonah, but Simeon's body was too decomposed to test.

Sarah Dazley was committed to Bedford Gaol on 24 March 1843 and awaited her trial. She used this time to concoct defenses such as William poisoned himself, or he poisoned Jonah and Simeon, so she poisoned William as revenge for murdering her family.

On 22 July 1843 Sarah Dazley was tried for the murder of William Dazley at Bedfordshire Summer Assizes. She was not tried for the murder of her son Jonah, but the case was kept if the first case against her were to fail. The chemists she bought arsenic from were able to testify against her, as well as Ann Mead and neighbor Mrs. Carver. They told the court what they had seen, including the pill making. William Waldock testified against Dazley about her statement that she would kill any man that hit her, after making claims that William Dazley had hit her. The Marsh test was used to detect the arsenic in William Dazley's body and the result was used as forensic evidence against Dazley. It only took 30 minutes for the jury to convict Dazley for the murder of her second husband.

== Death ==
Judge Baron Alderson sentenced Sarah Dazley to death by hanging. She was executed on Saturday, 5 August 1843, at Bedford Gaol. She was the only woman to be publicly hanged at Bedford Gaol. 12 thousand people came to watch the execution, and she became known as the Potton Poisoner.

== See also ==
- List of serial killers by country
