= The Grand Central Chorus =

British men's chorus

The Grand Central Chorus are members of the British Association of Barbershop Singers. They are five-time BABS National Chorus Champions.

== Contest placement ==
=== BHS International ===
- 1998 – 20th
- 2004 – 18th

=== BABS National ===
Ineligible for one year after each win.

1993	1994	1995	1996	1997	1998	1999	2000
1st			1st				3rd
2001	2002	2003	2004	2005	2006	2007	2008
1st		1st		2nd	2nd	2nd	4th
2009	2010	2011	2012	2013	2014	2015	2016
5th	6th	3rd	1st		5th	3rd	2nd
2017	2018	2019	2020	2021
3rd	2nd	5th	N/A	N/A

== Recordings ==
- Back On Track – (year)
- On The Right Track – (year)

== See also ==
- BABS
