= Potton =

Town in Bedfordshire, England

Coordinates: 52.1271°N 0.2152°W

- Town, civil parish
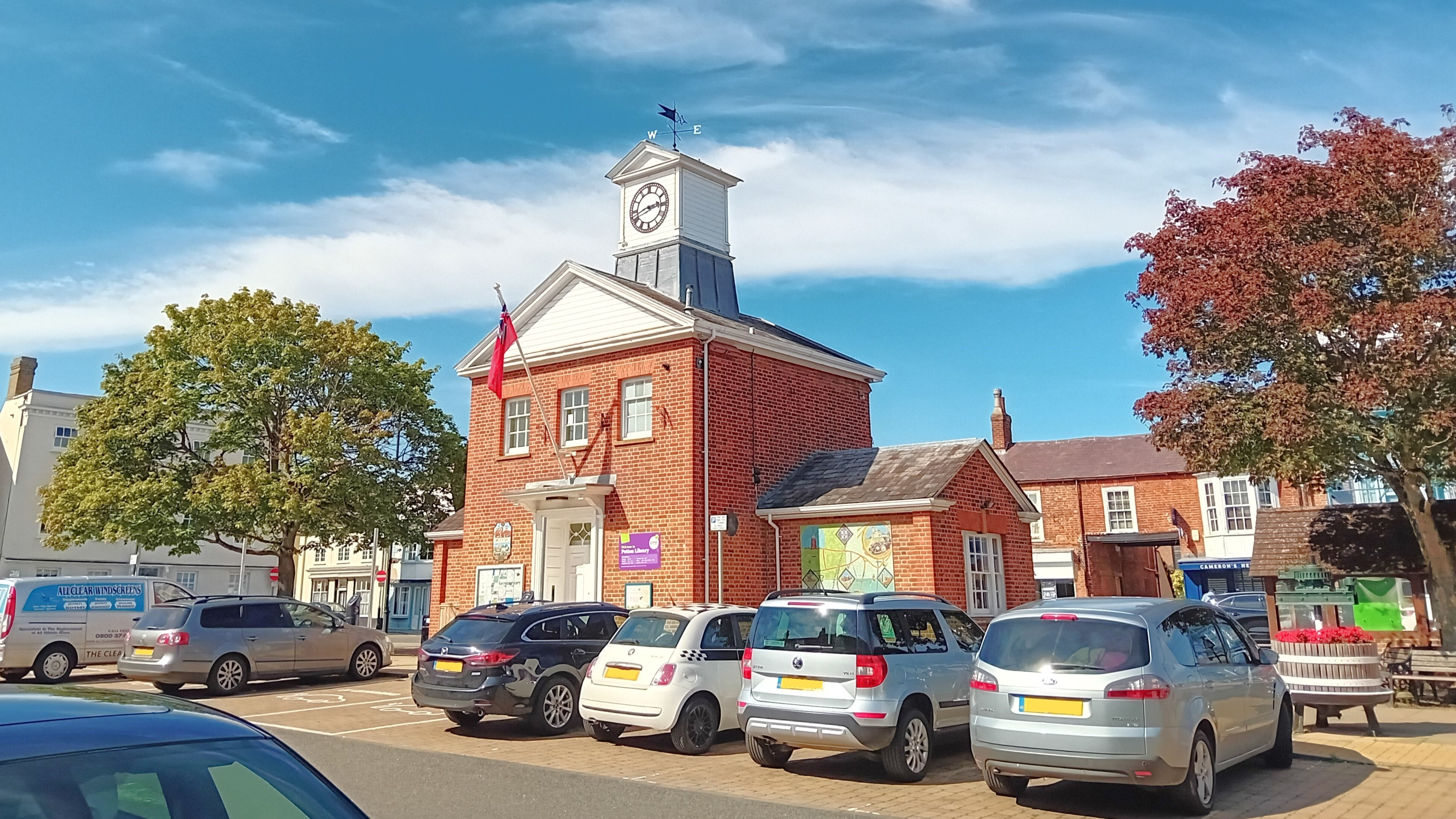
- Clock House in Market Square

- Location within Bedfordshire
- Interactive map showing parish boundary
- Population: 5,728 (2021 census)
- OS grid reference: TL2249
- Unitary authority: Central Bedfordshire
- Ceremonial county: Bedfordshire
- Region: East
- Country: England
- Sovereign state: United Kingdom
- Post town: Sandy
- Postcode district: SG19
- Dialling code: 01767
- Police: Bedfordshire
- Fire: Bedfordshire
- Ambulance: East of England
- UK Parliament: North Bedfordshire

Potton is a town and civil parish in the Central Bedfordshire district of Bedfordshire, England, about 10 miles (16 km) east of the county town Bedford. The parish, which includes the hamlet of Deepdale, had a population of 5,728 in 2021. In 1783 the Great Fire of Potton destroyed a large part of the town. The parish church dates from the 13th century, and is dedicated to St Mary. Potton's horse fairs were some of the largest in the country.

== History ==
The village's name was spelled Pottun in 960 and Potone in the 1086 Domesday Book. It is derived from the Old English for "farmstead where pots are made".

Evidence of early-middle Iron Age settlement in the form of ditches, a pit and sherds of pottery was found in 2009 by archaeologists at Vicarage Farm off the B1042 Gamlingay Road. The parish of Potton underwent parliamentary inclosure twice - once in 1775, and again in 1832.

=== Market and fairs ===
Potton was granted a market charter by William II in 1094. Potton's market was one of the largest in Bedfordshire in the Tudor and Stuart periods, but declined after the Great Fire in 1783. Corn and straw plait were the principal goods in 1831.

A fair was granted by Henry II in 1227. In 1831, fairs were held in January, April, July and October. The town's horse fairs were some of the largest in the country, until they ended in 1932.

The Shambles provided folding market stalls in the town square before brick buildings were put in place by Samuel Whitbread, the lord of the manor, in 1797. They became dilapidated in the 1930s and were demolished after the Second World War. A new library was built in their place, incorporating the old clock from the Shambles with illuminated dials and bell. The library building is called Clock House and was opened on 23 July 1956. It serves as a focal point in the centre of the market square. In spring 2006, the clock mechanism was replaced with an automatic winding system costing £3,000.

=== Great Fire ===
The Great Fire of Potton started in a stack of clover in a field in the area of what is now Spencer Close, in 1783. King Street, half the Market Square and some of the Brook End area were destroyed. It was reported to have burned for a day. Local people raised £6,000 to help those most in need. The 13th-century parish church, St Mary's, survived. Rebuilding after the fire has left the town with a number of Georgian buildings.

=== Railway ===
The Sandy and Potton Railway, also known as Captain Peel's Railway, opened on 9 November 1857. It was established by William Peel, who resided at The Lodge. When the Great Northern Railway came to Sandy in 1850, Peel had a branch line built to his estate and on to Potton. The railway's locomotive was named Shannon, after the frigate Captain Peel was commanding. He never saw his railway; he died of smallpox on 22 April 1858 in India. The engine itself is in the collection of the National Railway Museum and is currently housed at Didcot Railway Centre. The Potton Barbershop Harmony Club named its male chorus 'Shannon Express' after the locomotive.

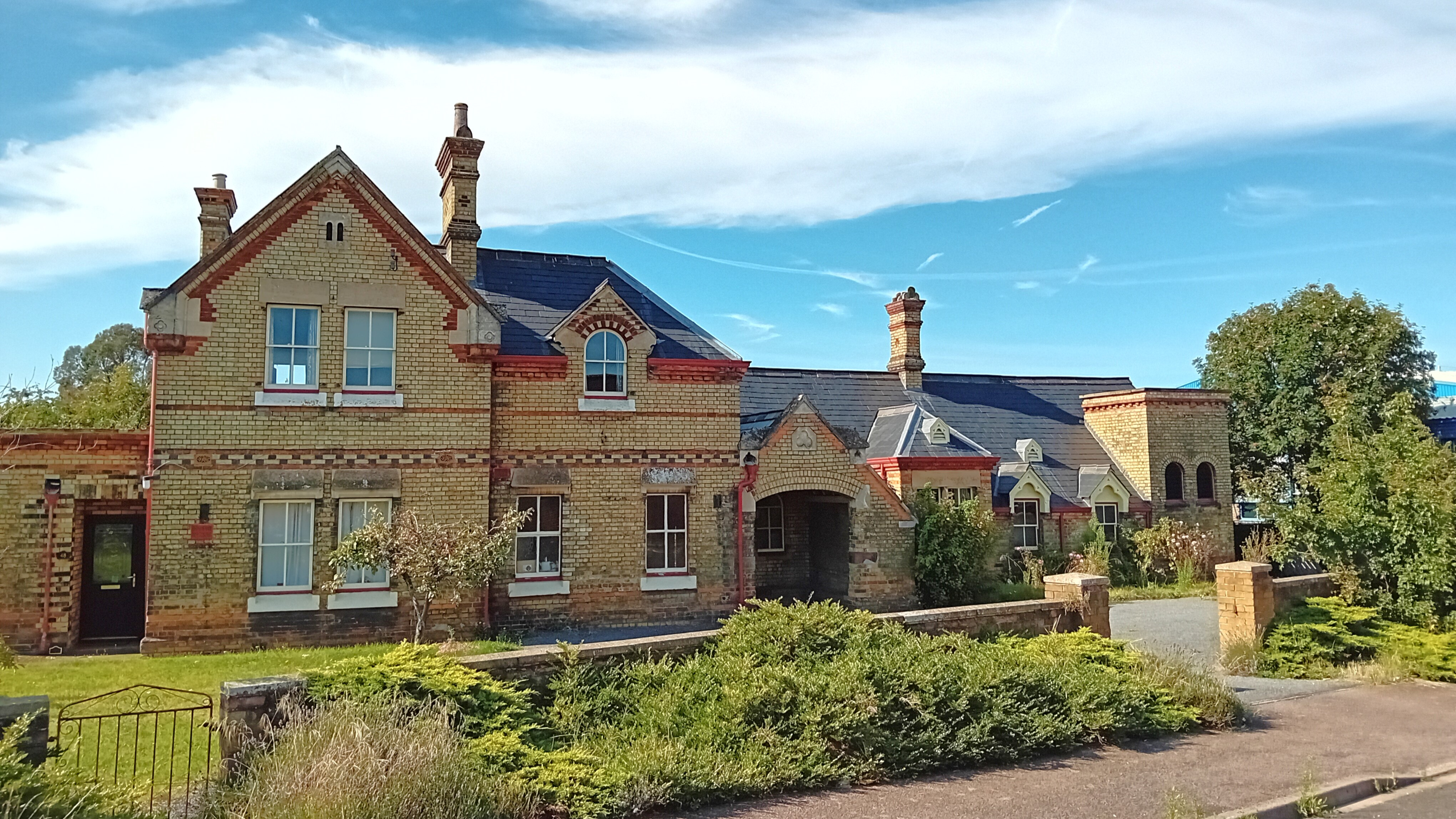
Former Potton railway station buildings, now a house

Potton railway station, which opened in 1862 and served the Varsity Line between Oxford to Cambridge, was closed in 1968. The railway was partly to blame for the decline of Potton market but made London accessible for the district's market gardeners.

=== Potton Manor ===
Potton Manor was built in the 1860s. It was requisitioned by the armed forces and used as a laboratory during the war and as a car factory by Eva Pokorova and Otto van Smekal. The Champion car built in Potton was purchased from the National Motor Museum by Potton History Society, whose aim it is to restore the vehicle to full working order. The house was finally demolished in the early 1980s.

=== Land Settlement Association ===
In March 1935 the first Land Settlement Association (LSA) estate of 30 smallholdings was established to the east of the town along the Wrestlingworth, Sutton and Hatley Roads with land donated by Percy Malcolm Stewart, Potton's last lord of the manor. Its purpose was to resettle unemployed men from coal mining areas in the north of England. Pig and poultry farming plus horticulture were the main activities, augmented by a central farm. Potton provided the model for a further 20 such estates across the country.

=== Air crash ===
On 18 September 1945, a B-24 Liberator bomber crashed on the southern edge of Potton Wood. Four men were killed; the place where it fell can still be seen.

== Geography ==
Potton is 10 miles (16 km) east of the county town of Bedford, 15 miles (24 km) south-west of Cambridge and 43 miles (69 km) north of London. The B1042 road links the town to Sandy and Wrestlingworth and the B1040 to Biggleswade and Gamlingay.

=== Area and landscape classification ===
The parish covers an area of about 1,085 hectares (2,680 acres). Potton Brook flows centrally, north to south through the parish and is the dividing point between two National Character Areas (NCAs) designated by Natural England. West of Potton Brook lies within The Bedfordshire Greensand Ridge (NCA 90). East of the Brook forms part of The Bedfordshire and Cambridgeshire Claylands (NCA 88). Central Bedfordshire Council has further classified the landscape into landscape character areas (LCAs). The town and west of the parish lie on the Everton Greensand Ridge (LCA 6C), land surrounding Potton Brook is part of the Dunton Clay Vale (5G) and Potton Wood and its surrounds are on Cockayne Hatley Clay Farmland (1C).

=== Altitude ===
The town centre is 39 metres (128 ft) above sea level. The land slopes from north to south and reaches a high of 88 metres (289 ft) at Potton Wood in the north-east of the parish.

=== Geology, soil type and land use ===
The town is mainly surrounded by arable farmland. There are areas of woodland to the south-east of the town at Pegnut Wood, alongside Potton Brook at the north-eastern edge of the town and at Potton Wood in the north-east corner of the parish. There is a sand quarry to the north-west of the town.

Potton lies on Potton Sands; a geological formation whose strata date back to the Early Cretaceous age. Dinosaur remains are among the fossils that have been recovered from the formation. There is a band of alluvium along the course of Potton Brook and a strip of gault to the east of the town. Potton Wood lies on boulder clay.

The soil at the centre and west of the parish is of low fertility and is freely draining and slightly acid with a sandy texture. Alongside Potton Brook the soil is loamy and sandy with naturally high groundwater and a peaty texture. East of the brook is a strip of freely draining slightly acid loamy soil. There are highly fertile lime-rich loamy and clayey soils with impeded drainage at and to the south of Potton Wood.

== Demography ==
At the 2021 census, Potton civil parish had a population of 5,728 people in 2,477 households. The Office for National Statistics also define a contiguous Potton built-up area which excludes Deepdale and other outlying dwellings in the parish; at the 2021 census, this had a population of 5,230.

Census population of Potton parish
Census	Population	Female	Male	Households	Source
2001	4,473	2,223	2,250	1,869	
2011	4,870	2,455	2,415	2,083	
2021	5,728	2,932	2,796	2,477	

At the time of the 2001 census, Potton had 4,473 inhabitants living in 1,869 households. The ethnic origin of 95.5% was British. 73.9% were Christian, 1.3% followed another religion and 24.9% stated no religion or were not religious.

== Governance ==
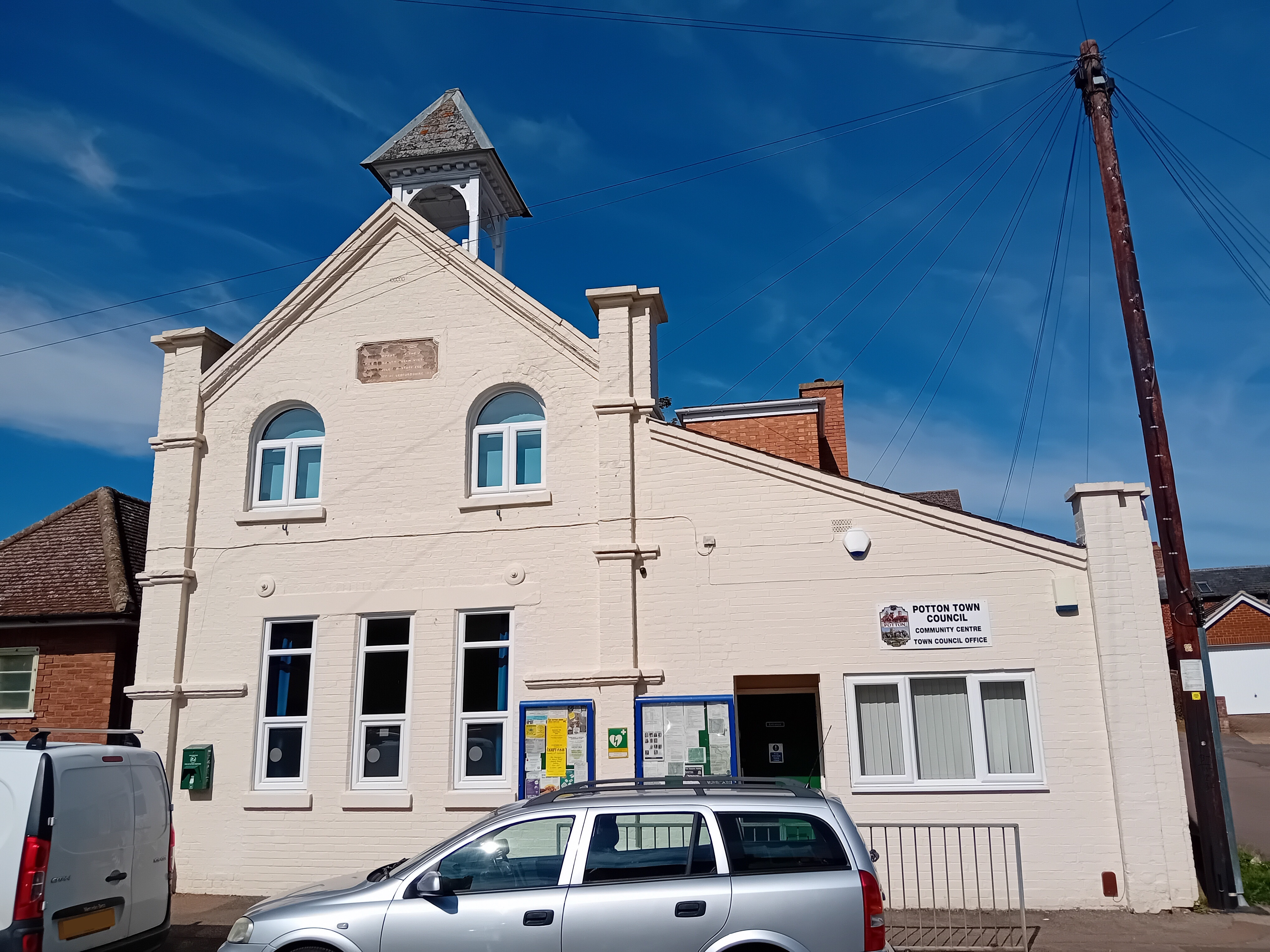
Potton Community Centre, the town council's headquarters

There are two tiers of local government covering Potton, at parish (town) and unitary authority level: Potton Town Council and Central Bedfordshire Council, based at Chicksands.

Potton Town Council has 15 members and meets at the community centre in Brook End. The building was formerly the town's fire station, built in 1887. The town is represented by a single councillor on Central Bedfordshire Council and by Richard Fuller, the Conservative Member of Parliament for North Bedfordshire in the House of Commons.

== Transport ==
Grant Palmer operates a daytime, Monday to Saturday service to Biggleswade and Bedford (service no. 72) and to Moggerhanger and Biggleswade (service 190). A2B Bus and Coach and Ivel Sprinter connect the town to Cambridge.

The nearest railway stations are Sandy and Biggleswade.

== Public services ==
The water supplied by Anglian Water for the Potton public water supply zone (RW50) is chloraminated and classed as hard. The supply comes from groundwater boreholes. There is a waste water treatment works on Biggleswade Road and a water tower on Hatley Road.

Eastern Power Networks, operated by UK Power Networks, is the distribution network operator for electricity. Cadent Gas owns and operates the area's gas distribution network.

The two nearest general hospitals are Bedford Hospital and Lister Hospital, Stevenage. Ambulance services are provided by the East of England Ambulance Service NHS Trust. Bedfordshire Fire and Rescue Service has a station on Bury Hill staffed by retained firefighters.

There is a public library on the Market Square and a post office at Brook End.

== Landmarks ==
A memorial cross to Potton men killed in the First and Second World Wars stands in the cemetery, with a brass plaque bearing the same names in the parish church.

== Media ==
Local news and television programmes are provided by BBC East and ITV Anglia. Television signals are received from the nearby Sandy Heath TV transmitter.

Local radio stations are BBC Three Counties Radio on 95.5 FM, Heart East on 96.9 FM and BigglesFM is a licensed community radio station which broadcasts from the town on 104.8 FM and online. Full-time broadcasting began in April 2011.

The town is served by the local newspaper, The Biggleswade Chronicle.

== Sport and leisure ==
The Henry Smith Playing Field off Brook End on the eastern edge of the town has a children's play area and skate park. Events such as Picnic in the Park and the biennial Party on Potton are hosted.

Potton has a Non-League football club Potton United F.C., which plays at The Hollow. Potton Colts is the local youth football club with teams for children aged 6–16.

Potton Town Cricket Club is also based at The Hollow on Biggleswade Road. Both junior and senior cricket is played. The adult section runs two teams competing in the Saracens Hertfordshire League on Saturdays and the Bedfordshire Cricket League on Sundays. The club also enter midweek competitions.

There is an active history society with a membership of over 100. It meets regularly in the community centre in Brook End.

A multi-purpose community hall was officially opened by Prince Richard, Duke of Gloucester on 28 February 2025.

== Religious sites ==
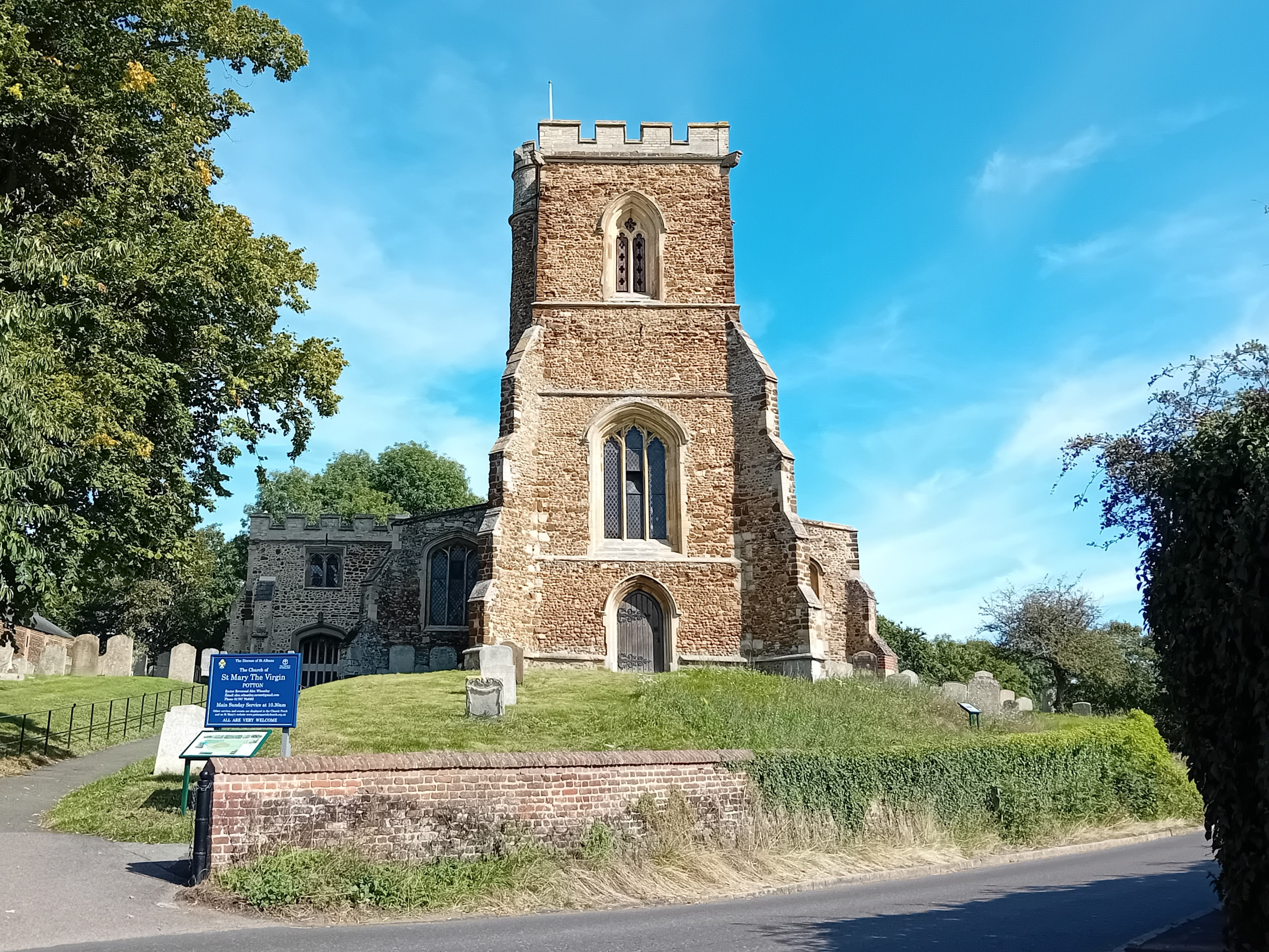
St Mary's Church

The parish church of St Mary's stands a short distance from the town centre on a small hill. It has a chancel, a nave, aisles and north porch, and a western tower with circular turret containing six bells. A separate cemetery was established in 1880, west of the town on the road to Sandy.

== Economy ==
Potton had its own brewery from around 1784 until 1922 when it was bought by the Bedford brewery of Newland & Nash. This company subsequently closed the brewery in Potton and sold the site to the Co-operative Society (the original buildings remain intact). In 1998 brewing returned to Potton when the Potton Brewery Company was re-established, This subsequently closed but reopened in 2017.

A sand quarry operated by Breedon Aggregates lies off The Heath to the north-west of the town. Deepdale Trees operate an extensive tree nursery off Hatley Road and there is an adjacent poultry farm.

Despite local businesses, the town remains very much a commuter town.

== Notable people ==
- Joel Beckett (1973– ), actor, born in Potton
- Sarah Dazley (1819–1843), murderer, known as the "Potton Poisoner"; lived in Potton until 1840
- Freddie Hinds (1999– ), professional footballer who played as a striker for Bristol City
