= The Great Western Chorus of Bristol =

British men's chorus

The Great Western Chorus of Bristol (formerly Great Western Chorus of the Bristol Barbershop Harmony Club, also formerly Western Gateway Chorus, also known as GWC) is a men's a cappella chorus singing primarily in the Barbershop style. It is a founder member of the British Association of Barbershop Singers, with whom the chorus shared its 40th anniversary in 2014. The Great Western Chorus is the most successful chorus in the association.

== History ==
The Great Western Chorus of Bristol was founded in 1974, following a visit by American Barbershop singers to the city.

== Competitions ==
The chorus holds the record for the most gold medals awarded in the BABS national chorus contest, winning for the tenth time in May 2017. In addition to being winners of a record ten BABS gold medals (1977, 1980, 1981, 1983, 1988, 1990, 2008, 2010, 2015 and 2017), the chorus are four times BABS silver medalists and five times bronze medallists and hold more chorus competition medals than any other chorus in the association. They have also always placed within the top five nationally.

The chorus was Radio 3 "Choir of the Year" 2006 finalists and won the men's choir class of the inaugural Barnardo's Adult Choir Competition in 2013.
