= Great Barford Castle =

Castle in Great Barford, Bedfordshire, England

- Part of Creakers Manor
- Great Barford, Bedfordshire, England

Site information
- Type: Castle/manor house
- Open to the public: No
- Condition: Earthworks and cropmarks

Location
- Shown within Bedfordshire
- Location within Bedfordshire
- Coordinates: 52.16466°N 0.38515°W

Site history
- Built: Late 11th to early 12th century
- Demolished: 18th century

Great Barford Castle, later known as Creakers (or Crewker) Manor, was a Norman motte-and-bailey castle to the north of Great Barford in Bedfordshire, England (grid reference TL10555305). The site now survives as earthworks and cropmarks near Creakers Farmhouse and is recorded in the Bedfordshire Historic Environmental Record as HER 818.

The castle formed part of a wider network of Norman fortifications in the region, including Bedford Castle and other nearby sites such as Renhold and Gannock. However, surviving archaeological evidence is limited, and it is more securely identified as the site of the medieval manor of Creakers, with defensive or enclosure features.

== Site and structure ==
Great Barford Castle was constructed as a motte-and-bailey castle, likely built primarily of timber and surrounded by a ditch or moat. The motte would have supported a timber tower, while the bailey enclosed the domestic and service buildings.

Archaeological evidence indicates that the site survives primarily as earthworks, including a low mound and surrounding enclosure features interpreted as the remains of the motte and bailey. These features are consistent with other small Norman castles in Bedfordshire.

Bedfordshire Archives records that a moat located to the west of Creakers Farmhouse may indicate the site of the medieval manor house. The Historic Environment Record (HER 818) describes the earthworks as a curvilinear enclosure set within a larger rectangular enclosure, although the precise function of these features remains uncertain.

It is located within a wider landscape containing other known medieval sites, including Bedford Castle and sites at Renhold and Gannock. Bedfordshire Archives notes that the outer enclosure may represent a defensive feature, while the inner enclosure is of unclear purpose.

== History of Great Barford Castle ==
=== Origins of creakers manor and possible castle phase ===
Great Barford Castle is thought to have been constructed after the Norman Conquest of England, likely in the late 11th or early 12th century. Earlier suggestions that it was built immediately following 1066 have been revised, and it is now considered more likely to post-date the Domesday Book.

The name Creakers derives from the Kentish family of Crevequer or Crewker. Drawing on the Victoria County History for Bedfordshire published in 1912, James de Crevequer held two hides in Great Barford between about 1250 and 1270, and suggests that the estate was probably acquired by marriage to Matilda, daughter and co-heir of Sir John de Bovil. The manor was held from the overlordship of the Barony of Bedford, which remained connected with the estate until the 16th century.

By around 1250 the castle or associated manor was in the possession of James de Crevequer (d. 1263). The estate remained with the de Crevequer family for several generations. His eldest son Robert died in the same year as his father, and it is uncertain whether he ever held the property.

By 1302–1303 the estate was held by James de Crevequer (the younger). In 1346 it was held by John de Crevequer (d. 1370). Upon his death without issue, the estate passed to his nephew Stephen de Crevequer (d. 1370), son of Geoffrey de Crevequer. Stephen died while still a minor, and the estate later passed to his younger brother John de Crevequer upon reaching his majority in 1385.

By the later medieval period, the site had effectively transitioned from a fortified residence to a manorial estate. The manor is stated to be first called Creakers in surviving documents in 1385. The Crevequers remained tenants of the manor until some point in the 15th century, after which it passed to the FitzJeffery family.

=== FitzJeffery family ===
The manor is next recorded in 1511, when it was held by William FitzJeffrey of Thurleigh. Following his death, it passed to his son John FitzJeffrey, and subsequently his widow Joan, who retained possession until her death in 1536.

The estate then passed to George FitzJeffrey. On his death in 1575, it was left to his second wife, Judith Throckmorton, a member of the prominent Throckmorton family. She later married John Rolt of Milton Ernest.

In 1589 the manor transferred to George FitzJeffrey (the younger), who was knighted in 1606. He died in 1618 without surviving heirs, his son having predeceased him in 1616. The estate was subsequently sold when the FitzJeffery family left Bedfordshire in the late 1620s.

=== Garrett, Waite, Chandler, Mander, Pedley and Alington Ownership ===
By 1663 the manor was held by Thomas Garrett. After the death of Garrett's widow in the early 18th century, the estate, then comprising 398 acres, 3 roods and 5 poles, was divided into three equal parts in 1738.

These portions were passed into different ownership. One part was held by Nicholas Waite, another by John Garthorne, and a third was divided among members of the Chandler family and their associates, including Elizabeth Mander, Judith Chandler, and Dame Elizabeth Vanacher Sambrooke.

During the mid-18th century, these divided estates were gradually transferred through a series of conveyances. In 1748 the portion associated with Elizabeth Mander was sold to Mathew Pedley of Great Barford, a maltster. In 1750, John Garthorne's share was conveyed to William Becher of Howbury Hall and William Pedley of Great Barford. Becher's interest was subsequently sold in 1754 by Robert Becher to John Pedley.

By the late 18th and early 19th centuries, ownership had become consolidated within local families. In 1827 one portion of the estate was sold to John Alington of Little Barford, and remained in the Alington family throughout the 19th century.

=== Demolition of the manor house ===
Bedfordshire Archives states that the manor house was demolished shortly before 1738. A deed of that year recorded that the joint owners Henry Waite, Gabriel Westbeer, John Garthorne, Harry Mander and Judith Chandler had agreed that it should be pulled down. This is one of the strongest pieces of evidence for the site's decline as a manorial residence.

=== Present condition ===
The historic manorial site now survives only as slight earthworks and cropmarks in agricultural land near Creakers Farmhouse. No standing castle remains survive, and the surviving evidence is primarily archaeological and topographical rather than architectural. Bedfordshire Archives' use of HER 818 makes clear that the interpretation of the site remains cautious and that much of the visible earthwork had already been levelled by the mid-1970s.

== Creakers farmhouse ==
Creakers Farmhouse is the principal surviving historic building associated with the site. It was listed in August 1983 at Grade II and dates its origins to the 17th century, with much later alteration. The building is described as roughcast over a timber frame, with some brick casing and a clay-tiled roof, and built in an L-shape with an additional wing.

In 1827 the executors of William Pedley offered Creakers for sale as "a valuable freehold estate" of 241 acres and 27 perches with a farmhouse, barn and outbuildings. In 1874, a property valuation have the farm as 245 acres, 1 rood and 12 perches, and in 1876 sale particulars described the house and extensive farm buildings, including stables, cattle sheds, piggeries, a corn barn, granary and mill room with a four-horsepower wind engine. Kelly's Directory recorded Thomas Joyce as tenant in 1894 and 1898. Under the Rating and Valuation Act 1925, the farm was assessed in 1927 as owned by E. A. Allington and occupied by Davison and Logsden, who paid £300 per annum and also farmed Green End Farm and College Farm.
