= Blunham railway station =

Former railway station in Bedfordshire, England

Coordinates: 52.141348°N 0.322346°W

Blunham
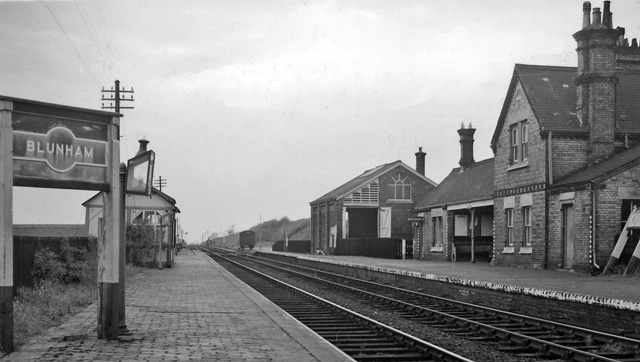
- Blunham Station in 1961

General information
- Location: Blunham, Central Bedfordshire; England
- Grid reference: TL149505
- Platforms: 2

Other information
- Status: Disused

History
- Original company: Bedford & Cambridge Railway
- Pre-grouping: London and North Western Railway
- Post-grouping: London, Midland and Scottish Railway; London Midland Region of British Railways (1948-1958); Eastern Region of British Railways (1958-1968)

Key dates
- 7 April 1862: Opened
- 13 July 1964: Closed to goods
- 1 January 1968: Closed to passengers
Location

Blunham was a railway station on the Varsity Line which served the small village of the same name in Bedfordshire. Opened in 1862, the station was located in a rural area and saw little passenger traffic; it closed together with the line in 1968.

== History ==
Travelling from Oxford in the direction of Cambridge, Blunham was the first station on the Varsity Line which was built in the architectural style of the Bedford & Cambridge Railway, a style which included strong gables in yellow gault brick together with red brick dressings and string courses. As with the other Bedford & Cambridge-built stations with the exception of Potton, the main station buildings were situated on the down side and a wooden shelter served for passengers on the up platform. The two platforms were low and steps were often needed to reach coaches, illuminated at night by the station's oil lamps.

The station had a substantial goods shed which contained a 25cwt crane and sidings controlled by a 20-lever frame signal box. A longer private siding led southwards to Beeson's Mill which produced linseed oil on the banks of the River Ivel. The station like many others on the Bedford & Cambridge's line saw much traffic in vegetables - notably potatoes, leading to special trains being laid on to arrange for the collection of goods for carriage to Bletchley and onward transport to London.

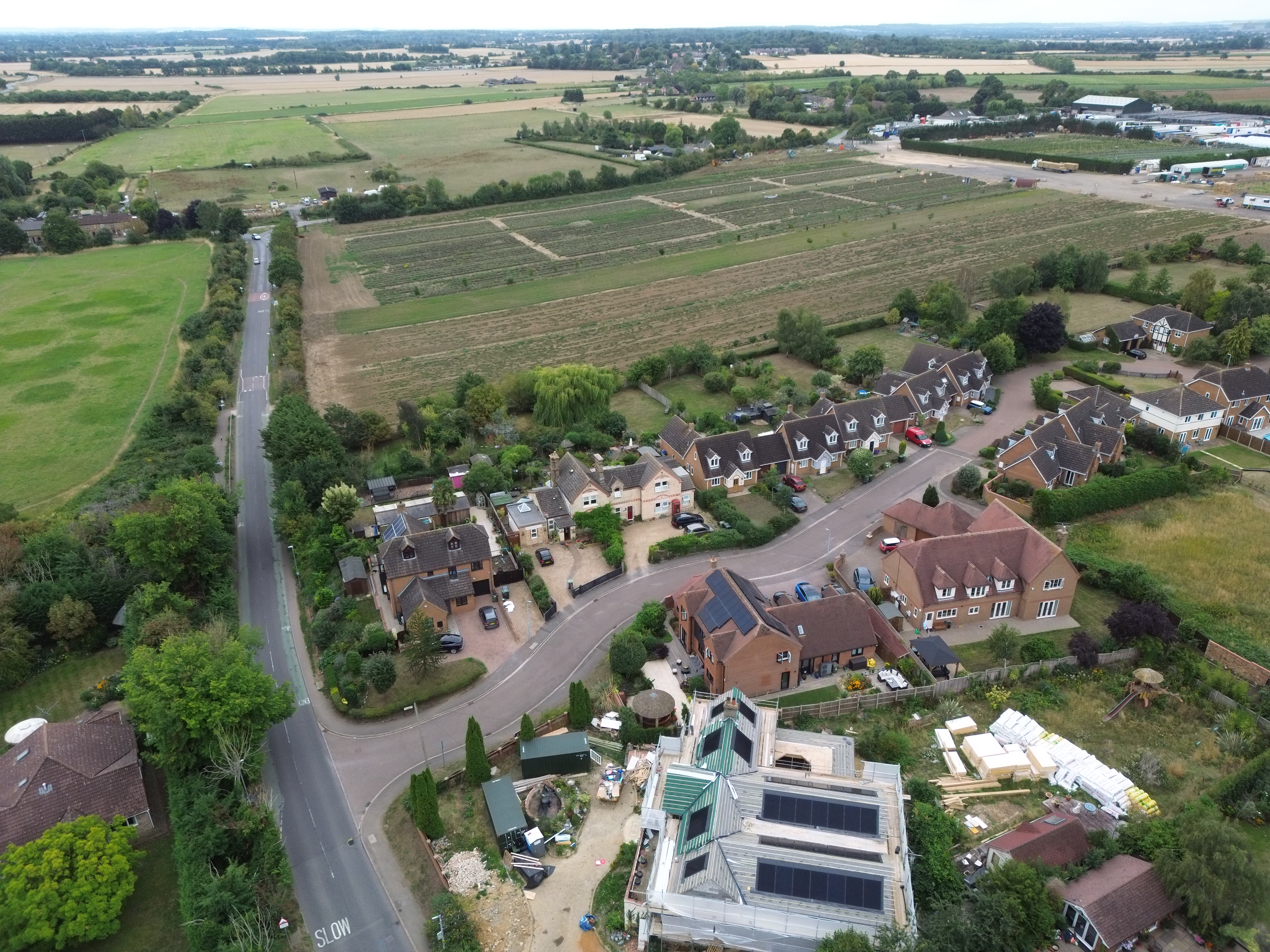
Current state of Blunham Railway Station (light coloured building). Taken from the air - August 2025

The station served a relatively rural community - there were 598 residents in 1901 - and this, coupled with its remote location to the south of Blunham village, left it susceptible to competition from the motor car. The station eventually closed together with the Bedford & Cambridge-built section of the Varsity Line in 1968.

Preceding station	Disused railways	Following station
Willington	British Railways; Varsity Line	Girtford Halt

== Present day ==
The main station building has been restored and converted into two semi-detached private residences respectively named "Stationmaster's Cottage" and "Station House". The approach road to the station has been redeveloped as a new housing development called "Old Station Court" which continues westwards across the former railway alignment. To the east, the trackbed is intact including bridge no. 15 over the River Ivel which now forms part of National Cycle Route 51.
