= Renhold Castle =

- Renhold, Bedfordshire, England

Site information
- Type: Ringwork
- Condition: Earthworks

Location
- Shown within Bedfordshire
- Coordinates: 52.1488°N 0.3837°W
- Grid reference: grid reference TL10695129

Renhold Castle also known as Howbury, earthwork at Water End Farm, was a medieval castle located in the village of Renhold, in the hundred of Barford, in the county of Bedfordshire, England.

Renhold Castle was a timber motte-and-bailey castle, encased by a moat. It was located 4 miles east of Bedford Castle and a mile south of Great Barford Castle. Only earthworks remain at the site, which is a Scheduled Monument protected by law.

== See also ==
- Castles in Great Britain and Ireland
- List of castles in England
