= Lord's Bridge railway station =

Former railway station in Cambridgeshire, England

Coordinates: 52.1706°N 0.0389°E

Lord's Bridge
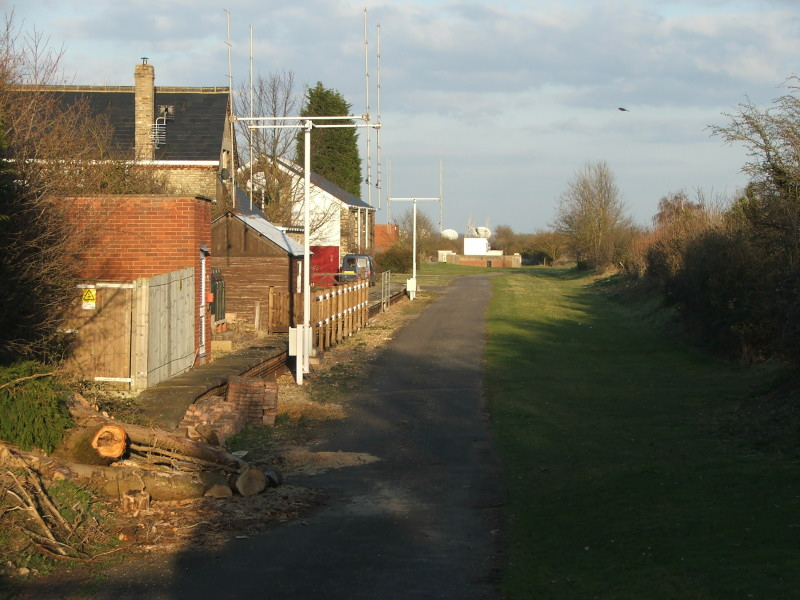
- Lord's Bridge station in March 2009

General information
- Location: Harlton, South Cambridgeshire; England
- Grid reference: TL395544
- Platforms: 2

Other information
- Status: Disused

History
- Original company: Bedford and Cambridge Railway
- Pre-grouping: London and North Western Railway
- Post-grouping: London, Midland and Scottish Railway; London Midland Region of British Railways (1948-1958); Eastern Region of British Railways (1958-1968)

Key dates
- 1 August 1862: Opened
- 13 July 1964: Closed to goods
- 1 January 1968: Closed to passengers
Location

Lord's Bridge was a railway station on the Varsity Line which ran between Oxford and Cambridge. Situated in the north of the parish of Harlton on the western outskirts of Cambridge, it was the penultimate station before the line's eastern terminus at Cambridge. The station opened in 1862 and closed more than a century later in 1968. The site is now part of the Mullard Radio Astronomy Observatory, which includes several rail-mounted radio-telescopes.

== History ==
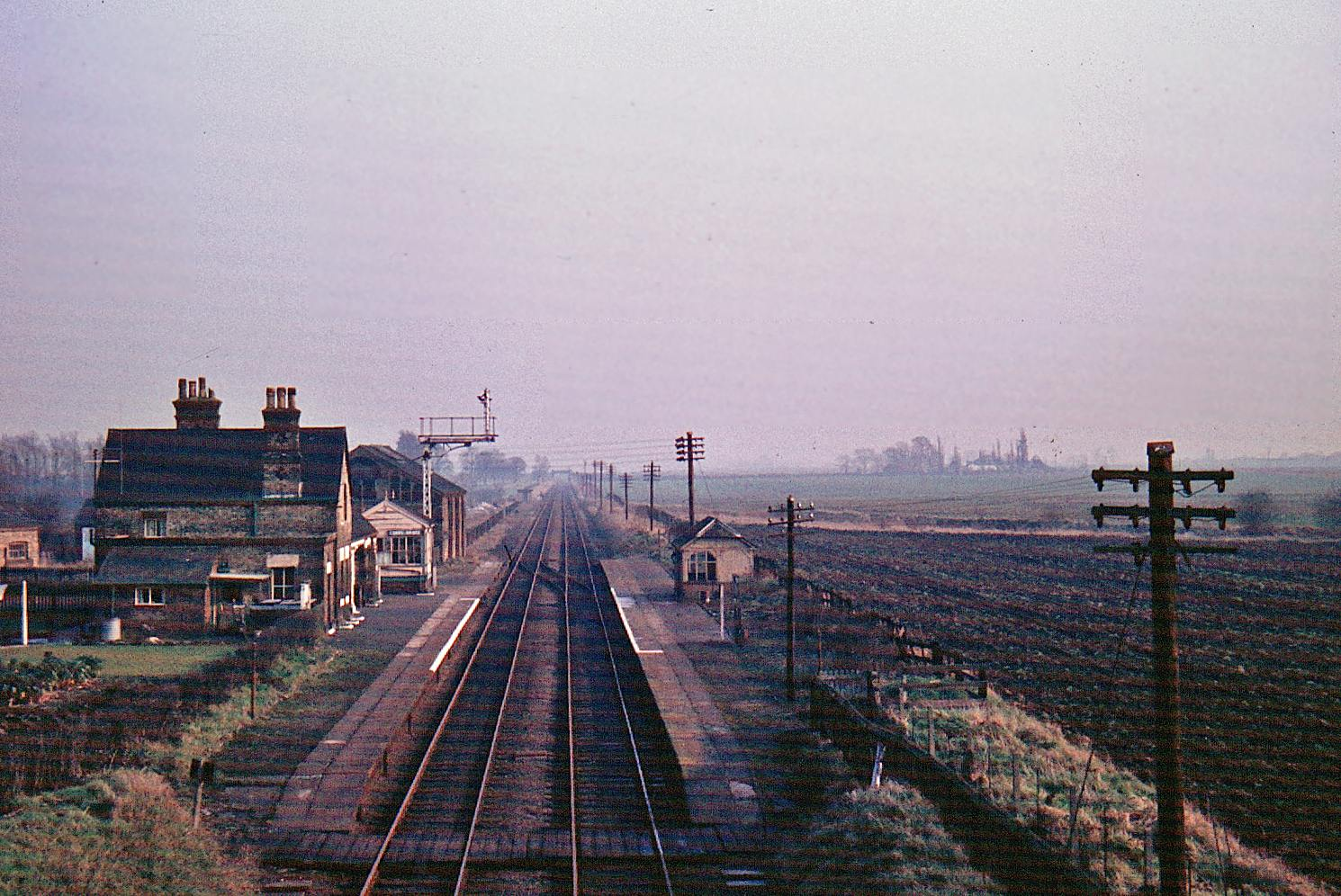
The station in December 1966

As with the neighbouring Old North Road station, Lord's Bridge was built in open country. It was principally a stop for the local Lord of the manor. The station's platforms were lengthened on 17 July 1907 to accommodate the longer trains running on the line.

The station was equipped with a LNWR type 4 signal box from which a key could be obtained to unlock the Toft & Kingston siding to the west which handled sugar beet and hay traffic. The traffic through Lord's Bridge was to change during the Second World War when a large ammunition store was built up at the station which brought many new workings to the line including an ex-Midland 2F tank locomotive which was kept permanently there for the purposes of shunting each train into the depot as they arrived and preparing the empties for return. The site included a Forward Filling Depot, FFD4, where bulk mustard gas from M. S. Factory, Valley was used to fill bombs and shells.

Preceding station	Disused railways	Following station
Old North Road	British Railways; Varsity Line	Cambridge

== Present day ==
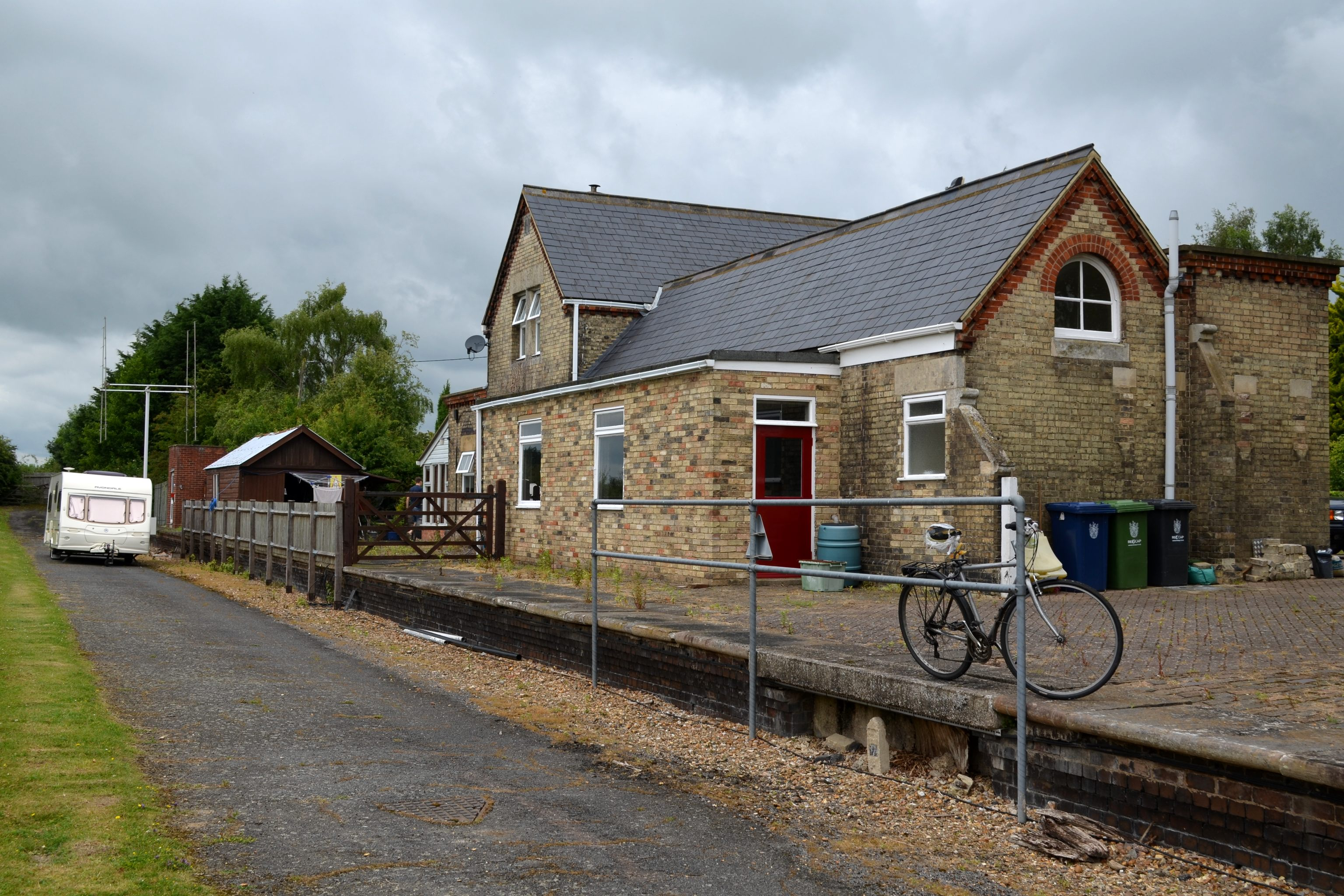
MRAO lecture hall and exhibition centre in the station house of Lord's Bridge railway station in June 2014

Following closure of the line between Bedford and Cambridge on New Year's Eve 1967, a section from Lord's Bridge station towards Cambridge became part of the University of Cambridge's Mullard Radio Astronomy Observatory, which had opened in 1957 on a site to the south of the station. This allowed the construction of the rail-mounted Ryle radio telescope array, moving along a 4.8 km length of track of approximately 20 ft gauge.

The goods shed remains as does a single length of the eastbound platform.

== See also ==
- Beeching Axe
