= Blunham =

Village in Bedfordshire, England

Coordinates: 52.147°N 0.322°W

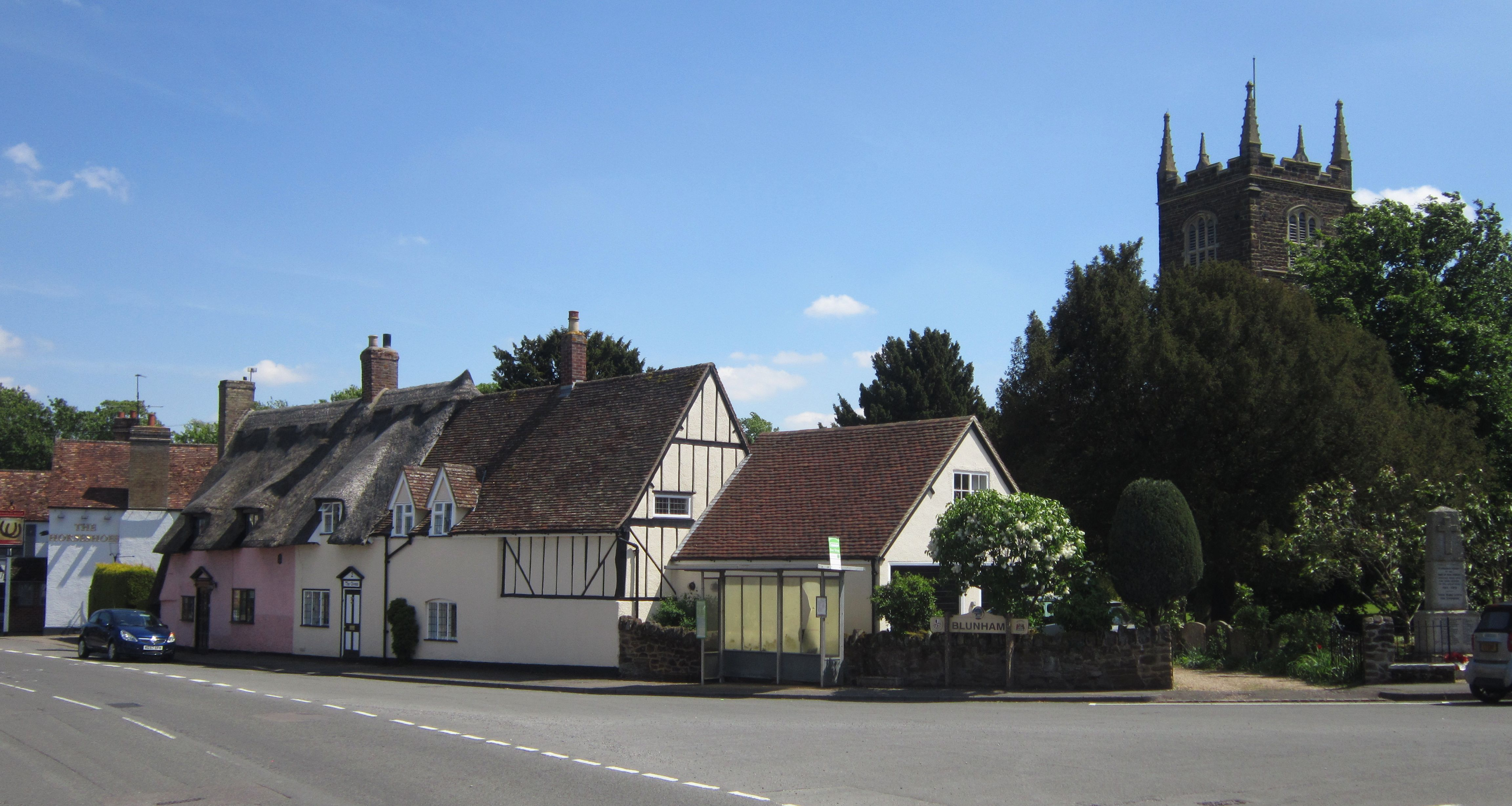
- Blunham village centre

- Location within Bedfordshire
- Population: 926 (2001 census); 946 (2011 Census)
- OS grid reference: TL14805123
- Unitary authority: Central Bedfordshire
- Ceremonial county: Bedfordshire
- Region: East
- Country: England
- Sovereign state: United Kingdom
- Post town: BEDFORD
- Postcode district: MK44
- Dialling code: 01767
- Police: Bedfordshire
- Fire: Bedfordshire
- Ambulance: East of England
- UK Parliament: North Bedfordshire

Blunham is a village and civil parish in the Central Bedfordshire district of Bedfordshire, England, about 6 miles (10 km) east of Bedford town centre. At the 2011 census date its population was 946. The River Ivel forms the parish's eastern boundary in places and the River Great Ouse its western and northern boundaries. The village is just over 0.6 miles (1 km) to the west of the A1 road, and Route 51 of the National Cycle Network passes to the south.

At the north of village is an unusual double humpback bridge across the River Ivel and the Mill Stream which must be crossed to enter the village from the A1 road or Tempsford.

The village school is notable for its thatched roof.

== Geography ==
Blunham is 1.7 miles (3 km) north-west of Sandy, 19 miles (31 km) west of Cambridge and 45 miles (72 km) north of Central London.

Area

The civil parish covers an area of 486 hectares (1,201 acres).

Landscape

The village lies within the Bedfordshire and Cambridgeshire Claylands (NCA 88) as designated by Natural England. Central Bedfordshire Council has classified the local landscape as the Great Ouse Clay Clay Valley (type 4A); a shallow, fairly wide valley of the Rivers Great Ouse and Ivel. The surrounding area is arable farmland but with pastures alongside the Great Ouse near Great Barford and the Ivel. The course of the rivers is marked by riverside vegetation including mature willows. Hedgerows are often gappy or lost but some hedgerow trees are present along with poplar shelter belts. There are glasshouses around Blunham Grange. On the eastern bank of the Ivel just over the parish boundary are two lakes formed from disused sand and gravel pits. Unusually for an agricultural area the parish is devoid of farms. Previous market gardening resulted in many small parcels of land. Some of these have been amalgamated into larger holdings largely worked by farmers from other parishes.

Elevation

Blunham is between 20 metres (66 ft) and 36 metres (118 ft) above sea level, with the whole parish relatively flat.

Geology and soil type

The village lies on first, second and third terrace river gravel or boulder clay. Alluvium borders the Great Ouse and Ivel rivers. The soil has low fertility, is freely draining and slightly acid with a loamy texture.

The night sky and light pollution

Light pollution is the level of radiance (night lights) shining up into the night sky. The Campaign to Protect Rural England (CPRE) divides the level of night sky brightness into 9 bands with band 1 being the darkest i.e. with the lowest level of light pollution and band 9 the brightest and most polluted. Blunham is in band 5. The night sky brightens towards the A1 road and Sandy.

Public footpaths

Central Bedfordshire public footpath no. 4 runs from north High Street across fields to the Ouse at Great Barford. A stretch of the Kingfisher Way walk runs along the eastern bank of the Ivel.

River Ivel

The Environment Agency has a monitoring station at Blunham. The normal level of the River Ivel at Blunham is between 0.18 metres (7 in) and 0.38 metres (1 ft). The highest level recorded was 1.45 metres (5 ft) on Friday 3 January 2003.

== History ==
Population growth in Blunham since 1801
Year	Pop.	±%
1801	376	—
1841	625	+66.2%
1881	620	−0.8%
1921	603	−2.7%
1961	612	+1.5%
2001	925	+51.1%

The name Blunham probably means Bluna's home. Bluna being an Old English personal name.

Water mill

A mill at Blunham is mentioned in the Domesday Book of 1086. There has been a mill on the island between the Ivel and its millstream near the Blunham twin bridges for many years. It fell into disuse between 1898 and 1910 and was converted into a private dwelling.

The twin bridges

Blunham river bridge carries the road to Tempsford over the River Ivel. Though of typical medieval style it is probably of 17th-century origin. It was adopted as a county bridge in 1839. There are five rounded sandstone arches and a later parapet of red bricks. The coping in vitrified brick and stone is dated 1866. The parapet was increased in height in 1893 and the coping reused. The original parapet can be seen from the river on the northern face. The upstream (southern) piers have triangular cutwaters. Probably higher originally, they would have formed pedestrian refuges. The refuges were in-filled and the cutwaters capped with half-pyramid shaped stones when the parapet was raised. A well-preserved paved stone invert was found under the easternmost arch during repair works in 1992.

The single span plate girder Ivel Navigation bridge of five curved cast iron beams resting on abutments of large sandstone blocks was built in 1823. A pair of ties at right angles to the carriageway hold the beams together. The deck is formed by iron plates resting on top of the girders. Moreton and Kinman of the Vulcan Foundry, Biggleswade was the manufacturer and their name plate is bolted to the west abutment below the south girder. The iron railings date from 1992 and are replicas of the originals.

Public houses and beer houses

The Bedfordshire Archives and Records Service lists nine public houses and beer houses in Blunham with the oldest being The Ragged Staff with records dating from 1646. The name was changed to The Salutation in 1768 and continued as such until closure in December 2011. Extensive renovations by the current owner are ongoing for conversion to a private residence. The carpark land was sold separately and a detached house built in 2014.

The Railway Inn/Tavern was built in 1862. It closed in 1966 prior to the railway's demise but reopened in 1979. Renamed The Huntress in 1992, it remained as a public house until 2000 before being converted into a domestic dwelling.

Post office

The first mention of a post office in the village is in 1839, when the village had a Penny Post service under St Neots. The post office national archives record the issue to Blunham in August 1886 of a type of postmark known as a rubber datestamp. The village post office closed in October 2008. It was one of about 2,500 compulsory compensated closures of UK post office branches announced by the Government in 2007.

Railway station

The station on the Oxford to Cambridge railway line was in use from 1862 until 1968, when the line closed. The converted station buildings on Old Station Road remain readily distinguishable from the surrounding modern housing by their yellow brick with red brick patterns. The old railway is now part of Route 51 of the National Cycle Network. The route heads east towards Sandy and west towards Willington and Bedford.

== Governance ==
Blunham parish council is made up of 10 elected councillors who serve a four-year term. The council is responsible for roadside seats, bus shelters, the play equipment on the playing field, the cemetery, the church yard and some of the street lighting. It is part of Sandy ward for elections to the Central Bedfordshire Unitary Authority.

Prior to 1894, Blunham was administered as part of the hundred of Wixamtree. From 1894 until 1974 it was in Biggleswade Rural District and from 1974 to 2009 in Mid Bedfordshire District.

Blunham was in the Mid Bedfordshire parliamentary constituency until 1997 and North East Bedfordshire until 2024. Now in North Bedfordshire, its elected member is Richard Fuller of the Conservative Party.

== Economy ==
Two coach companies are based on Barford Road. Herbert's Travel operate a fleet of school coaches and buses. Chiltern Travel run coach tours and holidays.

P G Technical Services, The Hill, has been providing CNC milling and turning as well as conventional manual machining including surface grinding since 1986.

A variety of chillis are grown under glasshouses at Villa Nurseries off Grange Road by Genovese Ltd.

Just outside the parish at South Mills is packaging company DS Smith's corrugated sheetfeeding facility.

== School ==
John Donne Church of England School is Voluntary Aided and caters for infants aged from 3 to 5 years in its nursery and children up to age 11 in the main school. The school is named after John Donne, (1572 – 1631), poet, Dean of St. Paul's, Member of Parliament and a former Rector of Blunham parish.

The original school built in 1813 retains its thatched roof and has two classrooms. An additional schoolroom was built in 1852. A fire in 1971 destroyed two rooms added in 1874 and another from 1902. New classrooms were built on the same site in 1973. A kitchen, cloakroom and office extension was added in 1974 and a new library in July 2005. The Bishop of Bedford opened the purpose built Nursery Unit in September 2011.

There is capacity for a total of 168 children in the main school although the 2018−19 roll call was less than half this. The nursery has a maximum of 40 full-time equivalent places.

== Churches ==
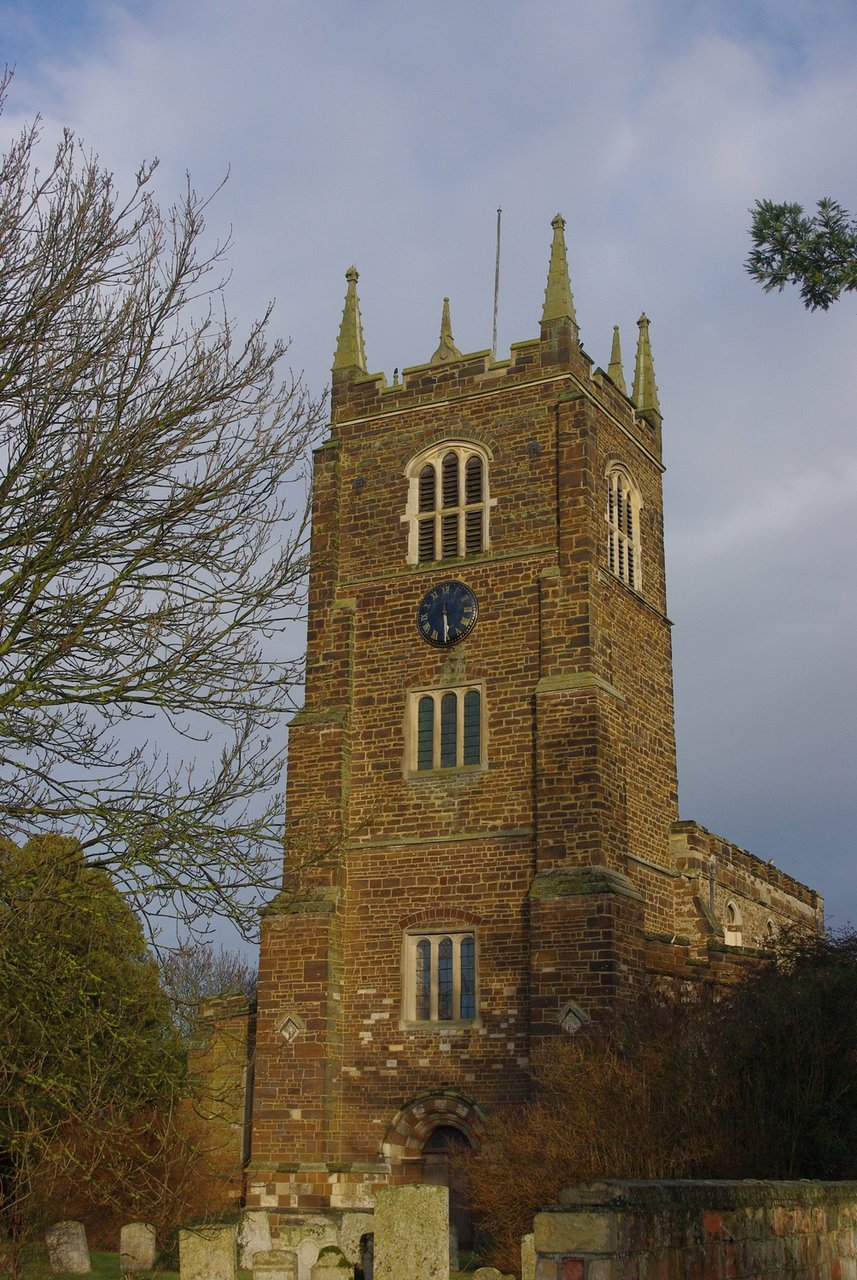
The church tower

Parish church

The Grade I listed parish church is today known as the Church of St Edmund or St James. However, the Victoria County History series published in 1912 refers to St Edmund only. The church has a massive but delicate tower built of sandstone and limestone. The lower section dates from circa 1100 and is the earliest part of the church. In the 16th century the tower was restored and partly rebuilt. It rises in three stages and is topped by crocketed pinnacles at each corner. There is a ring of six bells, the earliest dedicated in 1580 and the latest in 1953.

Providence Baptist Chapel

The chapel in Park lane was built in 1842. The original vestry was demolished in the early 1980s and a new extension built. Church members are 'Strict and Particular' Baptists.

Family Life Church - Blunham Old Chapel

The building, next to the school on the High Street, dates from 1751, and was fully refurbished in 2016 to look and feel contemporary yet keeping some of its original features. The church has a band, active Kids club and hosts many events such as a bonfire night, Christmas Party, Children's club, Holiday Club, Toddlers group.

== Community and facilities ==
The village hall is home to Blunham Community Cinema which commenced in February 2016 with National Lottery funding. Films are screened on the last Friday evening of each month.

The Horseshoes owned by Charles Wells is the only public house in the village and is first mentioned in historical records as far back as 1769.

Blunham Supermarket and Blunham Fish Bar are both on the High Street. The former telephone exchange building in Station Road houses a ladies hair salon.

== Sport and recreation ==
A playing field with children's play area and sports pavilion is maintained by the Blunham Playing Fields Association charity.

Blunham Football Club competes in the Bedfordshire County Football League Third Division. The team have finished champions of the Premier Division on three occasions: in 1997–8, 2009–10 and 2010–11. The Britannia Cup was won in 1997-8 and 2000–1, the Aubrey Tingey Memorial Cup in 1986-7 and the Jubilee Cup in 1983–4.

From 10:00 am Thursday 26 August to 7:00 pm Monday 30 August 2010, two teams of Cricket players from the Blunham Cricket Club (BCC) played in all weather to set a new record for a continuous game of Cricket. 105 hours were played continuously, playing through a month's rainfall in just 4 days, going through four consecutive nights.

== Notable residents ==
- John Donne, poet and preacher, was rector of the church from 1621 until his death in 1631.
- Andy Holden (artist) (born 1982) lived in Blunham as a child, and studied at Goldsmiths, University of London and has exhibited at Tate Britain.
- George Joye was given the Rectory of Blunham In September 1549 by Sir Henry Grey of Flitton.
- Herbert Murrill, composer, and his wife the cellist Vera Canning lived at Blunham Rectory from the early 1940s.
- Frederick Rawlins (1907–1968), cricketer
