= Tempsford railway station =

Former railway station in Bedfordshire, England

Coordinates: 52.1737°N 0.2752°W

Tempsford

General information
- Location: Tempsford, Central Bedfordshire; England
- Grid reference: TL180542
- Platforms: 4

Other information
- Status: Disused

History
- Original company: Great Northern Railway
- Pre-grouping: Great Northern Railway
- Post-grouping: London and North Eastern Railway

Key dates
- 1 January 1863: Opened
- 5 November 1956: Closed for passengers
- 1 March 1965: Closed for freight
Location

Tempsford railway station was a railway station built by the Great Northern Railway to serve the village of Tempsford in Bedfordshire, England. A new station is actively being planned for the crossing point of the East Coast Main Line (which replaced the Great Northern) with the planned East West Rail (the Oxford–Cambridge line).

== History ==
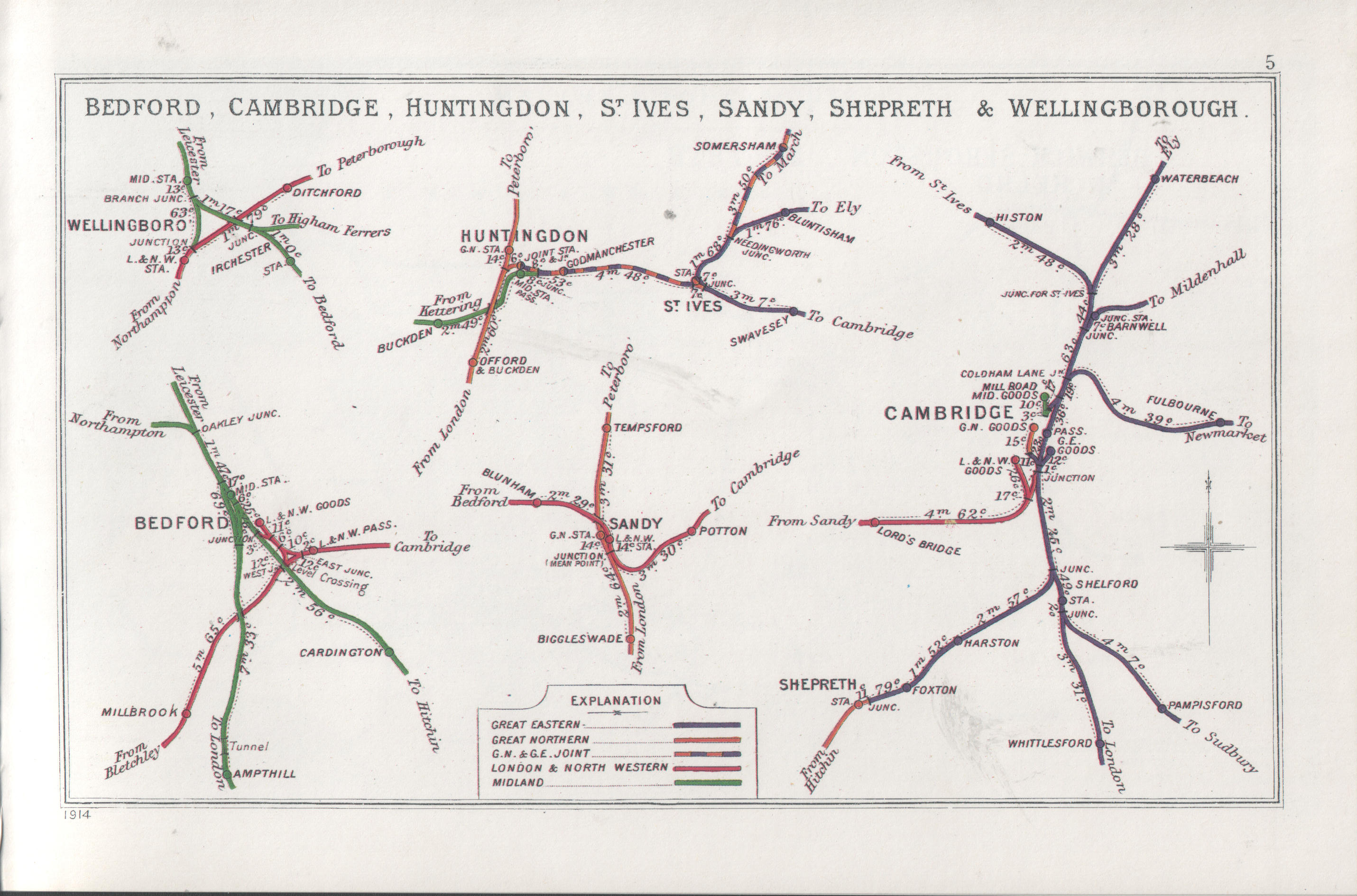
A 1914 Railway Clearing House map showing (lower centre) railways in the vicinity of Tempsford

The Great Northern Railway main line from London to Peterborough had opened in 1850 including stations at Sandy and St. Neots. A station between these, named Tempsford, was opened on 1 January 1863. It was located 47 miles 40 chains (76.4 km) from London King's Cross.

The station closed on 5 November 1956.

== Planned reopening ==
In January 2019, the East West Railway Company (EWRC) announced a number of options for a new route for the Bedford–Cambridge sector of their planned Oxford–Cambridge railway line. In January 2020, the company announced that it had selected a route that would cross the ECML "in the Tempsford area", bypassing both Sandy railway station and St Neots railway station. The company did not formally decide at that point if East West Rail would use the old location or a new site, However, in March 2021, the East West Railway Company opened an 'informal consultation' on proposals for the central section's route alignment and thus the location of this station. Two sites were considered, one just north of the original station and the other, "St Neots South", a mile or so north of it: at that stage, the latter was its preference.

In May 2023, EWRC announced Tempsford as the preferred location for the new interchange station and dismissed the "St Neots South" option. The indicative location for the station is about 1 km (0.6 mi) north of the original station. Funding for the station was confirmed in a speech by Chancellor Rachel Reeves in January 2025, who said that the station would also serve the East Coast Main Line.

In its April 2026 consultation document, EWRC proposed that work will begin on the new station by 2030, initially serving the East Coast Main Line, with the East West Rail connection to follow within a few years.

== Route ==
Preceding station	Historical railways	Following station
Sandy; Line and station open	Great Northern Railway; East Coast Main Line	St Neots; Line and station open
