= Sandy railway station =

Railway station in Bedfordshire, England

Coordinates: 52.125°N 0.281°W

Sandy
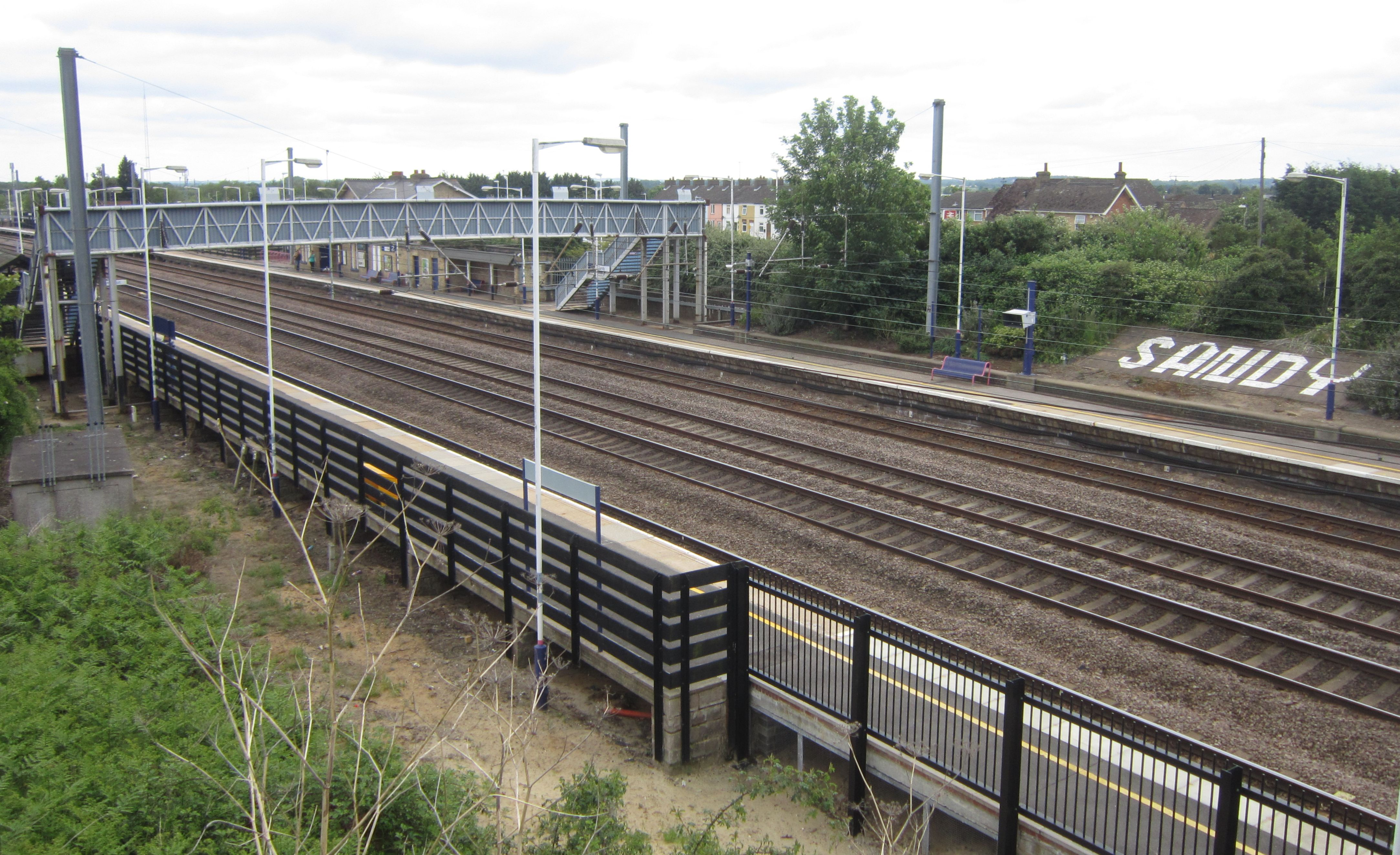

General information
- Location: Sandy, Central Bedfordshire; England
- Grid reference: TL177487
- Managed by: Great Northern
- Platforms: 2
- Tracks: 4

Other information
- Station code: SDY
- Classification: DfT category E

History
- Opened: 7 August 1850
- Original company: Great Northern Railway
- Pre-grouping: Great Northern Railway
- Post-grouping: London and North Eastern Railway; Eastern Region of British Railways

Passengers
- 2020–21: ▼0.143 million
- 2021–22: ▲0.386 million
- 2022–23: ▲0.524 million
- 2023–24: ▲0.572 million
- 2024–25: ▲0.679 million
Location
- Interactive map of station area
Notes
- Passenger statistics from the Office of Rail and Road

Sandy railway station serves the town of Sandy in Bedfordshire, England. It is on the East Coast Main Line, about 44 miles (71 km) from London King's Cross. Sandy is managed by Great Northern but all train services are operated by Thameslink.

Sandy station was originally built in 1850 for the Great Northern Railway; the London and North Western Railway opened an adjacent station in 1862. The stations were later merged into one, which has since undergone many changes.

The present station has two large platforms and 4 main rail lines, a pair of "up and down" slow lines used by stopping services and a pair of "up and down" fast lines used by high speed services passing through. A fifth line extends off the "up" slow line which links into the remaining sidings and original bay platforms. There is also a sixth line off the "down" slow line that links to a siding beside Platform 1.

== History ==
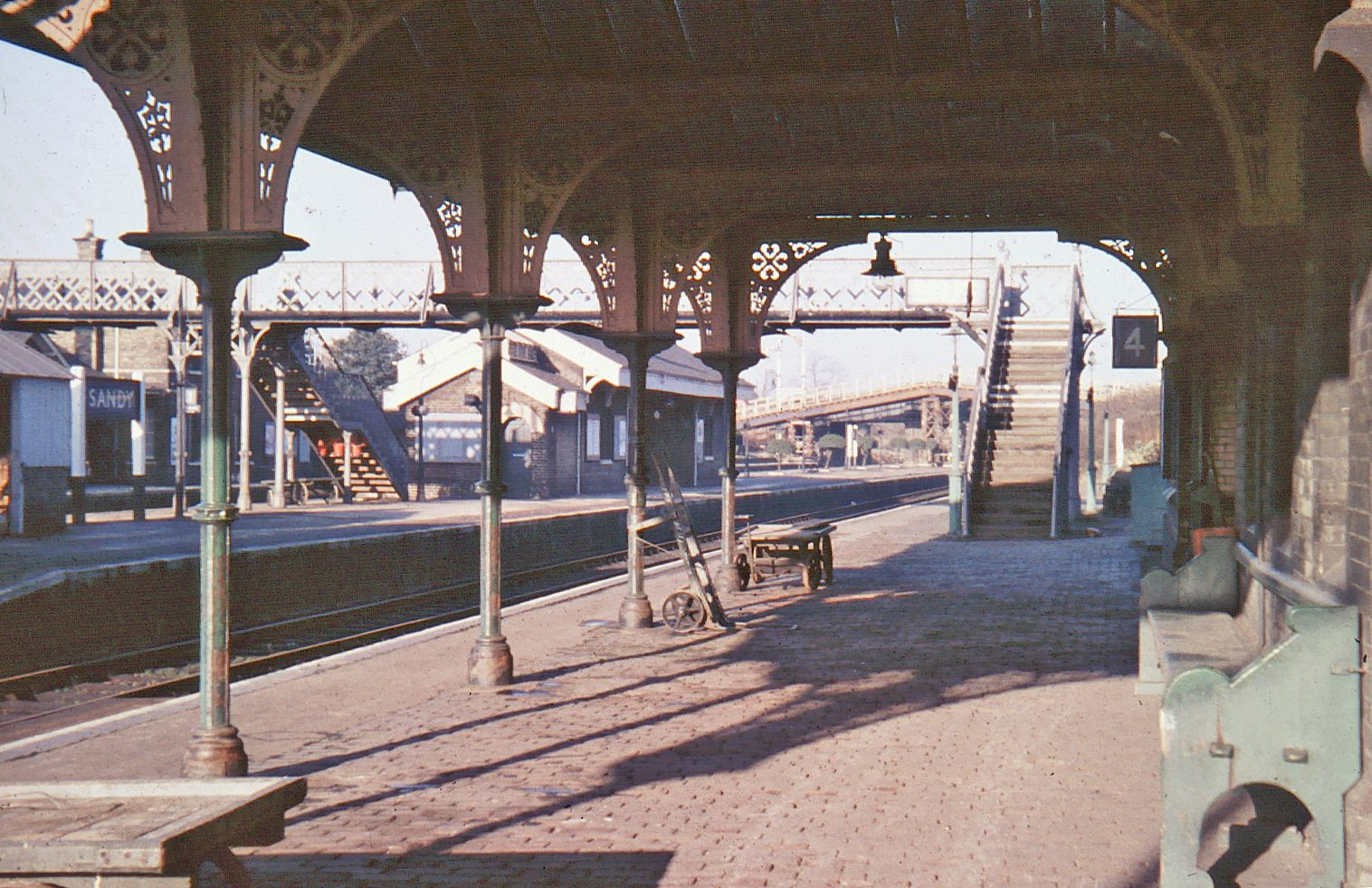
December 1966

The first section of the Great Northern Railway (GNR) - that from Louth to a junction with the Manchester, Sheffield and Lincolnshire Railway at Grimsby - opened on 1 March 1848, but the southern section of the main line, between Maiden Lane and Peterborough, was not opened until August 1850. Sandy was one of the original stations, opening with the line on 7 August 1850.

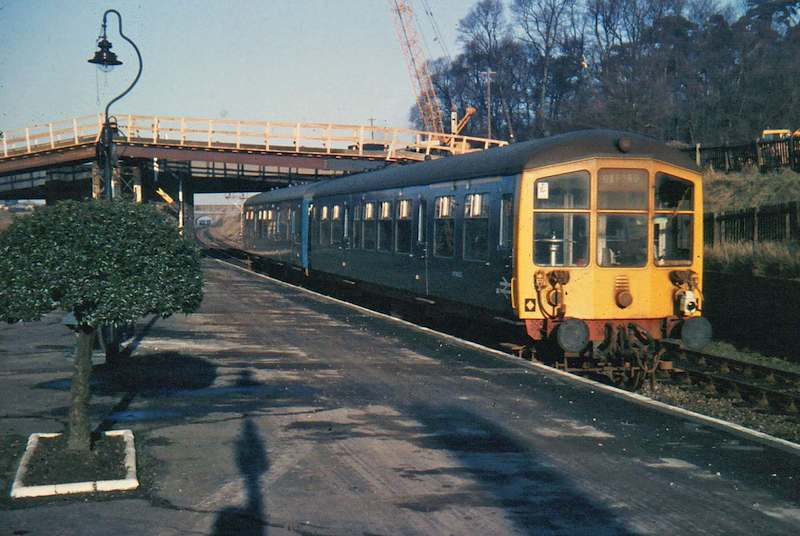
December 1967

The Sandy and Potton Railway was opened for goods traffic on 23 June 1857, and to passengers on 9 November 1857. It was later purchased by the Bedford and Cambridge Railway (B&CR), which closed the line in January 1862 for reconstruction. The line reopened on 7 July 1862, including a new station at Sandy separate from, but adjacent to, the GNR station. The B&CR was absorbed by the London and North Western Railway (LNWR) in 1865. The eastern section of the Bedford-Cambridge route (sometimes known as the Varsity Line) closed on 1 January 1968, and with it, the ex-LNWR platforms at Sandy.

The two stations were physically adjacent, and shared an island platform. In 1917 the LNWR station was placed under the management of the GNR, and then shared the booking facilities. After the closure of the Varsity Line, the station was considerably rebuilt in the early 1970s to give a 4-track layout throughout, and platforms on the slow lines only, thus removing a 2-track bottleneck on the East Coast Main Line.

Sandy railway station was the site of the English unjust enrichment case Great Northern Railway Co. v Swaffield (1874) LR 9 Exch 132, in which the defendant sent a horse to this railway station, to be collected. His employee arrived the next day, but the station master demanded that he pay livery stable costs for the night; the employee refused to pay, and did not collect the horse. The defendant arrived later, and demanded payment to compensate him for duress of goods (after the station master offered to pay livery stable costs out of pocket); after the station master refused to pay such compensation, the defendant left the horse in the possession of the station for four months during litigation. The Court of the Exchequer held the defendant liable for four months' stable costs, as the plaintiff (the railway company) in the case 'had not choice, unless they would leave the horse at the station or in the high road to his own danger and the danger of other people' (per Kelly CB). In this way the court recognised a limited exception to the rule that no claim for salvage be recognised by the courts outside the context of salvage in tidal waters. The stable costs were paid to the use of the defendant by way of necessity, and therefore constituted unjust enrichment.

== Facilities ==
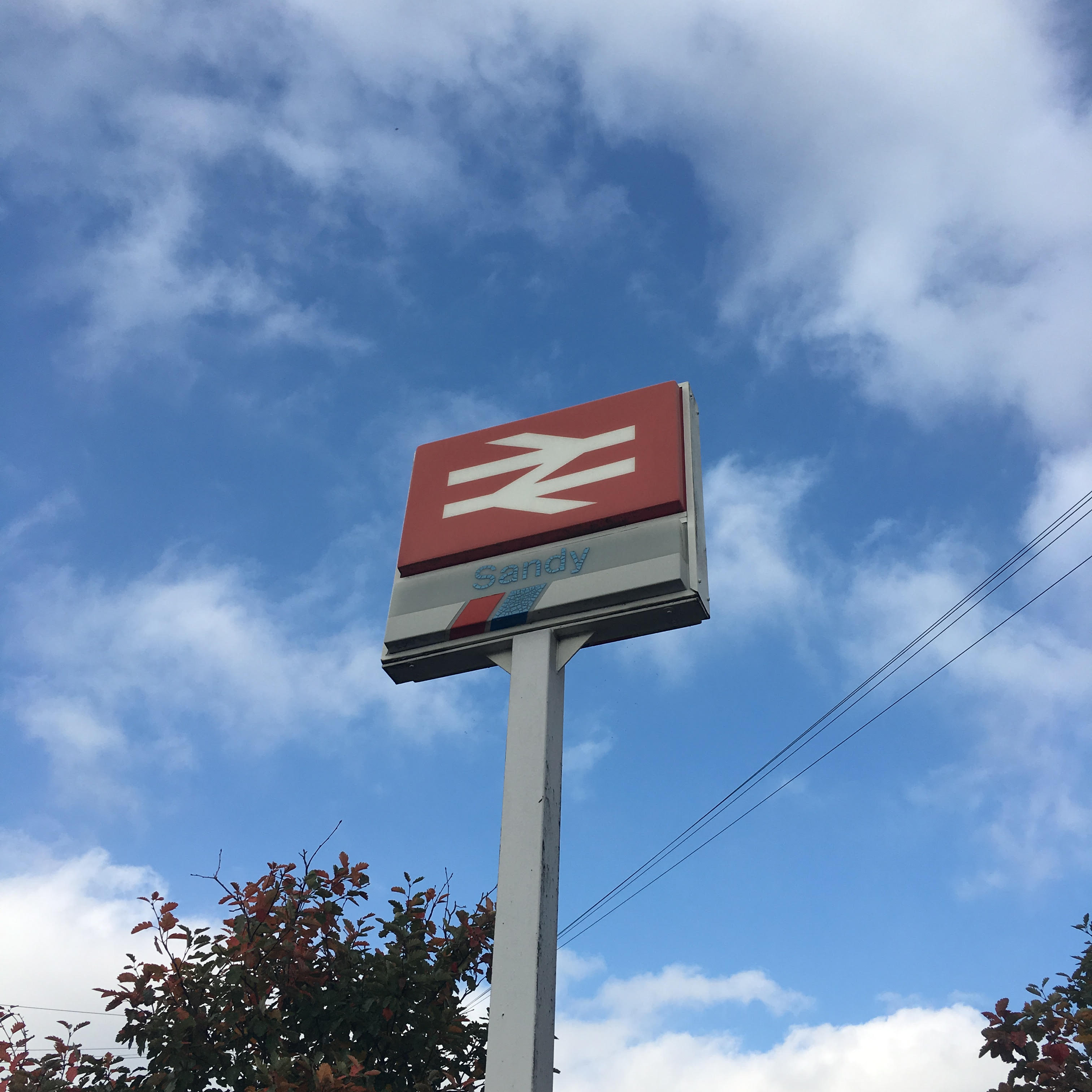
National Rail signpost at the station

Sandy station has a small café inside the booking office on Platform 2. There is a large sheltered area with seating on Platform 1, and a smaller one on Platform 2. Both platforms have step-free access via the external road bridge. However the slope to the bridge is relatively steep on both sides of the railway and the footpath on the bridge is quite narrow.

In the later half of 2016, modern ticket barriers were installed at the entrance to both platforms along with a covered area to protect them from wind and rain damage. When in use, there are staff on hand if any issues arise.

The station has two modern touch screen ticket machines located in front of the booking office, and there are cycle storage facilities to the south of it. The station also has help points throughout, which were installed by former franchise holder First Capital Connect.

== Services ==
All services at Sandy are operated by Thameslink using Class 700 EMUs.

The typical off-peak service in trains per hour is:

- 2 tph to Horsham via London Bridge, Redhill and Gatwick Airport
- 2 tph to Peterborough (all stations)

On Sundays, the service is reduced to hourly and southbound services run to London King's Cross instead of Horsham.

Preceding station	National Rail	Following station
Biggleswade	Thameslink Great Northern Route	St Neots
	Historical railways	
Biggleswade Line and station open	Great Northern Railway East Coast Main Line	Tempsford Line open, station closed
	Disused railways	
Girtford Halt Line and station closed	British Rail Eastern Region Varsity Line	Potton Line and station closed

== Future ==
In 2017, there was speculation that the station might be relocated from its current position in the town centre to a new site just to the north of the town. In late January 2020, East West Rail Ltd announced that the route of EWR between Bedford and Cambridge would be 'in the Tempsford area', mid way between Sandy and St Neots. Concern has been expressed locally that a new EWR/ECML interchange hub at Tempsford railway station may lead to the closure of Sandy station.

== Location ==
Sandy station (in Bedfordshire)

In the chainage notation traditionally used on the railways, it is 44 miles 10 chains (71.01 km; 44.13 mi) from London King's Cross.
