= Battle of Tempsford =

Coordinates: 52.1706°N 0.2962°W

- Part of the Viking invasions of England
Date	917
Location	Tempsford, England
Result	Anglo-Saxon victory

Belligerents
Anglo-Saxons	Vikings

Commanders and leaders
King Edward I	King Guthrum II †; Jarl Toglos; Jarl Manna †

Strength
Unknown	Unknown

Casualties and losses
Unknown	Unknown

In 917, the group of Danes who had previously been based in Huntingdon relocated to Tempsford in Bedfordshire, together with other Danes from East Anglia. They built and fortified a new burh there, to serve as a forward base for attacks on English territory. Later that year, after launching an unsuccessful attack on Bedford, they were attacked by an English army from the territories of King Edward the Elder, as part of his widespread offensive which in that year overwhelmed the Danish territories in East Anglia and south-eastern Mercia. The burh was stormed and a Danish king, probably that of East Anglia, was killed, along with the Jarls Toglos and Manna and many of their followers, while the rest were captured.
