= Girtford Halt railway station =

Former railway station in Bedfordshire, England

Coordinates: 52.1392°N 0.2998°W

Girtford Halt

General information
- Location: Sandy, Central Bedfordshire; England
- Grid reference: TL164503
- Platforms: 1

Other information
- Status: Disused

History
- Original company: London, Midland and Scottish Railway

Key dates
- 1 January 1938: Opened as Girtford
- July 1938: Renamed Girtford Halt
- 17 November 1940: Closed to passengers
- 1 November 1951: Closed to goods
Location

Girtford Halt was a short-lived railway halt on the Varsity Line which served the Girtford area of Sandy in Bedfordshire, England. It was opened by the London, Midland and Scottish Railway in 1938, but closed to passenger traffic two years later in 1940. The line itself closed in 1968, and the site of the railway station has been obliterated by a roundabout.

== History ==
In January 1938, the LMSR opened Girtford Halt at the point where the A1 crossed the Varsity Line, a little to the north of the hamlet from which it took its name. A siding for vegetable traffic had existed on the station site since 1863 and this remained open. Passenger facilities consisted of little more than a raised concrete platform; access was via a field to the rear of the station; tickets had to be purchased from a nearby garage. The station was, however, little used and passenger services were withdrawn in November 1940, the station remaining open for freight until 1951.

Preceding station	Disused railways	Following station
Blunham	British Railways; Varsity Line	Sandy

== Present day ==
No trace of the station remains and its site has been taken over by a roundabout on Georgetown Road, a new road skirting the London Road Industrial Estate.
