= Gamlingay railway station =

Former railway station in Cambridgeshire, England

Coordinates: 52.1507°N 0.1784°W

Gamlingay
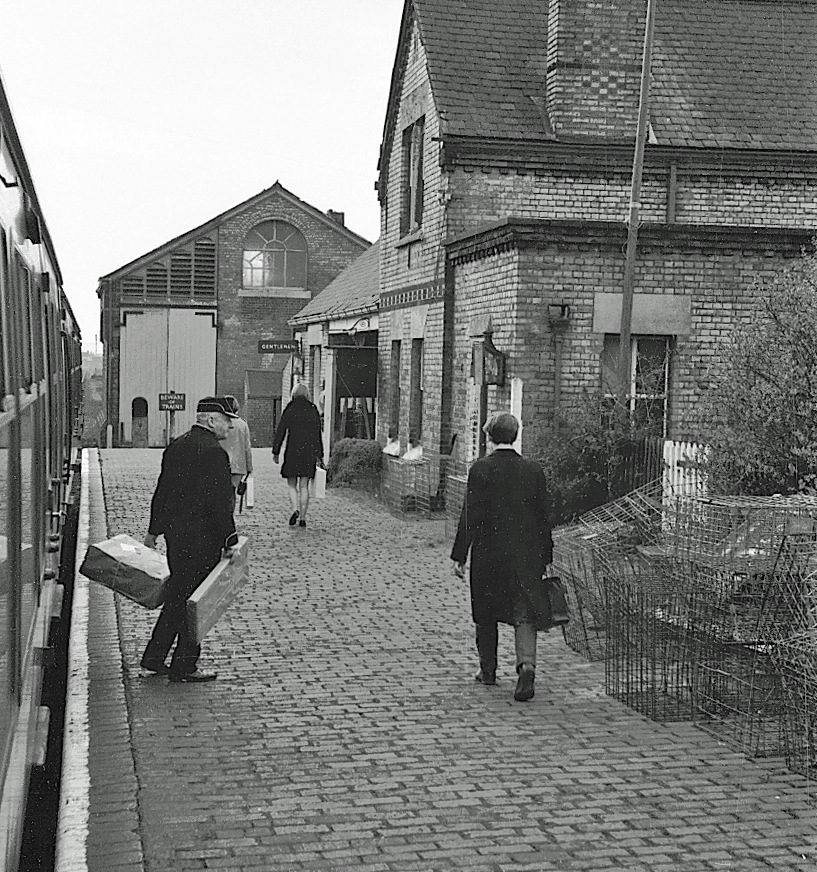
- The station in 1967

General information
- Location: Gamlingay, South Cambridgeshire; England
- Grid reference: TL247518
- Platforms: 2

Other information
- Status: Disused

History
- Original company: Bedford and Cambridge Railway
- Pre-grouping: London and North Western Railway
- Post-grouping: London, Midland and Scottish Railway; London Midland Region of British Railways (1948–1958); Eastern Region of British Railways (1958–1968)

Key dates
- 1 August 1862: Opened
- 19 April 1965: Closed to goods
- 1 January 1968: Closed to passengers
Location

Gamlingay railway station was a railway station on the Varsity Line which served the village of Gamlingay in Cambridgeshire, England. The station opened in 1862 and was located in a rural area that saw little passenger traffic; it closed together with the line in 1968.

== History ==
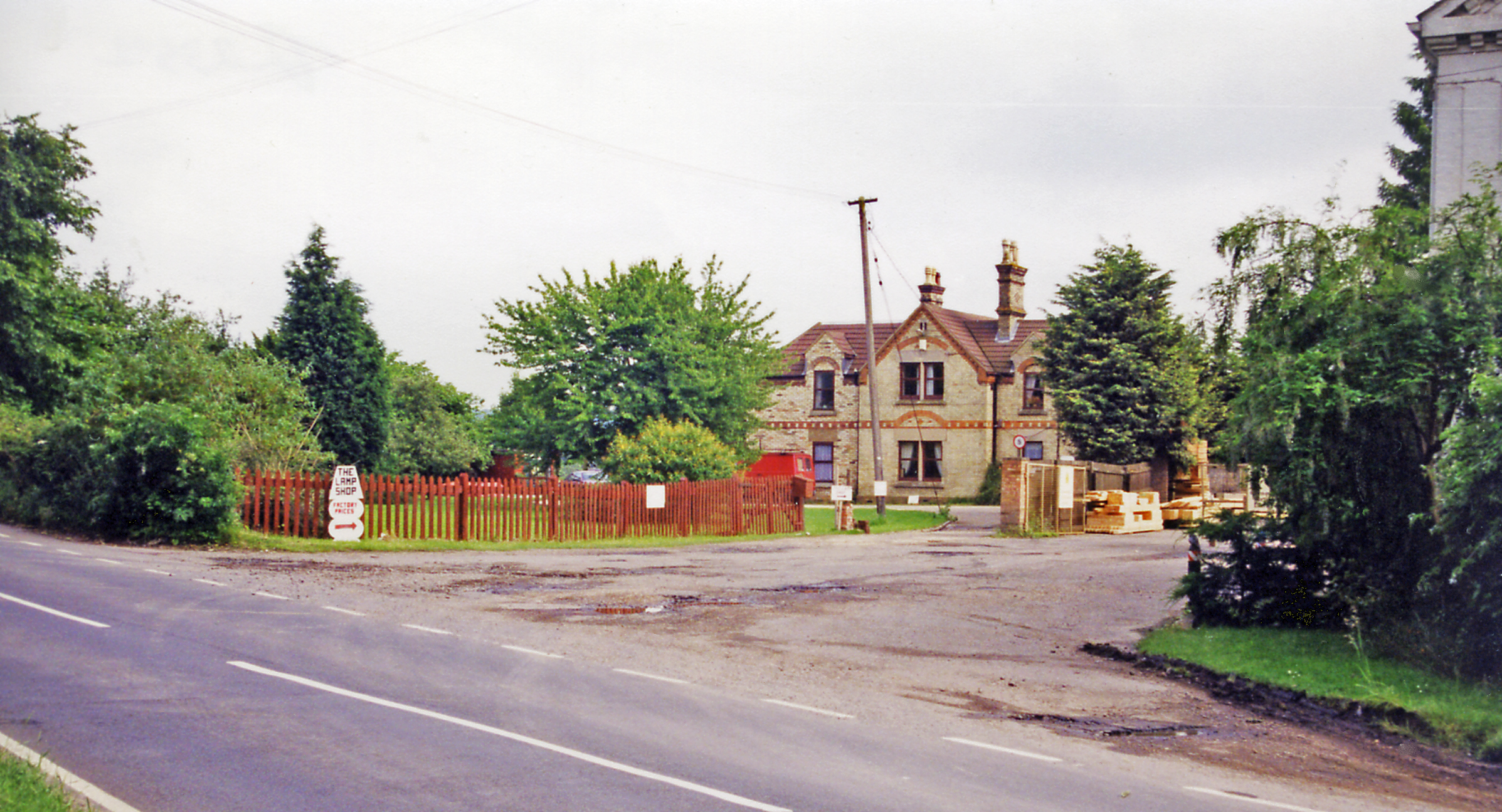
The station buildings in 1998

The first station after Potton, Gamlingay marked the start of the distinctly rural section of the Varsity Line, where industrial landscapes gave way to the rolling fields, tall trees and wide-open skies of Cambridgeshire. The station, slightly to the south-east of Gamlingay village, was situated just before a two-mile climb of 1 in 150 to Hayley Wood. The station had two platforms lit by old lamps right up until its closure, the substantial station buildings being situated on the Down platform, whilst a timber and slate waiting shelter was to be found on the Up side. A goods yard was located to the west of the station buildings, consisting of three sidings plus a cattle pen and a goods shed. The station layout changed little during its lifetime, yet the community which it served decreased from 1,722 inhabitants in 1901 to 1,622 in 1961.

Four years after the station's opening in 1862, a brick siding was opened just before the milepost 30 to the west of Gamlingay which was known as "Dennis's Brick Siding" and trailed from the Up line across the Down through a gate to a brickworks. By January 1909, the siding was known as "Belle Vue Brickworks Siding" and remained in service until 20 April 1936. The siding was controlled by a 19-lever signal box named "Belle Vue". The siding was used again during the Second World War for ammunition storage.

Preceding station	Disused railways	Following station
Potton; Line and station closed	British Railways; Varsity Line	Old North Road; Line and station closed

== Present day ==
The main station building has survived as a private residence, surrounded by other newer houses. An industrial estate has been built on the trackbed immediately to the west, including the former goods yard site.
