= Gannocks Castle =

Castle in Tempsford, Bedfordshire, England

- Tempsford, Bedfordshire, England

Site information
- Type: Castle
- Condition: Moat and earthworks

Location
- Shown within Bedfordshire
- Coordinates: 52.16250°N 0.30488°W

Gannocks Castle is located in the village of Tempsford, in the county of Bedfordshire, England. It is located 6 miles east of Great Barford Castle and 9 miles east of Bedford Castle.

== History ==
Though called a castle, it was in truth a motte and bailey fortified manor house with a manorial complex, built by the Normans in the late 12th, or early 13th, century. It was built as a rectangular ward, enclosed by a moat, with a rampart. The small motte, located in the north-east section of the ward, is believed to have been the site of a beacon or timber tower.

There is belief that the castle was built on the site of a 10th-century Danish Viking fort. This belief is because the Danish Vikings, who had landed in East Anglia in 865, participated in a battle at Tempsford in 921, on the possible location where Gannocks castle was later built, although this is conjectural.

== Present ==
There is still some evidence of the castle, in the form of earthworks, and the moat still remains. Currently, the site is owned by Central Bedfordshire Council. The site is a Scheduled Monument, protected by law.

A geophysical survey of the castle site and adjoining playing field was organised by the Friends of Gannock Castle and carried out on 29 June 2004, by geophysical engineers, in the form of a Resistivity and Magnetometer survey.

A second geophysical survey of the surrounding fields to the west and south of the site was organised by the Friends of Gannocks Castle, and carried out on 1 December 2006, by geophysical engineers, in the form of a Fluxgate Gradiometer survey.

== Restoration ==
Restoration of Gannocks Castle was begun in 1998, with an opening day Medieval fair on 19 June 2006. The local Member of Parliament, Mr Alistair Burt MP, was a guest speaker. The fair featured a medieval re-enactment group, as well as wandering minstrels and dancers. Numerous stalls were set up, with demonstrations of crafts, archery, and medieval combat.

Additional improvements to the site include the installation of benches and bird/bat boxes; restoration of a wildflower area; tree and scrub management; installation of an interpretation board and creation of a 'Heritage' trail leaflet. The Heritage Trail leaflet can be downloaded from the Tempsford websites below.

A causeway was built across the Gannocks Castle moat, which is wet throughout the year, to allow greater access to the site. The causeway was not dug into the site, allowing it to be removed at a future date with no damage to the site.

The site contained extensive scrub which was cleared by the Friends of Gannocks Castle, Tempsford villagers and the Ivel & Ouse Countryside Project volunteers. Specialists were used when required. The wood was logged, dried, and used as fire wood by local villagers. Smaller cuttings were mulched and spread across the site.

The site is freely accessible in daylight hours. Car parking is by the side of Church Road, Tempsford and the site is signposted from the road.
