= Old North Road railway station =

Former railway station in Cambridgeshire, England

Coordinates: 52.1738°N 0.0774°W

Old North Road
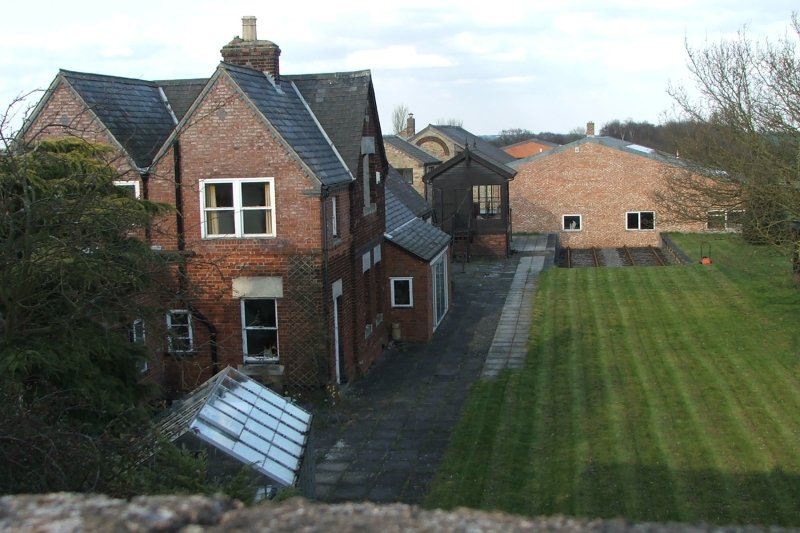
- Old North Road station in March 2009

General information
- Location: Longstowe, South Cambridgeshire; England
- Grid reference: TL316546
- Platforms: 2

Other information
- Status: Disused

History
- Original company: Bedford & Cambridge Railway
- Pre-grouping: London and North Western Railway
- Post-grouping: London, Midland and Scottish Railway; London Midland Region of British Railways (1948-1958); Eastern Region of British Railways (1958-1968)

Key dates
- 1 August 1862: Opened
- 19 April 1965: Closed to goods
- 1 January 1968: Closed to passengers
Location

Old North Road was a railway station on the Varsity Line which served the small village of Longstowe near Bourn in Cambridgeshire. As its name suggests, the station was located on the eastern side of the Old North Road, the A1198 road – a major Roman road which linked London with Lincoln. Opened in 1862, the station was located in a rural area and saw little passenger traffic; it closed together with the line in 1968.

== History ==
Old North Road station was opened by the Bedford & Cambridge Railway as part of its line from Bedford, the construction of which began in April 1861. The line was worked by the London and North Western Railway (LNWR) from its opening in 1862, which acquired the Bedford & Cambridge in 1865.

Simply laid out on the eastern side of the Old North Road which was crossed on the level, the station had two concrete facing platforms. The majority of the station buildings were situated on the northern Up side, including a goods shed and a type 5 LNWR signal box. A coal siding and cattle pens were located on the Down side.

| Preceding station | Disused railways | Following station |
|---|---|---|
| Gamlingay | British Railways; Varsity Line | Lord's Bridge |

== Present day ==
The station buildings, signal box and goods shed have survived in private ownership, but 3/4 of the platforms have been filled in.
