= Frederick Rawlins =

English cricketer

Personal information
- Full name: Frederick Rawlins
- Born: 28 September 1907; Blunham, Bedfordshire, England
- Died: 27 December 1968 (aged 61); Biddenham, Bedfordshire, England
- Batting: Right-handed

Domestic team information
- Years: Team
- 1930–1934: Minor Counties
- 1926–1935: Bedfordshire

Career statistics
Competition	First-class
Matches	2
Runs scored	110
Batting average	36.66
100s/50s	–/1
Top score	74
Balls bowled	–
Wickets	–
Bowling average	–
5 wickets in innings	–
10 wickets in match	–
Best bowling	–
Catches/stumpings	–/–
- Source: Cricinfo, 12 August 2012

Frederick Rawlins (28 September 1907 – 27 December 1968) was an English cricketer. Rawlins was a right-handed batsman. He was born at Blunham, Bedfordshire, and was educated at Wellingborough School.

Rawlins made his debut for Bedfordshire against the Kent Second XI in the 1926 Minor Counties Championship. He played minor counties cricket for Bedfordshire from 1926 to 1935, making seventy appearances, the last of which came against Cambridgeshire. Playing minor counties cricket for Bedfordshire allowed Rawlins to be selected to play for a combined Minor Counties cricket team, who he made his first-class debut for against Lancashire at Old Trafford in 1930. The Minor Counties won the toss and elected to bat first, making 216 all out, with Rawlins being dismissed for a duck by Len Hopwood. Lancashire then made 188 all out in their first-innings, to which the Minor Counties responded in their second-innings by reaching nine without loss, at which point the match was curtailed by rain and declared a draw. He later made a second first-class appearance for the team against Oxford University at the University Parks in 1934. The Minor Counties won the toss and elected to bat first, making 539/8 declared, with Rawlins scoring 74 runs before he was dismissed by Kenneth Jackson. Oxford University then made 469 all out in their first-innings, to which the Minor Counties responded in their second-innings by reaching 129/4, with Rawlins scoring 36 runs before he was dismissed by Jake Seamer. The match ended as a draw.

He died at Biddenham, Bedfordshire, on 27 December 1968.
