= Tempsford =

Village in Bedfordshire, England

Coordinates: 52.16748°N 0.29804°W

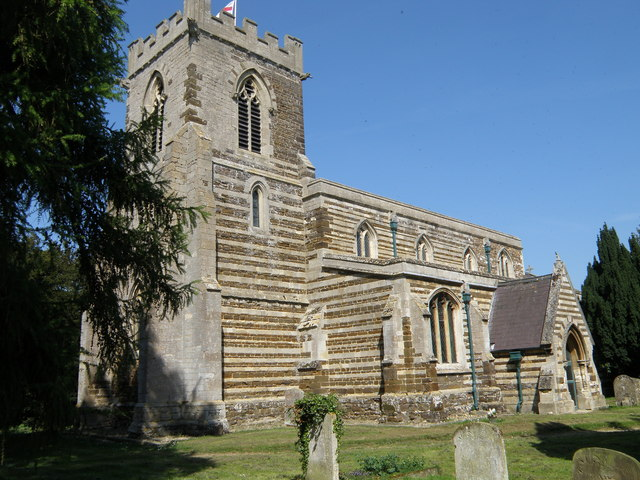
- Church of St Peter

- Location within Bedfordshire
- Population: 564 (2001); 590 (2011 Census)
- OS grid reference: TL164539
- Civil parish: Tempsford
- Unitary authority: Central Bedfordshire
- Ceremonial county: Bedfordshire
- Region: East
- Country: England
- Sovereign state: United Kingdom
- Post town: SANDY
- Postcode district: SG19
- Dialling code: 01767
- Police: Bedfordshire
- Fire: Bedfordshire
- Ambulance: East of England
- UK Parliament: North Bedfordshire

Tempsford is a village and civil parish in the Central Bedfordshire district of the county of Bedfordshire, England, about 7 miles (11 km) east north-east of the county town of Bedford.

The village is split by the A1 Great North Road and is located just south of its junction with the A421 at the Black Cat roundabout. To the east of the village is the site of the former RAF Tempsford airfield.

In September 2025, the government announced Tempsford as the site for a new town, with work to begin "before the next election".

== Geography ==
Tempsford is 2.3 miles (4 km) north of Sandy, 18 miles (29 km) west of Cambridge and 46 miles (74 km) north of Central London.

Tempsford has two main areas bisected by the A1 road: Church End to the west and Langford End (Station Road) to the east. Tempsford Hall and park lie between the two.

The rivers Great Ouse and Ivel form a large part of the parish's western boundary. The East Coast Main Line railway passes through the parish.

Area

The civil parish covers an area of 1,170 hectares (2,891 acres).

Landscape

The village lies within the Bedfordshire and Cambridgeshire Claylands as designated by Natural England. Central Bedfordshire Council has classified the local landscape around the village as the Great Ouse Clay Valley; a shallow, fairly wide valley of the Great Ouse and Ivel. The surrounding area is mostly arable farmland. Pastures are found alongside the rivers. Grass parkland surrounds Tempsford Hall and there is an area of woodland at the eastern edge of the park. Hedgerows are often gappy or lost but some hedgerow trees are present. Off the eastern bank of the Ivel at the southernmost point of the parish is a lake formed from a disused sand and gravel pit. Outlying areas to the north and east form part of the predominantly flat, Biggin Wood Clay Vale.

Elevation

The village centre is 24 metres (79 ft) above sea level. The whole parish is low lying and flat with the highest point just over 50 metres (164 ft) at Sir John's Wood in the far north-east.

Geology and soil type

The village lies mainly on first and second terrace river gravel. Alluvium borders the Great Ouse and Ivel rivers. There are patches of boulder clay, and the eastern and northern parts of the parish are on Oxford clay overlying Kellaways beds. Around the village the soil has low fertility, is freely draining and slightly acid with a loamy texture. The eastern area of the parish has highly fertile, lime-rich loamy and clayey soils with impeded drainage. By the Ivel and Great Ouse are loamy and clayey floodplain soils with naturally high groundwater.

The night sky and light pollution

Light pollution is the level of radiance (night lights) shining up into the night sky. The Campaign to Protect Rural England (CPRE) divides the level of night sky brightness into 9 bands with band 1 being the darkest i.e. with the lowest level of light pollution and band 9 the brightest and most polluted. Tempsford in band 6 is adversely affected by lighting along the A1 road.

The built environment

Along Station Road are a number of Grade II listed, late 17th-century, colour-washed, roughcast-rendered, thatched cottages. Also, Victorian workers' cottages built by the Tempsford Estate in yellow brick with red brick facing, farm houses, barns, local authority and modern private houses.

At Church End the former White Hart public house dates from the 16th century and is timber framed with a jettied gable and clay tile roof.

Roads and bridges

The A1 northbound carriageway is carried over the Ouse by a sandstone bridge built in October 1820. Listing particulars state the bridge to be about 50 metres (164 ft) long and 10 metres (33 ft) wide. There are three broad, low arches built with blocks of Bramley Fall stone from a quarry near Leeds. A rounded towpath archway passes through the east abutment. A sandstone parapet rests on a projecting stone string course. Except where replaced by concrete, Bramley Fall stone copings run the length of the bridge. Inscriptions of masons can be seen on the inside face of the copings over the crown of the centre arch. Flood bridges to the east and west have seven smaller and lower segmental brick arches. A separate bridge was built for the southbound carriageway when the road was dualled in the early 1960s.

The A1 Trunk Road (Tempsford Junction Improvements Slip Roads) Order 1999 authorised the construction of new slip roads to access the A1 and the scheme was completed in 2001. A slip road from the southbound carriageway joins the road from Little Barford, which was extended south through Tempsford Hall Park to a new roundabout. A bridge across the A1 and a second roundabout were built to access the northbound carriageway and the roads to Blunham and Church End. The road to Church End became a no through road.

Public footpaths

A public footpath on the eastern side of the Station Road level crossing runs south then east to Everton. A stretch of the Kingfisher Way runs from Mill Lane alongside the Ivel to Blunham. In 2001 an extensive metal footbridge over the A1 was constructed which links Station Road with the former Anchor Hotel, Memorial Hall and Church End.

== History ==
Prehistoric finds recovered from the Tempsford area include stone tools and other artefacts dating from the Palaeolithic, Mesolithic and Neolithic periods. South of Tempsford Church End and east of the River Ivel are cropmarks of ring ditch round barrows. Archaeological excavations carried out in Tempsford Hall park in 1999 found sherds of Roman pottery, ditches relating to middle to late Saxon enclosures and a complete Maxey ware bar-lug vessel.

Tempsford has had a multitude of name variations over the years. The village was known as Tamiseforde in the Domesday Book of 1086. The meaning is disputed. Some historians surmise that this stretch of the Ouse was once known as the Thames, while others believe it to mean the 'ford on the road to the Thames' (in London).

In 917 Tempsford was a fortified Danish burh where, following an unsuccessful attack on Bedford, the Battle of Tempsford took place. The Danes were defeated by an English army led by King Edward the Elder.

Gannocks Castle, a scheduled ancient monument to the west of Church End, was a motte and bailey fortified manor house built by the Normans in the late 12th or early 13th century. Earthworks and the moat can be seen.

East of the railway line are the well-defined remains of a medieval moated enclosure at Biggin Wood. The square and flat enclosure measures some 67 metres (220 ft) across inclusive of the 8 metres (26 ft) wide surrounding moat. The partially water-filled ditches form a complete circuit apart from an infilled section at the north-east corner.

A wooden bridge over the Ouse was completed in 1736. It was replaced by a stone bridge in 1820.

Tempsford was enclosed by Act of Parliament in 1777.

After enclosure, Sir Gillies Payne, Lord of the Manors of Tempsford, Drayton and Brays laid out Tempsford Park and built a mansion house. The manors were sold to William Stuart in 1830. In November 1898 the house was destroyed by fire. A new hall was built in 1904, which stands today.

Population growth in Tempsford since 1801
Year	Pop.	±%
1801	409	—
1841	561	+37.2%
1881	535	−4.6%
1921	468	−12.5%
1961	491	+4.9%
2001	566	+15.3%

Tempsford railway station existed from 1863 to 1965, although passenger traffic ceased in 1956.

Tempsford School opened in September 1869. Bedfordshire Records & Archives Service hold log books detailing day-to-day events in the school's history. The school closed in July 1983. The building is now the registered office of Tempsford Stained Glass Ltd.

Tempsford Airfield was constructed in 1940–1941.

A village shop on Station Road was in business from 1905 until 1989. Next door was The Black Horse public house which closed in 1967.

Church Street was part of the Great North Road until bypassed in 1961.

== Governance ==
The parish council consists of seven elected councillors who serve a four-year term. Tempsford is part of Potton ward for elections to the Central Bedfordshire Unitary Authority.

Prior to 1894, Tempsford was administered as part of the hundred of Biggleswade. From 1894 until 1974 it was in Biggleswade Rural District and from 1974 to 2009 in Mid Bedfordshire District.

Tempsford was in the Mid Bedfordshire parliamentary constituency until 1997. It was then in North East Bedfordshire until 2024, when it became part of North Bedfordshire. The elected member is Richard Fuller of the Conservative Party.

== Public services ==
The village is in Anglian Water's Sandy Public Water Supply Zone (MW46). The water supply is sourced from either river or reservoirs, and is chloraminated and classed as very hard. There is a waste water treatment works off the road to Little Barford.

The Eastern Power Area of UK Power Networks is the distribution network operator for electricity. Cadent Gas owns and operates the area's gas distribution network.

The nearest general hospital is Bedford (Bedford Hospital NHS Trust). Ambulance services are provided by the East of England Ambulance Service NHS Trust, fire and rescue services by Bedfordshire Fire and Rescue Service, and policing by Bedfordshire Police

The nearest public library and post office are at Sandy.

== Economy ==
Tempsford Hall was the head office of construction firm Kier Group from 1967. They were the biggest local employer until they relocated, in 2020, to an office block in Manchester.

Straddling the parish border with Sandy is Flamingo Flowers, a wholesaler of flowers and plants, formerly known as Zwetsloots. Cornelius Zwetsloot came from Holland in 1932 and established a tulip bulb growing company under glass. Flowers and market gardening crops were a source of business until 1948, before the nursery began to specialise in floriculture rather than horticulture. The Zwetsloot brothers sold 80% of the ordinary shares to Flamingo Holdings in August 2002 and the remaining 20% a year later.

== Community ==
The Tempsford Stuart Memorial Village Hall was built in 1924 by the Stuart family of Tempsford Hall in memory of their son and fourteen other Tempsford men who lost their lives in the First World War. The main hall can accommodate up to 150 people and has a stage suitable for theatrical productions or concerts and a maple wood sprung dance floor.

The annual Tempsford Show at the village hall has attractions such as a dog show, bouncy castle, coconut shy, craft stalls, vintage tractors and cars, and a tombola. There are competition classes for fruit, vegetable, floral, culinary, and art and craft exhibits.

Records pertaining to The Wheatsheaf public house go back to 1807. In December 2013, Prince Charles visited and was photographed holding a glass of beer after attending a Service of Dedication and unveiling a memorial to honour and remember the women agents who flew out of RAF Tempsford to aid resistance movements in occupied Europe.

A children's play area and farm shop are on Station Road.

Tempsford Millennium Garden Sanctuary was part of the parkland surrounding the original entrance to Tempsford Hall. The land was compulsorily purchased in the early 1960s to construct the A1 trunk road. The 1.5 acres (1 ha) site was left as a small woodland. The garden, which opened in 2000 is owned and maintained by the parish council.

The Tempsford Times magazine which reports on parish council meetings, church and village events is published bimonthly and distributed free to residents.

Tempsford Football Club was founded in 2019 and is based at Meltis Social Club in Bedford. The club competes in the men's Bedford and District Sunday Football League.

== Churches ==
The Church of St Peter dating from the 14th century is constructed of coursed ironstone, cobbles and clunch with large parts of clunch and ironstone banding. Considerable repairs were made in 1621, especially in the south-west part of the church and the tower. The whole building was restored in 1874.

Tempsford Methodist Church was built in 1804 and was in the St Neots and Huntingdon Circuit, however in 2023 the church closed down. A Sunday School building was added to the rear in 1878.

== Public transport ==
Weekly buses to Biggleswade, St Neots and Cambridge are run by community, non-profit operator Ivel Sprinter. Services began in 1991 in response to requests from Tempsford residents.

There is a plan to open a new railway station in Tempsford as part of the development of East West Rail, a new line between Oxford and Cambridge. The old Tempsford railway station closed in 1956, and as of 2023, the nearest railway station is at Sandy.

== Future expansion ==
In January 2025, the plans for early construction of the new railway station opened speculation that it would be to serve a substantially larger population. In September 2025, housing secretary Steve Reed announced Tempsford as the site for a new town, with work to begin "before the next election".
