= Bedfordshire and Luton Archives and Records Service =

- Formation: 1913
- Type: County records service
- Headquarters: Riverside Building, Borough Hall
- Location: Bedford, England
- Region served: Bedfordshire
- Parent organization: Bedford Borough Council; Central Bedfordshire Council; Luton Borough Council

The Bedfordshire and Luton Archives and Records Service is a county record office, holding archival material associated with Bedfordshire and Luton. Established in 1913 by George Herbert Fowler (1861-1940) as the Bedfordshire Record Office, it was the first county record office in England. It is located in Bedford.
