= Potton railway station =

Former railway station in Bedfordshire, England

Coordinates: 52.1281°N 0.2207°W

Potton
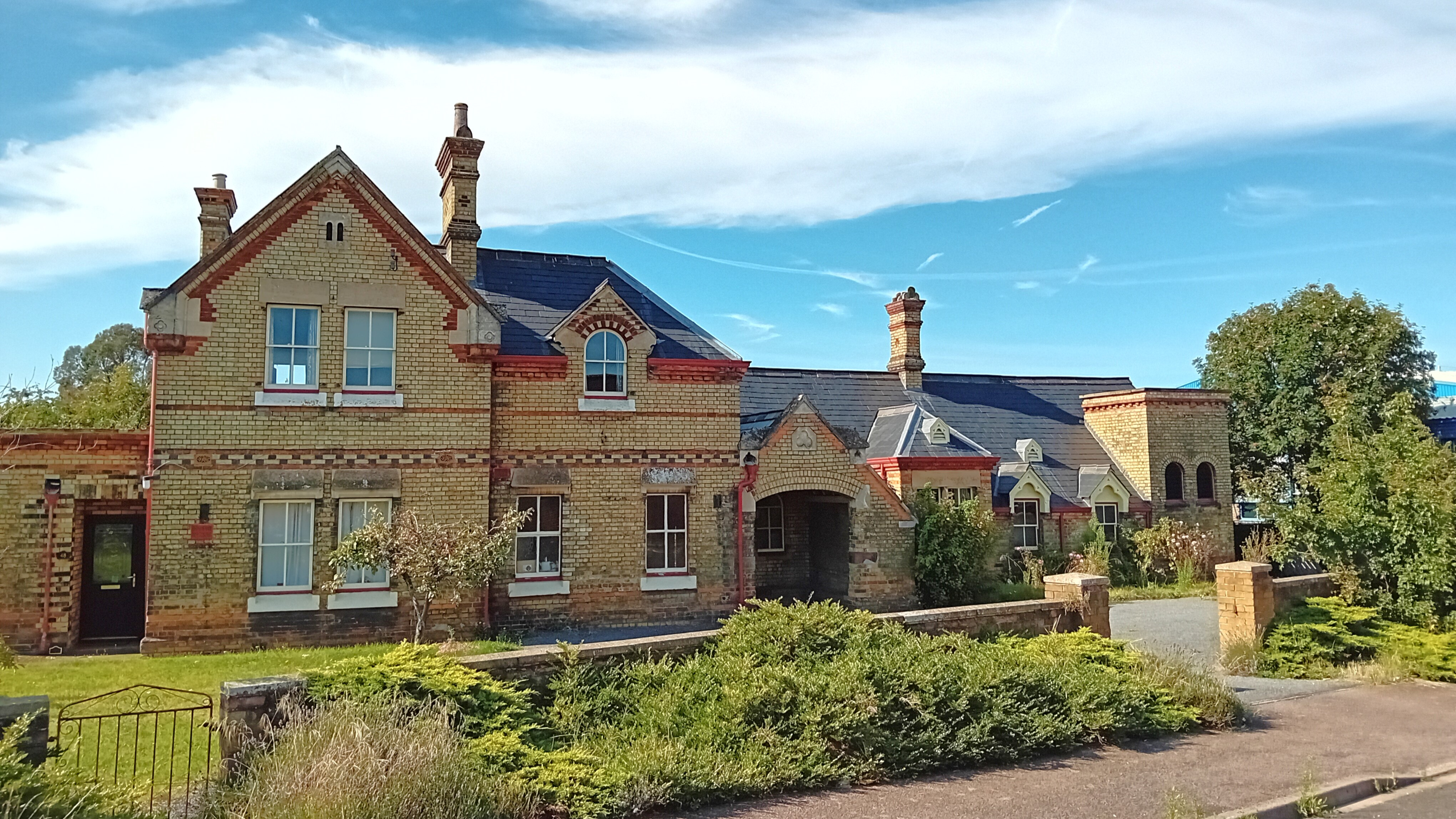

General information
- Location: Potton, Central Bedfordshire; England
- Grid reference: TL219493
- Platforms: 2

Other information
- Status: Disused

History
- Original company: Sandy and Potton Railway
- Pre-grouping: Bedford and Cambridge Railway; London and North Western Railway
- Post-grouping: London, Midland and Scottish Railway; London Midland Region of British Railways (1948-1958); Eastern Region of British Railways (1958-1968)

Key dates
- November 1857: Opened
- January 1862: Closed
- 31 July 1862: Reopened
- 1 January 1966: Closed to goods
- 1 January 1968: Closed to passengers
Location

Potton was a railway station on the Varsity Line which served the small town of the same name in Bedfordshire. Opened in 1857 as part of Sir William Peel's Sandy and Potton Railway, the station was initially situated further south near the Biggleswade Road. Upon being taken over by the Bedford and Cambridge Railway in 1862 a new station was opened which remained in service for over one hundred years before closing in 1968. The station building has survived and is now a private house.

== History ==
=== Sandy and Potton Railway ===
Following the opening of Sandy railway station by the Great Northern Railway in 1850, local landowner Captain William Peel, third son of former Prime Minister Sir Robert Peel, saw the benefits of a connecting link to Potton and added his voice to those of local traders who were calling for the construction of a line. Peel, the owner of an estate of around 1,400 acres (5.7 km^{2}) between Potton and Sandy, offered to give permission for the line to cross his land and, furthermore, to construct it at his own expense. Construction began in May 1856 and by 25 June 1857 was ready for opening to goods traffic. The line, 3 miles (4.8 km) and 2 furlongs long and built at a cost of £15,000, did not require an act of Parliament as it ran through private land owned by Captain Peel.

The Sandy and Potton Railway was worked by a small 0-4-0 well-tank engine built at a cost of £800 by George England and Co. in Hatcham. Captain Peel named the engine Shannon after HMS Shannon, a frigate which he had commanded in the Far East in the year it was built. The outlay in constructing the railway was soon recovered through the fruit and vegetable traffic carried from Peel's estate and the manure and fertiliser transported in, turning a £70 per annum profit for his estate in 1853 to one of £500 per annum in 1858. Passenger traffic commenced in November 1857 after an inspection from the Board of Trade. The initial station at Potton was equipped with very basic facilities; there was no booking office or passenger waiting room. A goods shed, small staff office and locomotive shed were however provided. The station was sited in a field to the west of the Biggleswade Road.

=== Station buildings ===
The Sandy and Potton Railway was acquired by the Bedford and Cambridge Railway in 1860, which intended to make the route part of a longer line to Cambridge. Track was relaid and Potton station was resited north to its current position. A more substantial two-platformed station was provided with a cast-iron glass canopy supported by stanchions on the Up platform bearing the Bedford and Cambridge's initials in script letters. The majority of the station's buildings were situated on the Up side, including the goods shed, cattle pens and water tank with steam pump (the only one between Sandy and Cambridge). A small waiting shelter was provided on the Down side, linked by a footbridge, for passengers. The station saw much outward traffic in agricultural goods, such as potatoes and onions, and inward traffic of manure and fertiliser, much coming from stables in London and the London Zoo. A siding led to the south of the station where it served a sandpit used by Beart's Brick Company from October 1870.

=== Closure ===
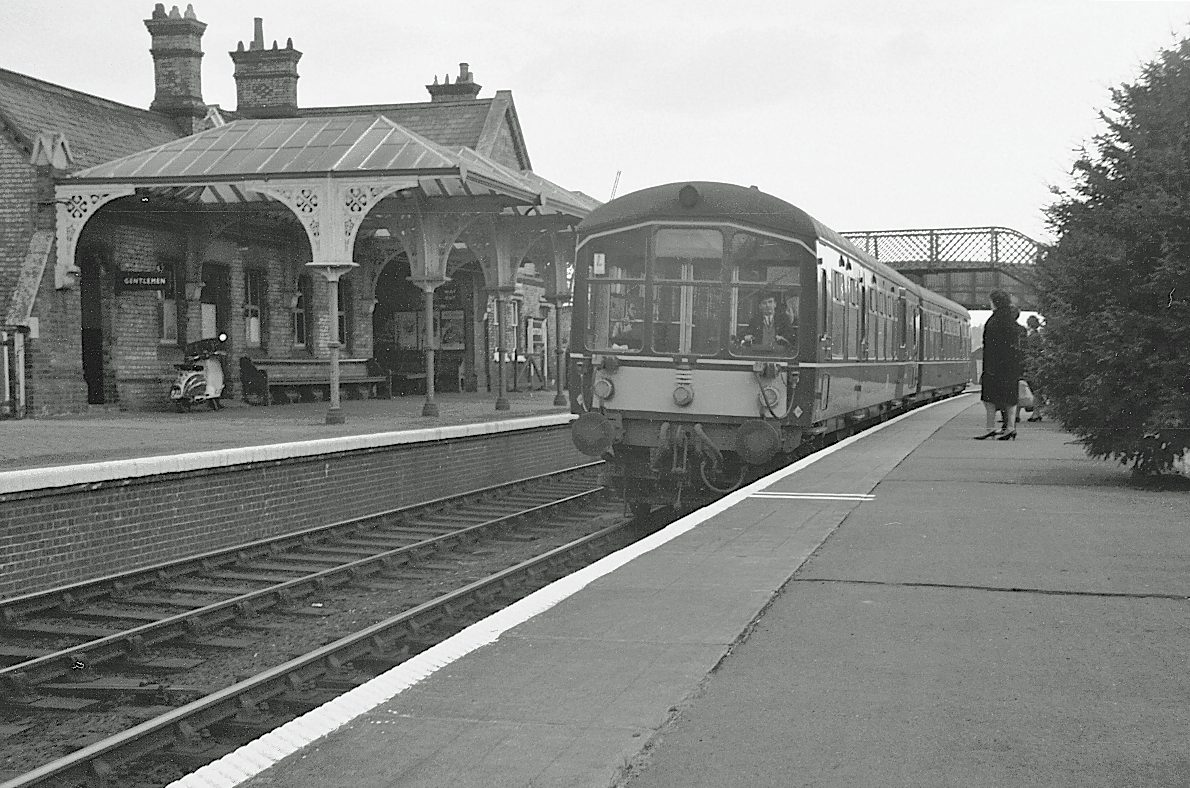
A Cambridge-bound DMU arrives shortly before closure, December 1967

Although the arrival of the railway had helped boost the town's population to around 2,000 by 1937, the line found itself proposed for closure first in 1959 and then again in 1963, before eventually closing in 1968. The idea of preserving the line between Sandy and Potton was discussed at a public meeting at Sandy which resulted in the formation of the Sandy & Potton Steam Railway Society. The organisation was, however, unable to raise outright the purchase price asked for by British Railways and the scheme failed despite the support of Sandy Urban District Council. Track removal began in July 1969 and the society was eventually wound-up.

| Preceding station | Disused railways | Following station |
|---|---|---|
| Sandy | British Railways; Varsity Line | Gamlingay |

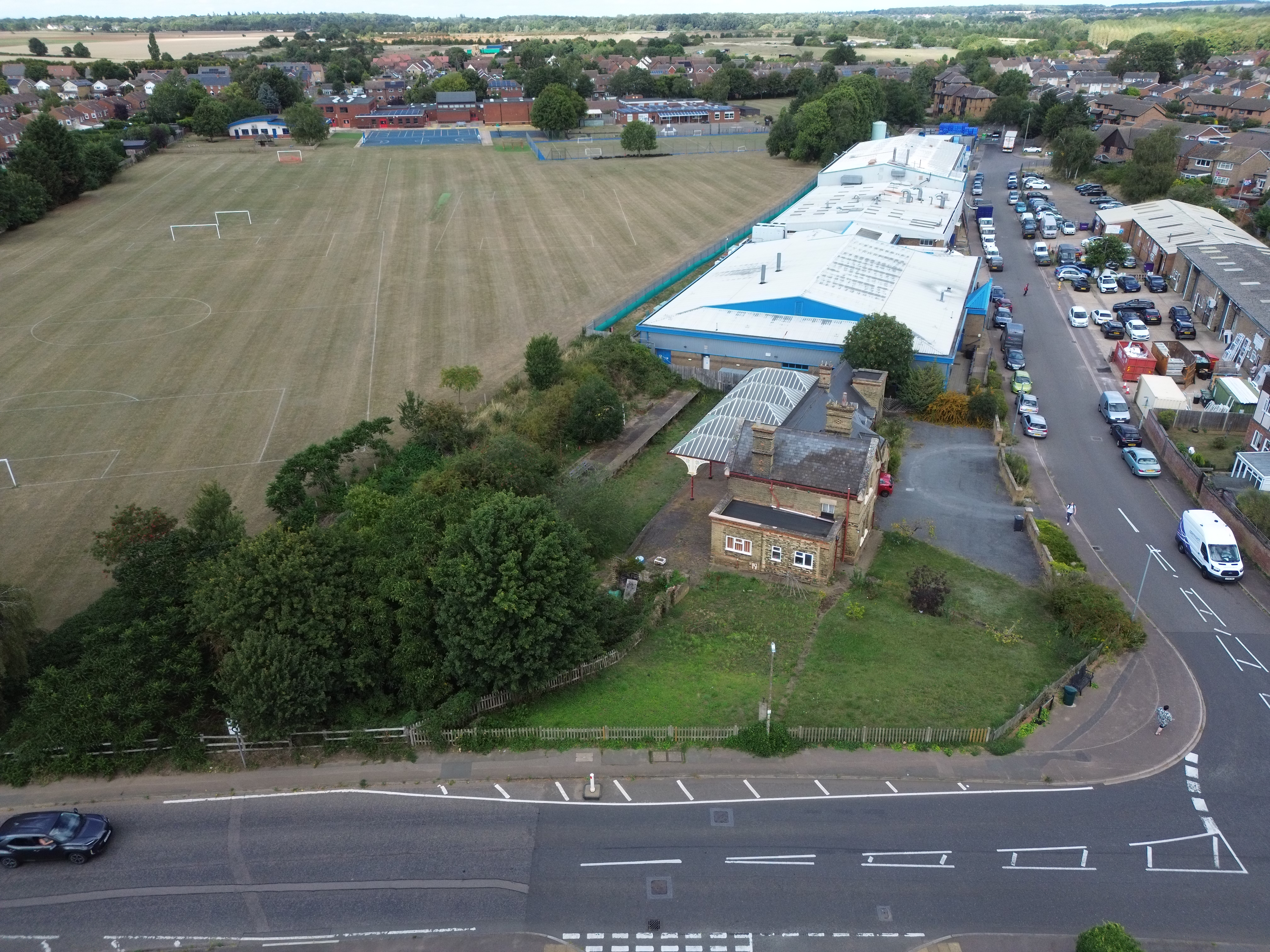
Potton Railway Station - as seen from above - August 2025

== Post-closure ==
The station was purchased by George Howe, a former railwayman, who restored the yellow gault brick main passenger building as a private residence. The goods shed from the first Potton station survives as a vegetable store. The locomotive known as "Shannon", which was later used on the Wantage Tramway, is now a stationary exhibit at the Didcot Railway Centre.

== See also ==
- Beeching cuts

== Bibliography ==
- Butt, Raymond V. J. (1995). The Directory of Railway Stations. Sparkford: Patrick Stephens. ISBN 1-85260-508-1.
- Clinker, C. R. (October 1978). Clinker's Register of Closed Passenger Stations and Goods Depots in England, Scotland and Wales 1830-1977. Bristol: Avon-Anglia Publications & Services. ISBN 0-905466-19-5.
- Davies, Reginald; Grant, M. D. (1984). Forgotten Railways: Chilterns and Cotswolds. Newton Abbot, Devon: David St John Thomas. ISBN 0-946537-07-0.
- Mitchell, Vic; Smith, Keith (February 2007). Bletchley to Cambridge featuring Bedford St. Johns. Midhurst, West Sussex: Middleton Press. ISBN 978-1-904474-94-4.
- Oppitz, Leslie (2000). Lost Railways of the Chilterns. Lost Railways Series. Newbury, Berkshire: Countryside Books. ISBN 978-1-85306-643-6.
- Simpson, Bill (1981). Oxford to Cambridge Railway. Vol. 2. Poole, Dorset: Oxford Publishing Co. ISBN 0-86093-121-8.
- Simpson, Bill (2000). The Oxford to Cambridge Railway: Forty Years On 1960-2000. Witney, Oxford: Lamplight Publications. ISBN 1-899246-05-3.
