= Tony Norris =

English ornithologist

Cuthbert Antony Norris (9 January 1917 in Cradley, Worcestershire – 25 February 2005 in Worcester) was an English ornithologist. He was a member of the RSPB's council in the 1950s and 1960s, chairing its finance and general purposes committee. During that time, he persuaded the organisation to move from London to its current headquarters at The Lodge, Sandy, Bedfordshire. Using his own money to facilitate the transaction he was, for one day, owner of the Lodge.

Norris was BTO President from 1961–1964 and was awarded their Bernard Tucker Medal in 1959. He was also secretary and chairman of the West Midland Bird Club from 1953–1975 and its president from 1975–1999. He was the youngest member of the British Ornithologists' Union. He was the instigator of the Bardsey Bird and Field Observatory and was the youngest member of the British Ornithologists' Union.

In December 1958 he presented a talk on the BBC Home Service, In Search of Prunella, about the alpine accentor (Prunella collaris).

In 1940, he married Cicely Hurcomb, daughter of Lord Hurcomb, and they had two daughters. During World War II, he was a Colonel in the British army responsible for a unit of troops from Sierra Leone, fighting the Japanese in Burma. He later ran a garden nursery in the Malvern area of Worcestershire and specialised in growing South African nerine lilies, for which he was awarded an RHS gold medal. Cicely died in 1976 and in 1985 Norris bred a Nerine 'Cicely Norris', named in her honour.

He was a personal friend of Peter Scott and assisted him in setting up the Wildfowl and Wetlands Trust. He was also a friend of and supplier of much of his nerine collection to Monty Hollows, New Zealand’s pioneering nerine breeder and producer.

== Bibliography ==
(incomplete)

- The Distribution and Status of the Corncrake
- — (1947). Notes on the Birds of Warwickshire. Cornish Brothers. Archived from the original on 19 March 2012.
- — (1951). The Birds of Warwickshire, Worcestershire and Staffordshire. RSPB Occasional Publication. Vol. 17. Royal Society for the Protection of Birds. p. 16.
- — (1951). West Midland Bird Distribution Survey. West Midland Bird Club. Archived from the original on 5 February 2012. (published for private circulation)
