= Sandy Secondary School =

Coordinates: 52.137°N 0.290°W

Location
- Engayne Avenue; Sandy, Bedfordshire, SG19 1BL; England

Information
- Type: Foundation school
- Department for Education URN: 109669 Tables
- Ofsted: Reports
- Principal: Karen Hayward
- Gender: Co-educational
- Age: 11 to 18
- Enrolment: 1009 (As of 2024)
- Capacity: 1155 (As of 2024)
- Website: www.sandysecondaryschool.com

Sandy Secondary School (formerly Sandy Upper School) is a coeducational secondary school, located in Sandy, Bedfordshire, England.

The school educates 11–16 year-olds, mainly from the town of Sandy, Great Barford, Potton and the surrounding villages. In addition, the school offers further education for 16–18 year-olds through its sixth form department.

== History ==
Previously an upper school educating pupils from the age of 13, in September 2018 Sandy became a secondary school educating pupils from the age of 11.

The school was designated as a Sports College in 2003. As a result of this, the school improved its sporting facilities and hired specialised sports teaching staff.

Preparations for the planned academy conversion were controversial with pupils and students, including a requirement for year 10 students to drop one of their GCSE courses. The move to academy status was cancelled after financial irregularities were uncovered at the Barnfield Federation.

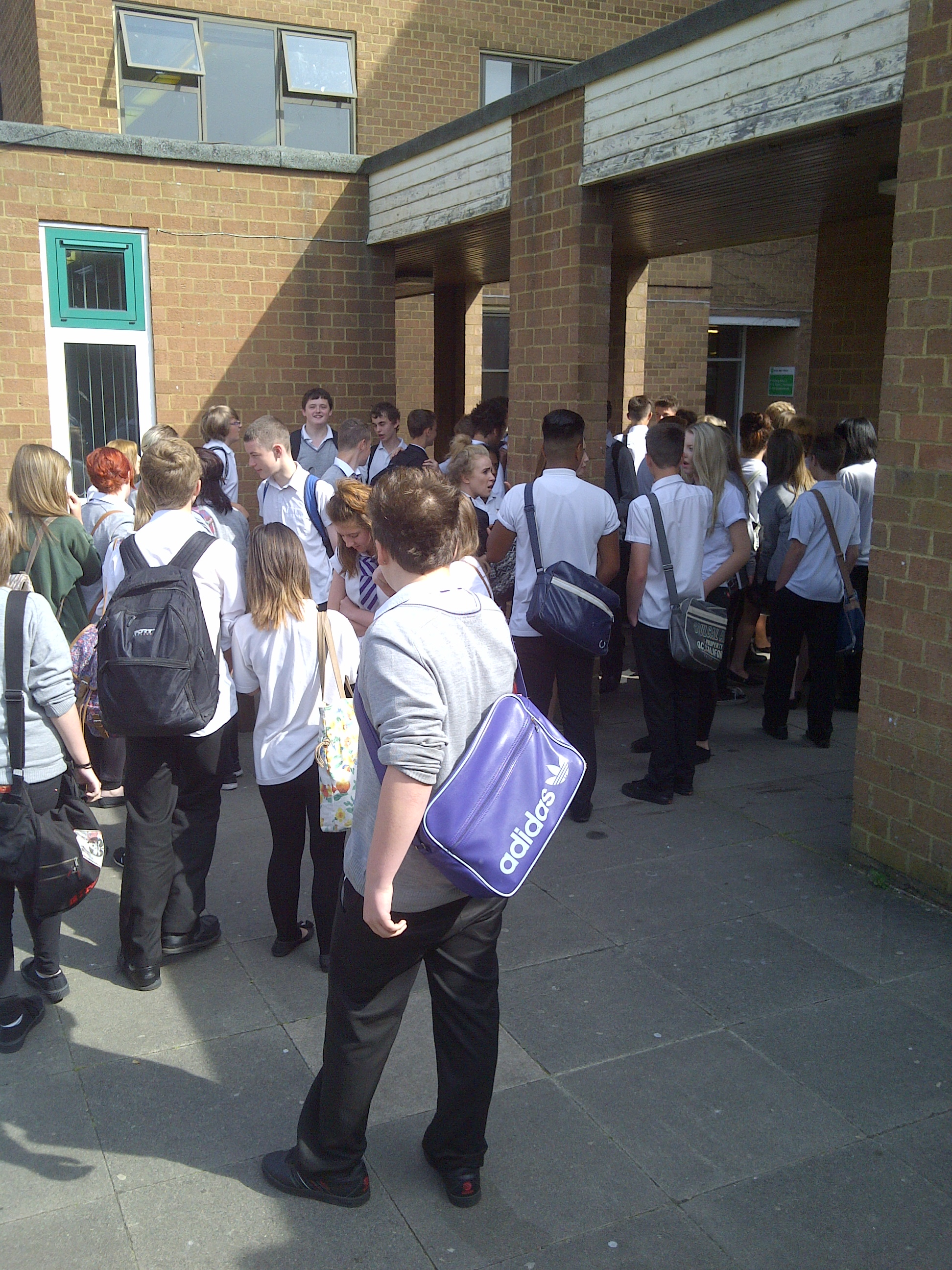
Pupils at Sandy Secondary School protesting about changes to their GCSE choices

In January 2013 the Governing Body of Sandy Secondary School voted not to enter into advanced negotiations with the Barnfield Federation, with the intention of Sandy Secondary School becoming a sponsored academy.

== Academic performance and inspections ==
The school received an 'Inadequate' inspection rating from Ofsted at the start of 2013 where the school was subsequently put in special measures.

As of 2024, the school's most recent inspection was in January 2023, with an outcome of Requires Improvement.

In 2023, the school's Progress 8 benchmark at GCSE was average. The proportion of children achieving grade 5 or above in English and mathematics GCSE was 34%, lower than the overall figure for the local authority and the England figure. The figure for children entering the English Baccalaureate in 2023 was 78%, higher than the overall figure for the local authority and the England figure.

The average score at A-level in 2023 was C, compared to B− in the local authority as a whole and B in England.
