= The Roundabout Club =

Events venue in Sandy, Bedfordshire, England

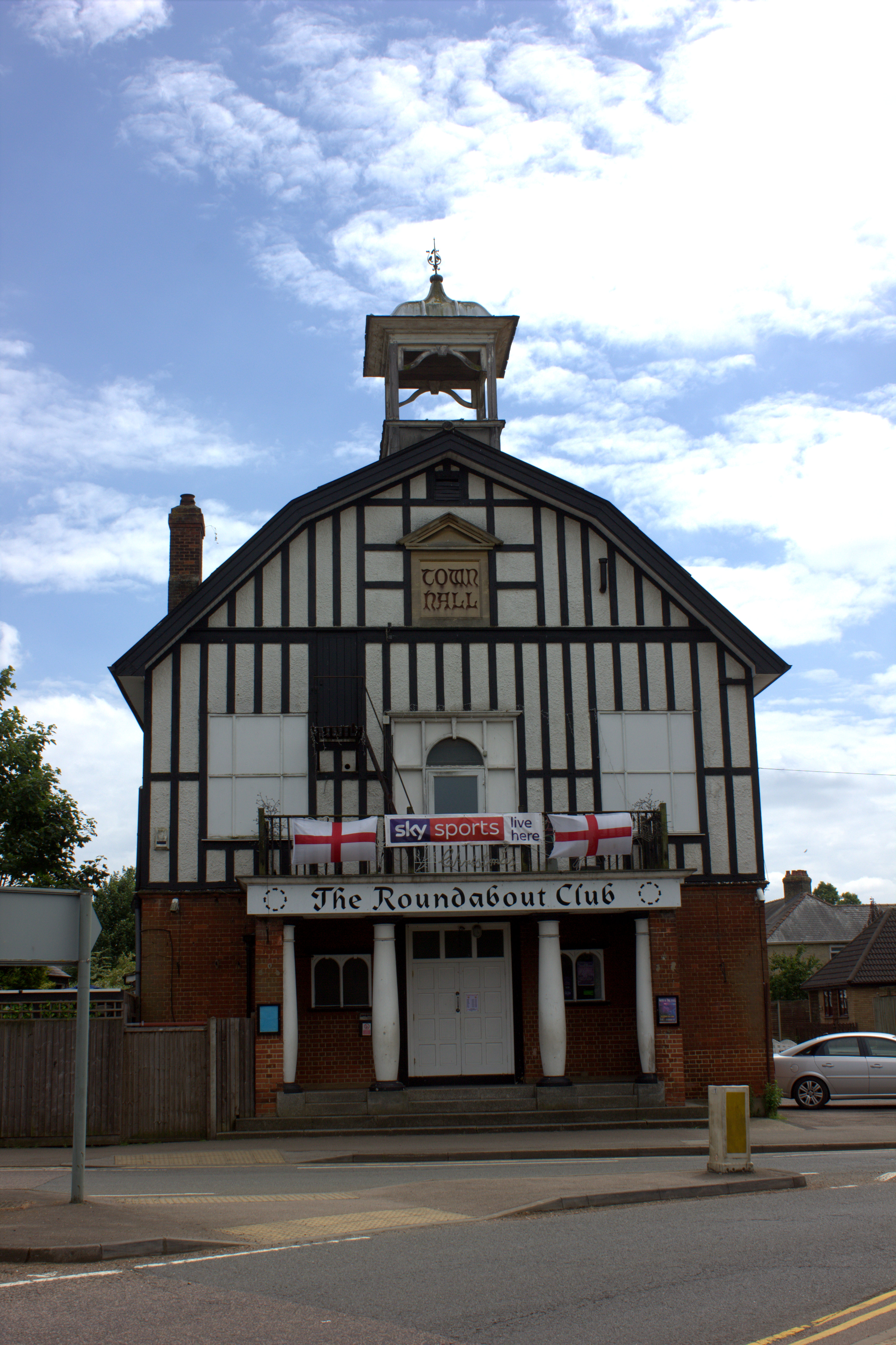
- The building in 2018

- Shown in Bedfordshire
- 52.1293°N 0.2901°W
- Location: Bedford Road, Sandy

History
- Built: 1906

Site notes
- Architect: Alfred Ernest Anthony
- Architectural style: Tudor Revival style

The Roundabout Club, formerly Sandy Town Hall, is a bar and music venue in Sandy, Bedfordshire, a town in England. It has never been the meeting place of any of the local authorities in the area.

== History ==
In January 1904, a group of local businessmen, linked to the Liberal Party, formed a private company, known as the "Town Hall Company", to finance and commission a public events venue for the town. The group was led by a pioneer of the smallholdings movement, Sir Robert Edgcumbe, who lived at Sandye Place. The site they selected was open land just to the west of the local Baptist chapel.

The new building was designed by Alfred Ernest Anthony of Usher & Anthony in the Tudor Revival style, built in brick with exposed timbers by a local contractor, Messrs. Haynes and Fennemore, and was opened as Sandy Town Hall in September 1906. The design involved a symmetrical main frontage of three bays facing onto Bedford Road. The central bay featured a wide single storey portico formed by four Tuscan order columns supporting an entablature, a cornice and a balcony. The first floor was rendered, with an ornamental half-timbered effect, and fenestrated with three casement windows. There was a pedimented stone inscribed with the words "town hall" in the centre of the gable which was surmounted by a belltower.

During the First World War, the building accommodated a Voluntary Aid Detachment hospital. In 1920, the building was converted into a venue for silent film shows known as the "Victory Cinema", with a capacity of 400 people and a proscenium arch which was 25 feet (7.6 m) wide. Silent film shows were accompanied by music from the Sandy String Band. The venue was later taken over by the Cox Cinema Company, based in Biggleswade. The cinema was damaged in a fire in 1948, but was restored and reopened in 1950 as the "Albany Cinema". It closed in February 1964, but was occasionally used by the Sandy Film Club to show films over the next few years. By 1981, it had been converted into "The Roundabout Club".

Although the building has never been the meeting place of either the former urban district council or the local parish council, now the town council, the pavement in front of the building performs a civic role as the location for the saluting stand for the annual military parade held each Remembrance Sunday.
