= Cyril Hurcomb, 1st Baron Hurcomb =

British civil servant

Cyril William Hurcomb, 1st Baron Hurcomb, (18 February 1883 – 7 August 1975) was a British civil servant.

== Career ==
Hurcomb was Permanent Under-Secretary of the Ministry of Transport from 1927 to 1937; of the Ministry of Shipping from 1939; and then of its successor the Ministry of War Transport from 1941 until 1947. He was the first chairman of the British Transport Commission between 1948 and 1953. He was also a keen ornithologist and conservationist, and played a key role in the 1954 Protection of Birds Act. He served as chairman of the Royal Society for the Protection of Birds' council, as president of the RSPB, and president of the West Midland Bird Club from 1960 to 1975 (when he was succeeded by his son-in-law, Tony Norris, the husband of his daughter Cicely Hurcomb (d. 1976). In July 1950 he was elevated to the peerage as Baron Hurcomb, of Campden Hill in the Royal Borough of Kensington.

He was awarded by the Netherlands with a Grand Officer in the Order of Orange-Nassau by Royal Decree no. 34 of 13 January 1947 ("in recognition of services to Netherlands interests during the war"). For this he retained British permission to accept and wear on 19 January 1948. He was also a Grand Officer of the Order of the Crown (Belgium) and Grand Cross of the Order of St. Olav. The BR Standard Class 7 locomotive number 70001 was named Lord Hurcomb in his honour.

== Personal life ==
Hurcomb died in August 1975, aged 92; the barony became extinct.

== Bibliography ==
- Lord, John; Dennis Johnstone Munns; T. K. Beck; A. J. Richards (1970). Atlas of breeding birds of the West Midlands. London: Published for the West Midland Bird Club (by) Collins. pp. 3–276p (chiefly illus, form, maps), 20 cm. ISBN 0-00-211040-7. Hurcomb wrote the foreword.
- Lockley, Ronald (1977). Orielton, The human and natural history of a Welsh manor. London: André Deutsch Limited. pp. 271–278. description by Ronald Lockley of Hurcomb's involvement in establishing the Pembrokeshire Coast National Park.

Business positions
First	Chairman of the British Transport Commission; 1948–1953	Succeeded by Sir Brian Robertson
Peerage of the United Kingdom
New creation	Baron Hurcomb; 1950–1975	Extinct
