= Beeston, Bedfordshire =

Village in Bedfordshire, England

Coordinates: 52.119°N 0.295°W

Beeston
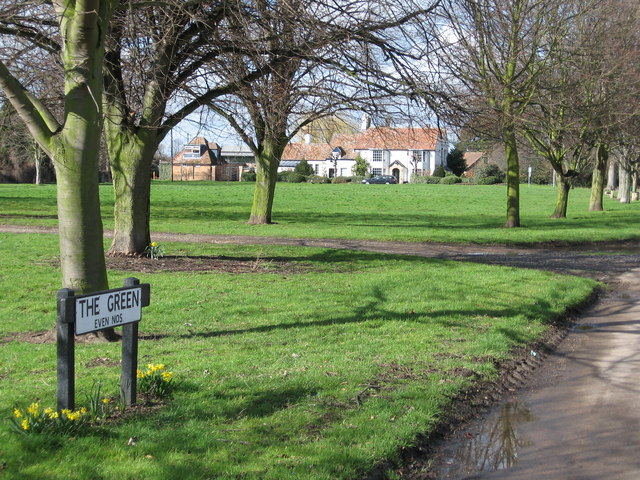
- Beeston Green

- Location within Bedfordshire
- OS grid reference: TL168482
- Civil parish: Sandy
- Unitary authority: Central Bedfordshire
- Ceremonial county: Bedfordshire
- Region: East
- Country: England
- Sovereign state: United Kingdom
- Post town: Sandy
- Postcode district: SG19
- Dialling code: 01767
- Police: Bedfordshire
- Fire: Bedfordshire
- Ambulance: East of England
- UK Parliament: North Bedfordshire

Beeston is a village in the civil parish of Sandy in Central Bedfordshire, ceremonial county of Bedfordshire, England. The village lies about half a mile south of Sandy, north of Biggleswade and east of Bedford.

Beeston appears in the Domesday Book of 1086 where it shown as having a mill: "Bistone: Roland, Norman and Pirot from Eudo FitzHubert; William Speke; Thurstan the Chamberlain; Godmund; Alwin from the King. Mill."

The medieval period saw the construction of the Great North Road, the post road connecting London to Edinburgh, which ran through Beeston. In the 1930s the Ministry of Transport upgraded the Great North Road to a trunk road and it became the A1 in 1923. Subsequent upgrades during the 1960s saw this section of the road become a dual carriageway which effectively split the hamlet and isolated the larger part of Beeston from Sandy, pedestrian access being limited to a footbridge. Plans are afoot to reposition the road to bypass Beeston/Sandy but no date for this work has been set.

Historically the main occupation of the residents of Beeston was market gardening, farming and straw plaiting (woman & girls) for the hat industry.

Beeston is in the Anglican Parish of St Swithun, Sandy. It has a Wesleyan (Methodist) Chapel built 1865 with seating for 300. A former chapel on Beeston Green is now a private home.

The major feature of Beeston is the 13-acre (53,000 m^{2}) village green bounded by many of the older residences.
