= The Lodge RSPB reserve =

RSPB nature reserve in Bedfordshire, England

RSPB The Lodge
- Sandy Lodge, Sandy Warren
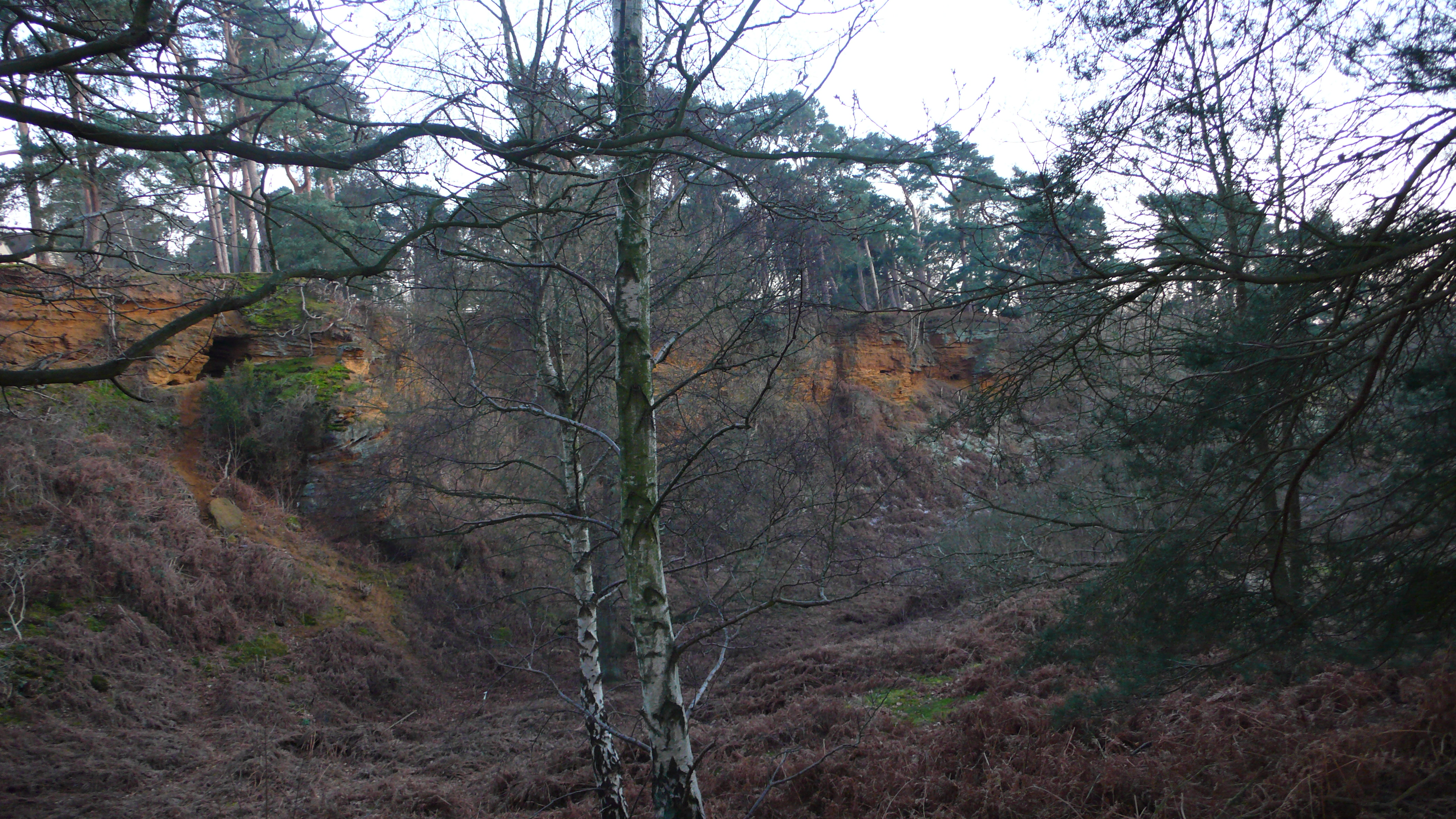
- Woodland at Sandy Quarry, The Lodge
- Interactive map of RSPB The Lodge
- Location: Sandy, Bedfordshire, England
- Area: 220 hectares (540 acres)
- Created: 1961

RSPB The Lodge is a nature reserve run by the Royal Society for the Protection of Birds (RSPB), named after the building there, The Lodge, which is the organisation's headquarters. It is located south-east of the town of Sandy, Bedfordshire, in England.

== Reserve ==
The reserve sits on the Greensand Ridge, overlooking the River Ivel valley and includes areas of broadleaved and coniferous woodland, acid grassland and heathland. The area surrounding The Lodge was covered in heathland prior to the 19th century, when it was ploughed up for agriculture or planted with non-native conifer species for forestry.

In 2005, work began to restore some areas of heathland. The aim is to attract species including woodlark Lullula arborea, European nightjar Caprimulgus europaeus, and Dartford warbler Sylvia undata. Sandy Warren, part of the reserve, is designated a Site of Special Scientific Interest.

== History ==
The Lodge
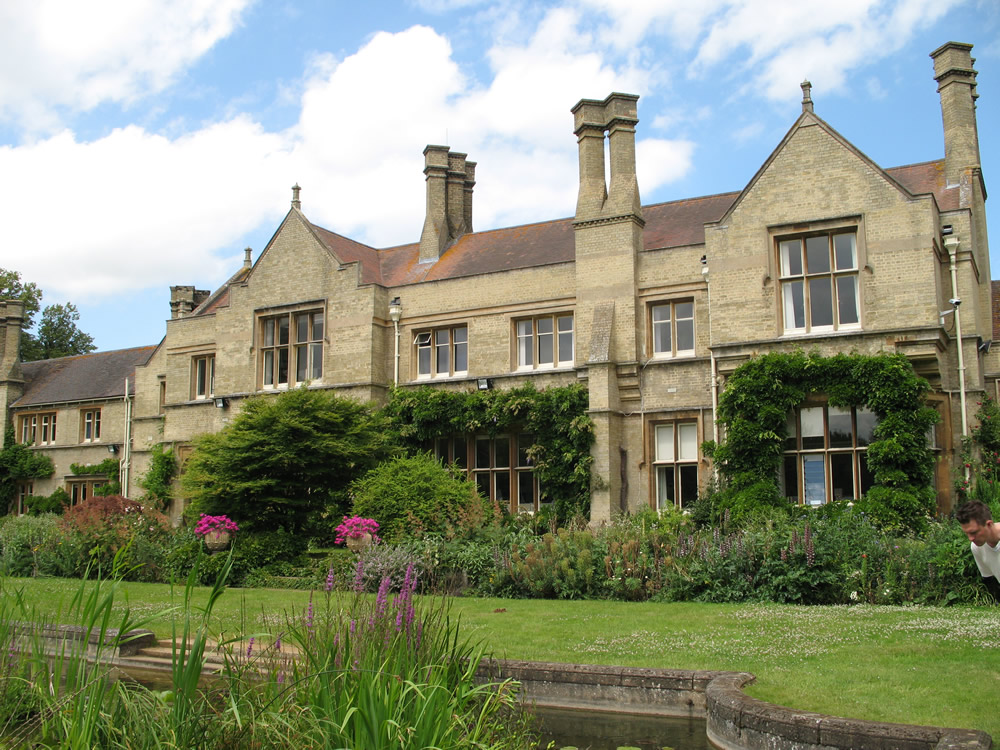
- The Lodge house viewed from the formal gardens, with old swimming pool in foreground

- Location within Bedfordshire
- Former names: Sandy Lodge

General information
- Location: Sandy, Bedfordshire, England
- Coordinates: 52.1161°N 0.2653°W

The site has two Iron Age hill forts, built about 700 BC; the more impressive, on Galley Hill, is a univallate fort, with obvious banks and ditches. 'Sandy Warren' later became a valuable source of rabbits for food.

Around 1851, the 'Swiss Cottage' (which now serves as the reserve's visitor centre and shop) was built for Captain William Peel. When he died, the estate passed to his mother, and then to his younger brother Arthur Wellesley Peel, MP and Speaker of the House of Commons, who built the current house, originally known as 'Sandy Lodge', in 1870. After Peel died in 1912 it was let for about ten years to Harriet Farley, widow of Reuben Farley, who immersed herself in the local community, until Peel's son Sidney Peel returned to live there. In 1934 the house was sold to Sir Malcolm Stewart and the formal gardens were established.

After Princess Margaret decided not to buy The Lodge (having been advised that a public bridleway through the grounds was a security risk), the RSPB acquired it in 1961, along with 42 hectares (100 acres) of land. The purchase was arranged by Tony Norris, then chairman of its finance and general purposes committee, who used his own money to facilitate the transaction and was, for one day, owner of the Lodge. It has been their headquarters ever since.

On 13 October 2010, an unexploded bomb from World War II was safely removed from the grounds.

The grounds now run to 220 hectares (540 acres).
