= The Riddy =

Nature reserve in Bedfordshire, England

Coordinates: 52.1247°N 0.2960°W

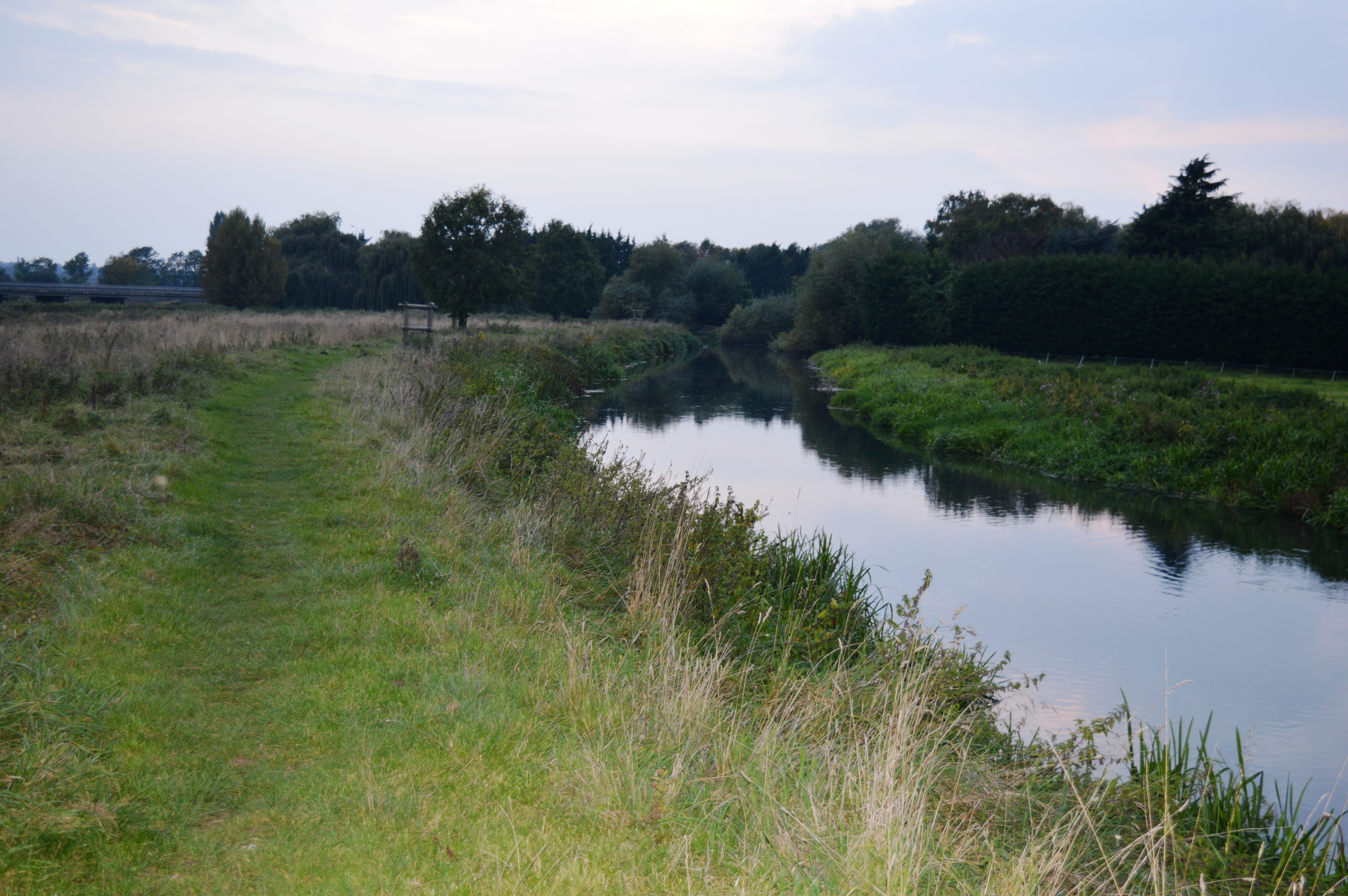
The Riddy and the River Ivel

The Riddy is an 8.4 hectare flood meadow and Local Nature Reserve located in Sandy, Bedfordshire, United Kingdom, bordering the River Ivel. Owned by Sandy Town Council but managed by both the Wildlife Trust for Bedfordshire, Cambridgeshire and Northamptonshire and Bedfordshire Rural Communities Charity, the 7.7 hectares (19 acres) site gains its name from a small stream which flows through the eastern end of the reserve. The different habitats in the Riddy support a diverse range of species, including a multiplicity of grasses and flowering plants in the meadows, aquatic plants and water voles which inhabit the ditches, ponds and stream, and birds which feed and hunt across the reserve.

The Riddy is currently open to the general public; although some of the paths are reasonably rough, the site is most accessible via the riverside path: a disabled access gate is provided as well. The River Ivel may be fished from the reserve border, but a permit from the town council and national rod licence are required.

== History ==
The River Ivel used to be bordered by a number of flood meadows, many of which have now been lost: The Riddy is a remnant of this previous network. In the thirteenth century CE, the area now known as The Riddy was referred to as "Parkesriding". In the north-eastern corner of the reserve, a mill pool can be found; whilst the last mill was built here in 1857, evidence shows that mills have been built on the Riddy since at least Norman times.

== Local Nature Reserve ==
Declared a Local Nature Reserve in 2006 by Sandy Town Council and designated an 'Urban Fringe' site, The Riddy is a species rich habitat, being described by the Wildlife Trust for Bedfordshire, Cambridgeshire and Northamptonshire as "an oasis of wild flowers, bird song and a wonderful view among a sea of arable fields". In the meadows many different grasses and other plants grow, such as cuckoo flower (Cardamine pratensis). The pond, stream and ditches support aquatic plants, such as arrowhead (Sagittaria sagittifolia), celery-leaved buttercup (Ranunculus sceleratus), purple-loosestrife (Lythrum salicaria), water-plantain (Alisma plantago-aquatica) and duckweed. Chub (Squalius cephalus) and carp can both be found in the 500 yards (460 m) stream, along with the nationally protected water vole (Arvicola amphibius). Numerous birds frequent The Riddy, some which feed in the meadows including redwing (Turdus iliacus), fieldfare (Turdus pilaris) and northern lapwing (Vanellus vanellus), whilst sparrowhawks (Accipiter nisus) have been observed "patrolling" the mature hedgerows. Grey herons (Ardea cinerea) and common terns (Sterna hirundo) hunt fish, and in the autumn, song thrushes (Turdus philomelos) can be seen at the reserve. Grey wagtail (Motacilla cinerea) and kingfisher (Alcedo atthis) have also been recorded on the reserve.

The reserve is managed by both the Wildlife Trust for Bedfordshire, Cambridgeshire and Northamptonshire and Bedfordshire Rural Communities Charity through its volunteer group 'Ivel Valley Conservation Volunteers'. Management tasks performed on The Riddy include the coppicing of the willows in the small osier bed which stimulates new growth, grazing with cattle to remove each season's growth and to maintain the grassland habitats, along with the removal ('pulling') of ragwort (Jacobaea vulgaris) which is poisonous to certain animals, notably the grazing cattle, when ingested.
