= Sandy Warren =

UK nature reserve

Coordinates: 52.117938°N 0.261222°W

- Site of Special Scientific Interest
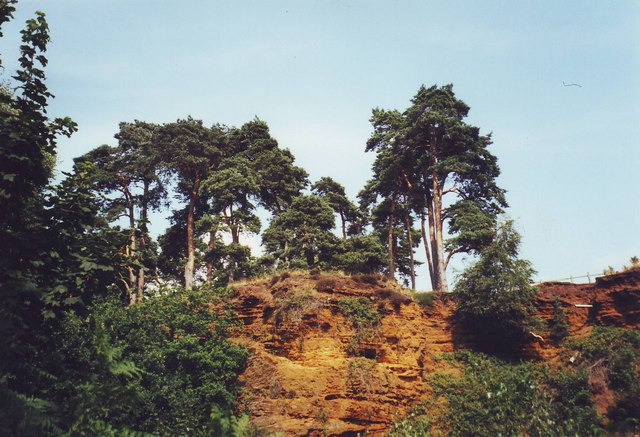
- Location of Sandy Warren.
- Area of search: Bedfordshire
- Grid reference: TL198478
- Interest: Biological
- Area: 16.4 ha (41 acres)
- Notification date: 1986
- Location map: Magic Map

Sandy Warren is a 16.4-hectare (41-acre) biological Site of Special Scientific Interest near the town of Sandy in Bedfordshire. It is part of The Lodge, a nature reserve run by the Royal Society for the Protection of Birds (RSPB), and named after the RSPB headquarters called The Lodge at the same site.

The site is of lowland heath, which is rare in south east England. It is on the acidic soil of the Lower Greensand ridge. It also has areas of unimproved grassland and birch woodland. Dragonflies breed in artificial pools, and the site is also noted for many fungi and bird species. Additional habitats are damp areas and seasonal pools, which have some uncommon species such as distant sedge and carnation sedge. The RSPB is felling conifers to create additional areas of heath.

There is a network of footpaths from the RSPB headquarters off Potton Road.
