= Sandy, Bedfordshire =

Market town and civil parish in Central Bedfordshire, England

Coordinates: 52.131°N 0.297°W

Sandy
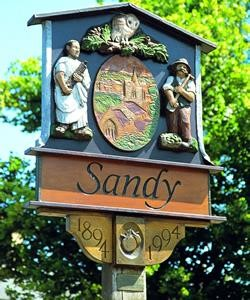
- The town sign in Sandy

- Location within Bedfordshire
- Population: 12,171 (Parish, 2021); 11,375 (Built up area, 2021)
- OS grid reference: TL1649
  - London: 43 miles (69 km) S
- Civil parish: Sandy
- Unitary authority: Central Bedfordshire
- Ceremonial county: Bedfordshire
- Region: East
- Country: England
- Sovereign state: United Kingdom
- Post town: SANDY
- Postcode district: SG19
- Dialling code: 01767
- Police: Bedfordshire
- Fire: Bedfordshire
- Ambulance: East of England
- UK Parliament: North Bedfordshire

Sandy is a town and civil parish in Central Bedfordshire, England. It lies 8 miles (13 km) to the east of Bedford, 18 miles (29 km) to the south west of Cambridge and 43 miles (69 km) north of Central London. It had a population of 12,171 at the 2021 census.

The town takes its name from a low range of sandy hills on the eastern side of the town, which form part of the Bedfordshire Greensand Ridge. The main part of the built-up area lies between the hills to the east and the River Ivel to the west. The A1 road skirts the western edge of the town. Sandy railway station is on the Great Northern route between London and Peterborough, with the railway running along the eastern edge of the built-up area. The parish also includes the hamlet of Beeston, which straddles the A1 to the south-west of the town.

The headquarters of the Royal Society for the Protection of Birds (RSPB) is at The Lodge at Sandy Warren in the hills to the east of the town, where it has been based since 1961.

== History ==
The Sandy area has a long history of occupation, with evidence found for settlement prior to 250 BC. Sandy was a Roman settlement, when it was probably an important trading centre and staging post. An ancient hill fort, now heavily wooded and traditionally known as Caesar's Camp, although more commonly called "the sand hills" or "the lookout", still overlooks the town.

Sandy is referred to in the Domesday Book of 1086, as Sandeia, a derivation from the Old English Sandieg, meaning a sand-island. At that time it was part of the ancient hundred of Weneslawe and was held by Eudo Fitzhubert, who is likely to have been the tenant. He was probably also known as Eudo Dapifer, who was a high steward for William the Conqueror, and based in Colchester Castle.

There were two mills listed in Sandy in the Domesday Book, which would have been water-powered. One of these mills is likely to have been at Sandy Mill on the River Ivel to the south-west of the town. This was at the end of Mill Lane, adjoining The Riddy, which is now a local nature reserve. There was a water mill on this site from at least the Norman era. The last mill on the site was built in 1857. Milling continued into the twentieth century, with the last mill buildings eventually being demolished in 1977 and replaced with housing. Further down the river from the mill it is believed there was a Danish camp which was built to protect the Danelaw in 886.

The half-hundred of Weneslawe contained Sandy and 3 additional parishes during the Domesday survey; before Kirby's Quest (1284–86) this half-hundred was merged into the Hundred of Biggleswade. In 1831 the old Weneslawe parishes were listed as Sandy, Sutton, Potton, Hatley, and additionally Everton. A route for a scenic and historic Weneslawe Walk around Sandy, Potton, and Biggleswade was promoted in 2022.

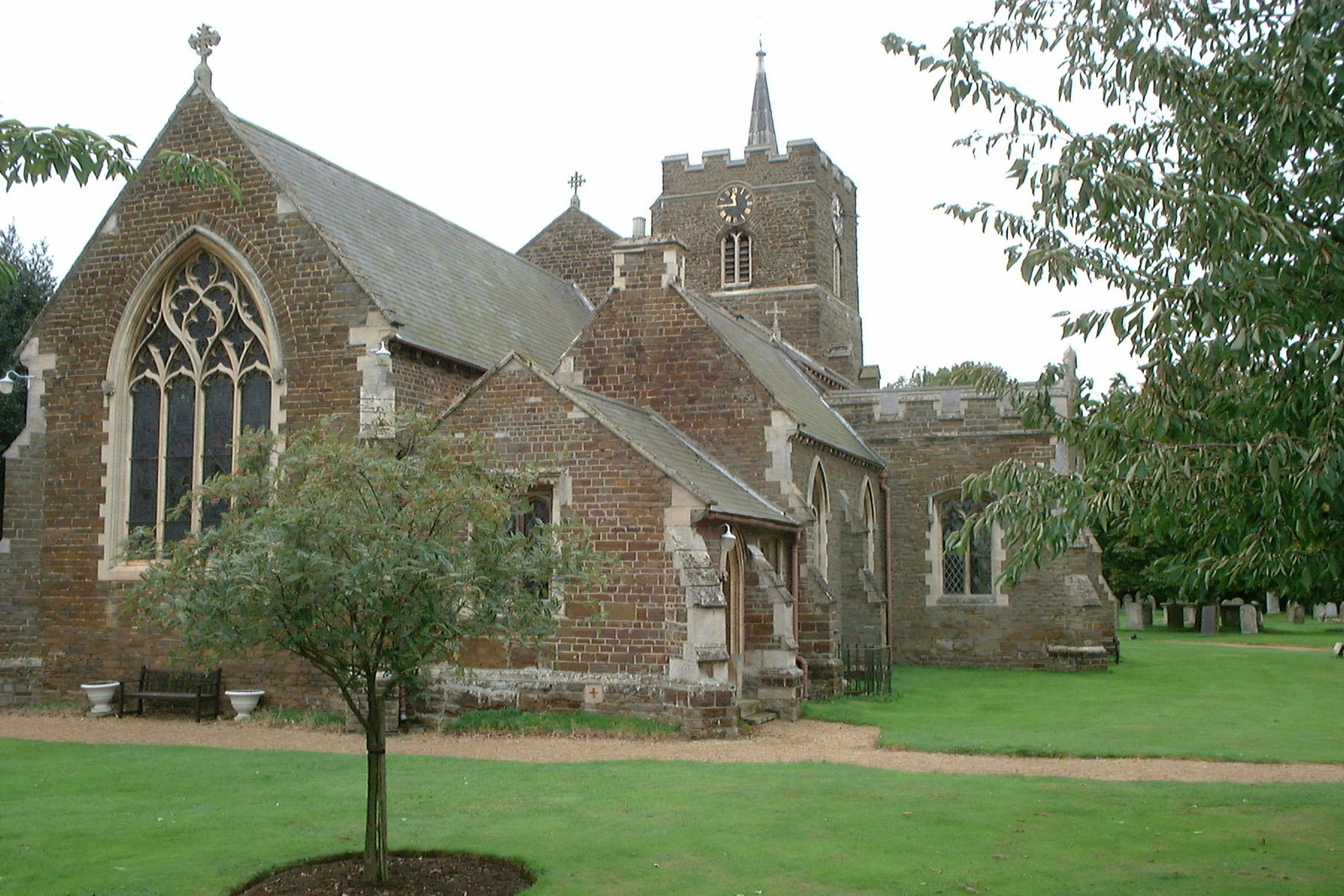
St Swithun's Church, High Street

Sandy's parish church of St Swithun was largely rebuilt in 1860, but retaining some of the medieval building, including the tower.

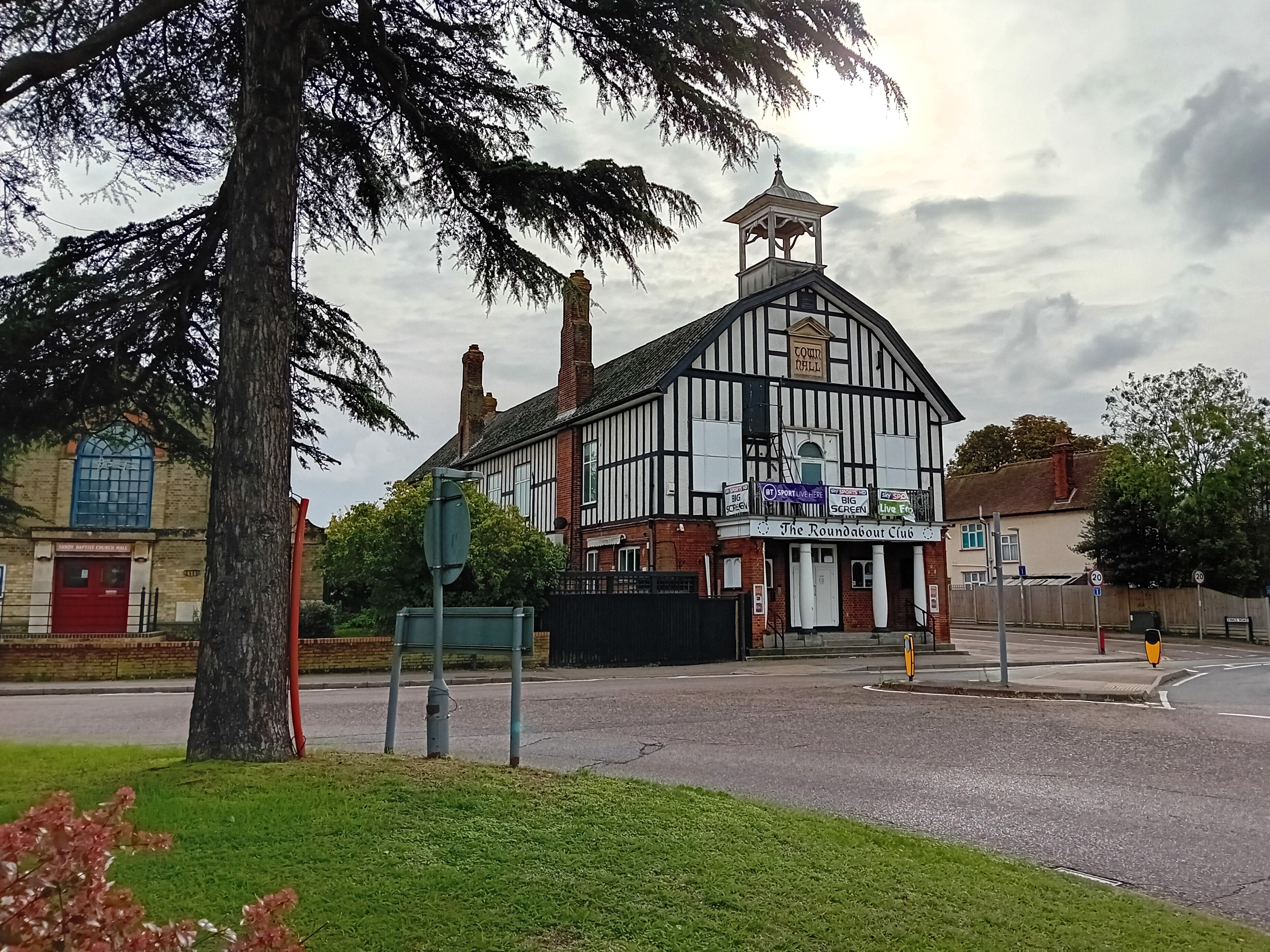
Former Town Hall, Bedford Road, now The Roundabout Club

Sandy remained a village into the twentieth century. The central public space is called Market Square, but Sandy was not a market town as such; it was not until 1925 that it was formally given the right to hold a market. Sandy Town Hall was built in 1906 on Bedford Road. This was a large hall built by a private company for public events rather than a being a town hall in the sense of a council's headquarters.

The town expanded rapidly in the 1970s with the development of London overspill housing between Sunderland Road and St Neots Road. This expansion continued into the 1990s with new housing developments at Fallow Field and Ivel Park.

== Governance ==
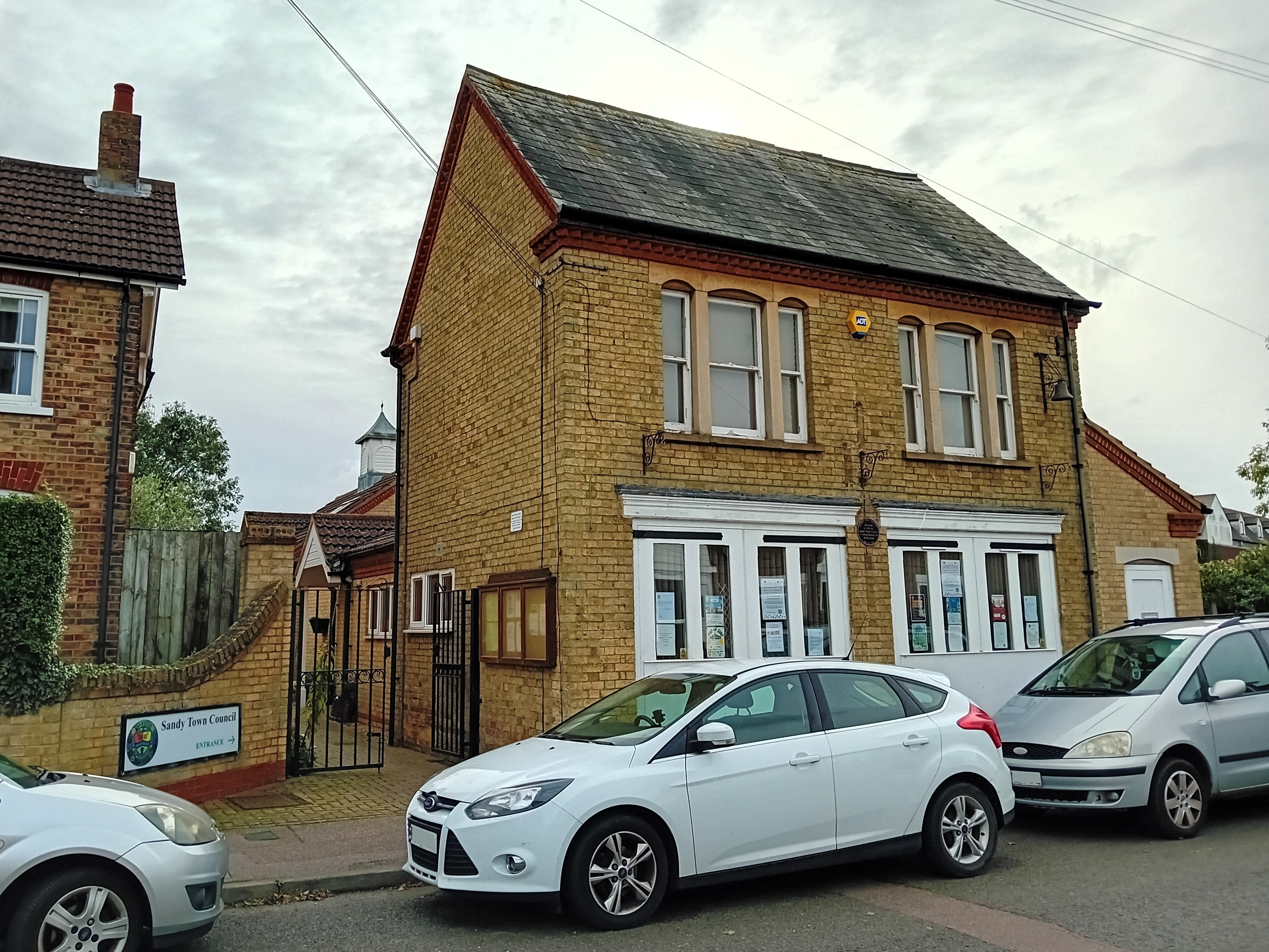
10 Cambridge Road: Former fire station, built 1882. Town Council's headquarters since 1978.

There are two tiers of local government covering Sandy, at parish (town) and unitary authority level: Sandy Town Council and Central Bedfordshire Council. The town council is based at 10 Cambridge Road.

=== Administrative history ===
Sandy was an ancient parish. When elected parish and district councils were established in 1894, Sandy was given a parish council and included in the wider Biggleswade Rural District. In 1895 Sandy Parish Council established a council chamber in a room at the fire station at 10 Cambridge Road, which had been built in 1882.

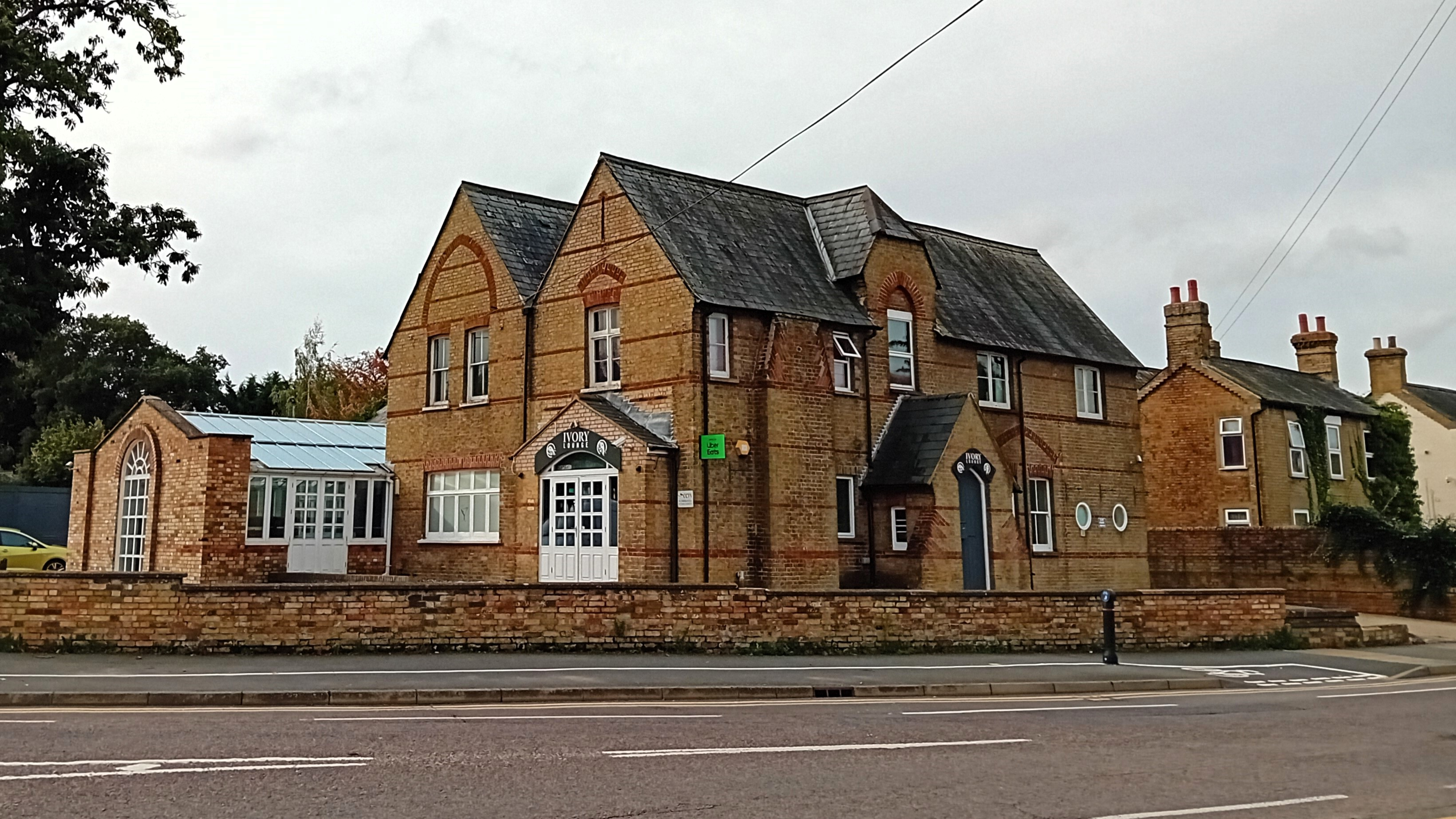
Boyne House, 7 St Neots Road: Council headquarters 1946–1978

In 1927 the parish of Sandy was made an urban district, making it independent from the Biggleswade Rural District. The urban district council continued to meet at the fire station until 1946, when it bought Boyne House at 7 St Neots Road and converted it to become its offices and meeting place.

Sandy Urban District was abolished in 1974 to become part of Mid Bedfordshire. A successor parish was created covering the former urban district. The re-established parish council declared the parish to be a town, allowing it to take the style "town council" and appoint a mayor. In 1978 the town council left Boyne House and returned to 10 Cambridge Road, this time taking over the whole building; the fire station had moved to a new building on Ivel Road in 1954. Mid Bedfordshire in turn was abolished in 2009 to become part of Central Bedfordshire.

=== Constituency ===
Sandy is within the parliamentary constituency of North Bedfordshire.

== Geography ==
Sandy is 43 miles (69 km) north of Central London with the county town of Bedford 8 miles (13 km) to the west. St Neots, Cambridgeshire lies 7 miles (11 km) to the north with Biggleswade 3 miles (4.8 km) to the south.

The River Ivel, a tributary of the River Great Ouse, runs through the town. Parts of the town and adjoining land are designated as a Flood Warning Area. The Greensand Ridge, an escarpment which runs through Buckinghamshire, Bedfordshire, and Cambridgeshire, runs to the south and east of the town.

The Sandy Heath transmitting station, a 244-metre-tall (801 ft) television broadcast mast, is located to the east of the town.

=== Civil parish ===
In addition to the town of Sandy (including Girtford), the parish includes the village of Beeston and the hamlets of Seddington and Stratford.

== Transport ==
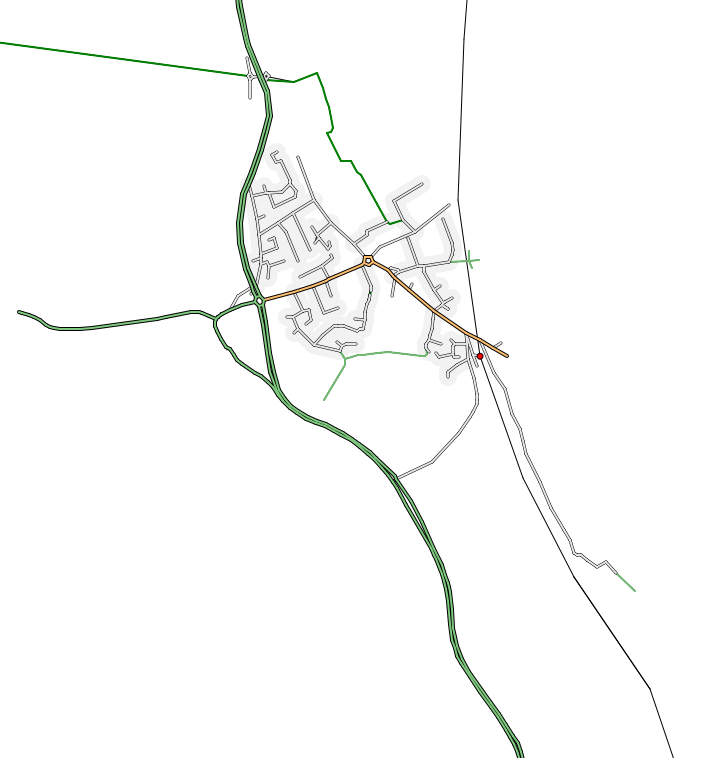
Roads layout in Sandy (partial)

=== Road ===
The A1 London - Edinburgh road hugs the western edge of the town and meets the A603 and B1042 roads at a roundabout (former traffic lights before the late 1970s). The A603 leads west towards Bedford; the B1042 (former A603) passes through the town centre and heads east towards Potton and Cambridge.

The former route of the A1 did not go through the centre of Sandy but passed through Girtford on the west side of the town, crossing the Ivel at Girtford Bridge. The A1 bypass was one of the earlier 1950s improvements on the Great North Road. The bypass required a new bridge over the River Ivel, built by Dorman Long. There were three separate bypass schemes – the improvement from Sandy to the junction with A428 (Tempsford and Tempsford Bridge Diversions, began December 1957 and finished around 1960); provision of second carriageway (widening) through Girtford (began 2 January 1961, finished around October 1962); and Biggleswade by-pass to Girtford (Girtford Diversion, which opened on 6 August 1961 which included pulverised fuel ash as an embankment infill material). The Girtford Underpass was built in the early 1990s by Kimbell Construction, at the former Varsity Line railway bridge.

South of the Sandy roundabout the A1 still follows its historic route through the hamlets of Beeston and Seddington, both in the parish of Sandy. Proposals have been put forward at various times for a bypass, but none have come to fruition.

=== Rail ===
Sandy railway station is located on the East Coast Main Line and provides half-hourly trains south to central London and beyond to Horsham, and north to Peterborough. Journey times to London are typically around 40 minutes. The station is managed and served by Thameslink and Great Northern.

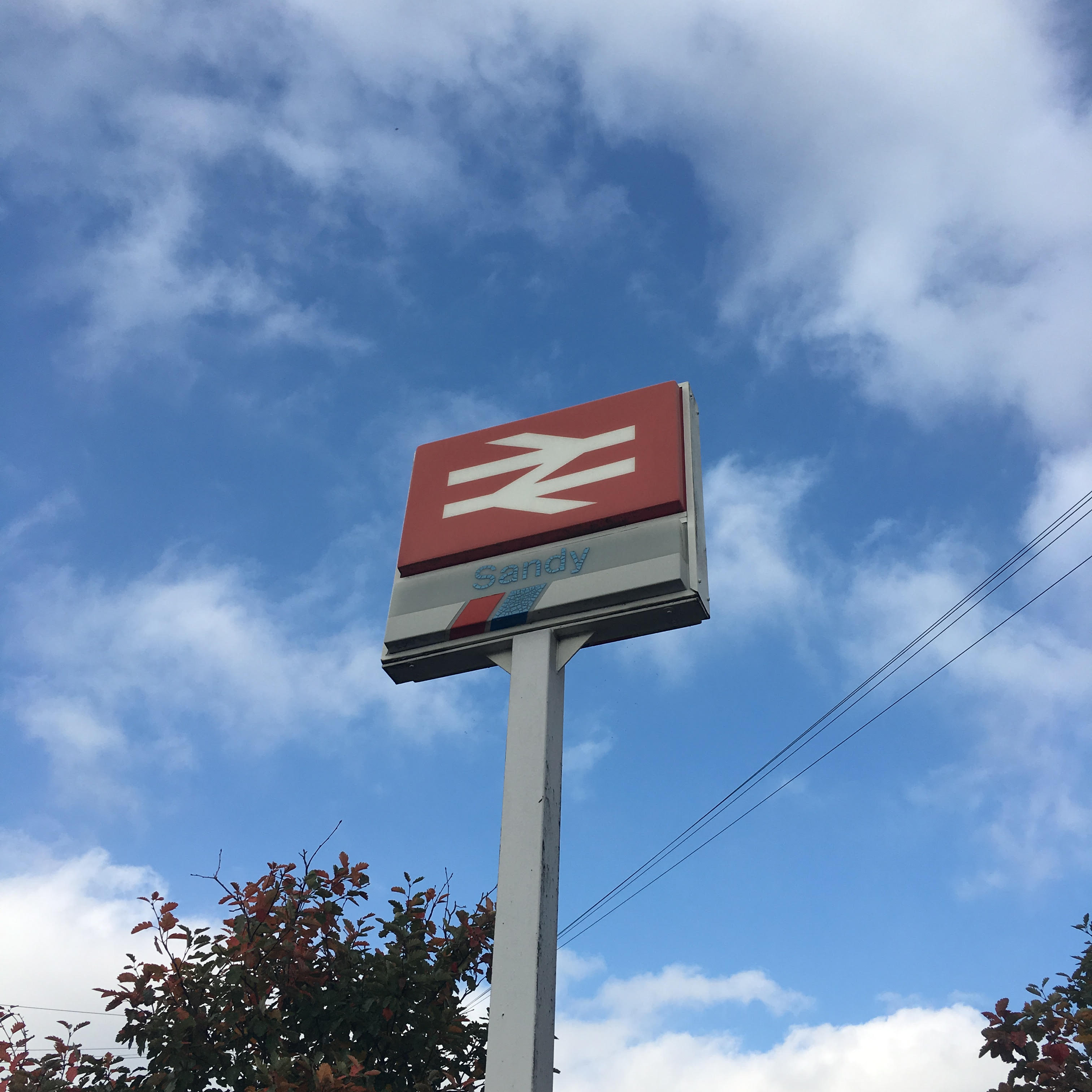
National Rail signpost at Sandy Railway Station.

==== Past and future rail links ====
The Varsity Line, which connected Oxford to Cambridge, ran through Sandy until 1967. Girtford Halt was a short-lived station on the Varsity Line in the Girtford area of the town between 1938 and 1940. From Bedford to Sandy, the line has been paved over and is now part of the NCR 51 cycle route.

In January 2020, East West Rail Ltd, which exists to re-establish the Oxford–Cambridge rail link, announced a new route between Bedford and Cambridge that will bypass Sandy, with a new station 'in the Tempsford area'.

=== Bus ===
The no.73 Stagecoach East bus service, runs half-hourly Monday - Saturday between Biggleswade, Sandy and Bedford. No Sunday service.

== Sport and leisure ==
Sandy has an amateur football team, Sandy F.C., who compete in Division three of the Cambridge county football league

An athletics track, located at Sandy Secondary School, is home to Biggleswade Athletic Club.

== Media ==
Local news and television programmes are provided by BBC East and ITV Anglia. Television signals are received from the nearby Sandy Heath TV transmitter.

Sandy's local radio stations are BBC Three Counties Radio on 95.5 FM, Heart East on 96.9 FM and BigglesFM is a licensed community radio station transmitting from nearby Potton on 104.8 FM and online. Full-time broadcasting began in April 2011.

The town is served by the local newspaper, The Biggleswade Chronicle.

== Education ==
Schools in Sandy were previously 3 tier (lower, middle and upper) as per the rest of the schools in Central Bedfordshire. However, from 2018 schools in the town have converted to being 2 tier (primary and secondary). Due to these changes Sandye Place Academy (the middle school in Sandy) closed in September 2019.

=== Primary schools ===
- Laburnum Primary school
- Maple Tree Primary School
- Robert Peel Primary School
- St Swithun's CE Primary School

=== Secondary schools ===
- Sandy Secondary School

== Notable people ==
- Ben Tuck (born 1997), racing driver

== Twinned towns ==
Sandy has been twinned with the town of Malaunay in France since 1982, as a result of which the Sandy Twinning Association was also established. The association has also recently developed links with the town of Skarszewy in Poland.

== Commemoration ==
Frederick Thomas Bidlake is commemorated by a garden and monument, at Girtford Bridge. It was unveiled on 23 September 1934 as more than 4,000 watched W. P. Cook, president of the Anfield Bicycle Club and the Road Records Association, perform the unveiling ceremony. The rector of Sandy blessed the memorial. The garden is triangular with a wall of local stone on one side. In its centre, a stone reads: "This garden is dedicated to Frederick Thomas Bidlake, a great cyclist, a man of singular charm and character, an untiring worker for cyclists 1867–1933". A sundial in the centre of the garden is marked "He measured time". A facsimile milestone is engraved "F. T. B. Few have known this road as he. London 48 – York 148".

Girtford Bridge itself was built in 1780–82 to the designs of the Rutland architect John Wing (1728–1794) assisted by his son John Wing (1756–1826)

There is a statue of Victoria Cross recipient William Peel in the south transept of St Swithun's Church. Opposite the church across the High Street stands the Sir William Peel public house (known as the Lord Nelson until 1994).
