= 2027 Test Valley Borough Council election =

2027 English local government election

- 6 May 2027

All 43 seats to Test Valley Borough Council 22 seats needed for a majority
Leader	Phil North	Neil Gwynne
Party	Conservative	Liberal Democrats	Independent
Leader's seat	Bourne Valley	Romsey Cupernham
Last election	26 seats, 39.6%	17 seats, 42.4%	0 seats, 6.0%
Current seats	25	16	2
Incumbent Leader
Phil North
Conservative

The 2027 Test Valley Borough Council election will be held on 6 May 2027 to elect members of Test Valley Borough Council in Hampshire, England. This will be on the same day as other local elections held across the United Kingdom.

== Background ==
=== Local government reorganisation ===
Due to proposed structural changes to local government in England, the 2023 election would have been the final election to the council before it was abolished and replaced by Mid Hampshire Council and South West Hampshire Council, two new unitary authorities.

However, on 7 September 2026, the government announced it was withdrawing plans for the planned restructuring pending review. Following this announcement, local elections due to be held in 2027 under the existing local electoral calendar would proceed.

== Summary ==
=== Election result ===
2027 Test Valley Borough Council election
Party	Candidates	Seats	Gains	Losses	Net gain/loss	Seats %	Votes %	Votes	+/−
Conservative		25 (Note: Current seats.)							
Liberal Democrats		16							
Independent		2							
