= 2027 Luton Borough Council election =

2027 English local government election

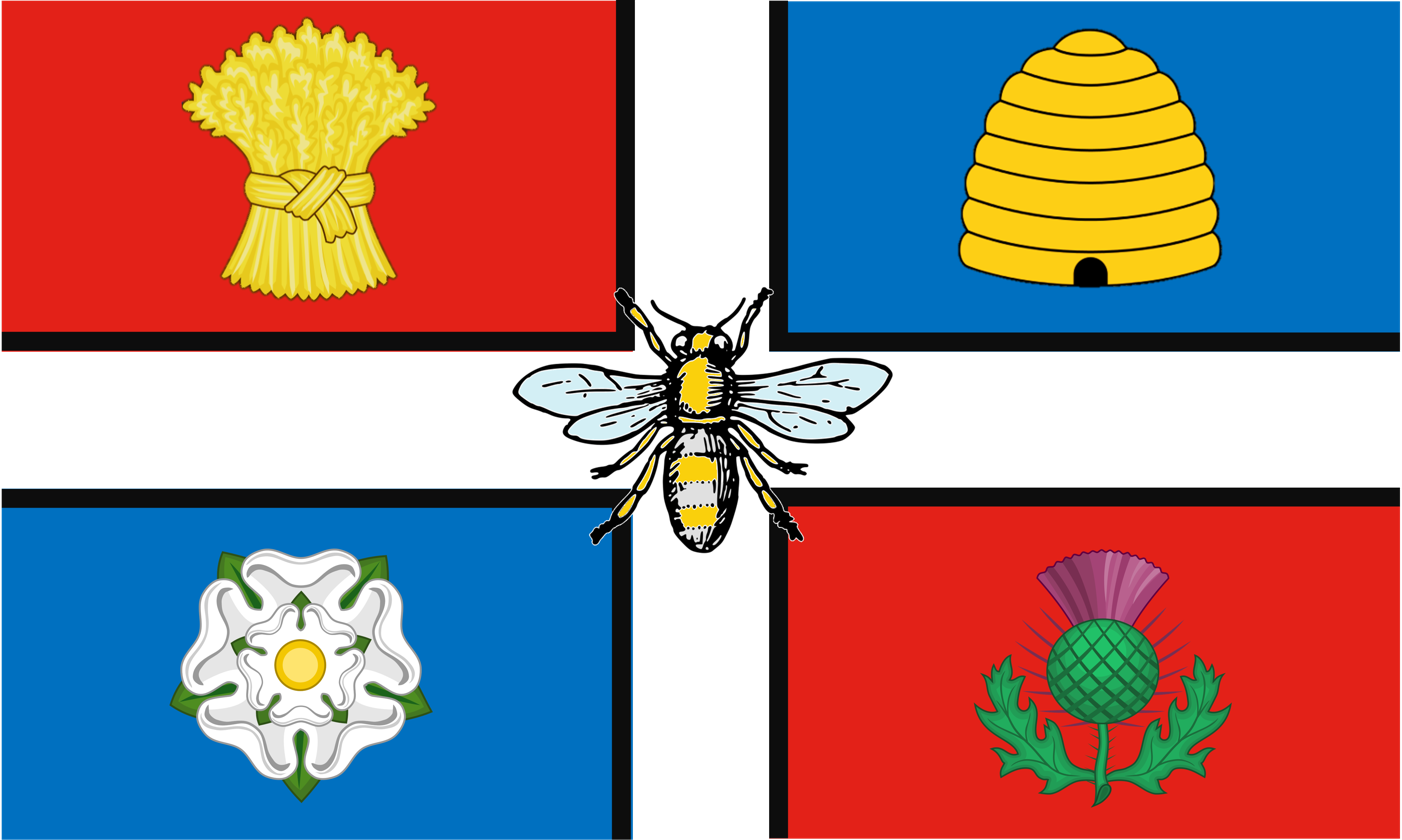
- 6 May 2027

All 48 seats to Luton Borough Council 25 seats needed for a majority
Leader	Tahmina Saleem	Amjid Ali	Rob Roche (Note: Leader of the Independent Alliance group.)
Party	Labour	Liberal Democrats	Independent
Leader's seat	Biscot	Barnfield	Northwell
Last election	30 seats, 48.7%	15 seats, 35.6%	0 seats, 4.3%
Current seats	21	13	10 (Note: Of the 10 Independent councillors sitting prior to the election, 7 sat in the Independent Alliance group and 3 were non-aligned.)
Leader	Aslam Khan	James Fletcher
Party	Conservative	Reform
Leader's seat	Poets	Wigmore
Last election	3 seats, 10.1%	0 seats, 1.2%
Current seats	3	1
Incumbent Leader
Amjid Ali
Liberal Democrats
No overall control (Note: Liberal Democrats–Independent–Conservative coalition.)

The 2027 Luton Borough Council election will be held on 6 May 2027 to elect members of Luton Borough Council in Bedfordshire, England. This will be on the same day as other local elections held across the United Kingdom.

== Summary ==
=== Election result ===
2027 Luton Borough Council election
Party	Candidates	Seats	Gains	Losses	Net gain/loss	Seats %	Votes %	Votes	+/−
Labour		21 (Note: Current seats.)							
Liberal Democrats		13							
Independent		10							
Conservative		3							
Reform		1							
