= 2027 Crawley Borough Council election =

2027 English local government election

- 6 May 2027

12 out of 36 seats to Crawley Borough Council 19 seats needed for a majority
Leader	Michael Jones	Tim Charters	Duncan Crow
Party	Labour	Reform	Conservative
Leader's seat	Bewbush & North Broadfield	Southgate	Furnace Green
Last election	21 seats, 24.7%	11 seats, 33.4%	4 seats, 20.8%
Current seats	21	11	4
Incumbent Leader
Michael Jones
Labour

The 2027 Crawley Borough Council election will be held on 6 May 2027 to elect members of Crawley Borough Council in West Sussex, England. This will be on the same day as other local elections held across the United Kingdom.

== Background ==
=== Local government reorganisation ===
Due to proposed structural changes to local government in England, the 2026 election was intended to be the final election to the council before it was abolished and replaced by a new unitary authority, although the structure of this new authority was yet to be decided. However, on 7 September 2026, the government announced it was withdrawing plans for the planned restructuring pending review. Following this announcement, local elections due to be held in 2027 under the existing local electoral calendar would proceed.

== Summary ==
=== Election result ===
2027 Crawley Borough Council election
Party	This election				Full council			This election		
Party	Candidates	Seats	Net	Seats %	Other	Total	Total %	Votes	Votes %	+/−
Labour					12					
Reform					10					
Conservative					2					

=== Incumbents ===
Ward	Incumbent councillor	Affiliation	Re-standing
Bewbush & North Broadfield	Marion Ayling	Labour	
Broadfield	Ian Irvine	Labour	
Furnace Green	Duncan Crow	Conservative	
Gossops Green & North East Broadfield	Chris Mullins	Labour	
Ifield	Julian Charatan	Labour	
Langley Green & Tushmore	Imran Ashraf	Labour	
Maidenbower	Kim Jaggard	Conservative	
Northgate & West Green	Khayle Abu Mosa	Labour	
Pound Hill North & Forge Wood	Justin Russell	Labour	
Pound Hill South & Worth	Craig Burke	Reform	
Southgate	Bob Noyce	Labour	
Three Bridges	Mandie Hains	Labour	
