= 2027 East Hampshire District Council election =

2027 English local government election

- 6 May 2027

All 43 seats to East Hampshire District Council 22 seats needed for a majority
Leader	Richard Millard	Emily Young	Andy Tree
Party	Conservative	Liberal Democrats	WBCP
Leader's seat	Headley	Alton Westbrooke	Whitehill Chase
Last election	19 seats, 43.5%	14 seats, 32.2%	6 seats, 7.3%
Current seats	18	14	6
Leader		James Hogan	Barbara Tansey
Party	Independent	Green	Labour
Leader's seat		Horndean Downs	Alton Eastbrooke
Last election	1 seat, 0.9%	2 seats, 6.5%	1 seat, 9.2%
Current seats	3	1	1
Incumbent Leader
Richard Millard
Conservative
No overall control (Note: Conservative–WBCP coalition.)

The 2027 East Hampshire District Council election will be held on 6 May 2027 to elect members of East Hampshire District Council in Hampshire, England. This will be on the same day as other local elections held across the United Kingdom.

== Background ==
=== Local government reorganisation ===
Due to proposed structural changes to local government in England, the 2023 election would have been the final election to the council before it was abolished and replaced by Mid Hampshire Council and South East Hampshire Council, two new unitary authorities.

However, on 7 September 2026, the government announced it was withdrawing plans for the planned restructuring pending review. Following this announcement, local elections due to be held in 2027 under the existing local electoral calendar would proceed.

== Summary ==
=== Election result ===
2027 East Hampshire District Council election
Party	Candidates	Seats	Gains	Losses	Net gain/loss	Seats %	Votes %	Votes	+/−
Conservative		18 (Note: Current seats.)							
Liberal Democrats		14							
WBCP		6							
Independent		3							
Green		1							
Labour		1							
