= 2027 West Suffolk District Council election =

2027 English local government election

- 6 May 2027

All 64 seats to West Suffolk District Council 33 seats needed for a majority
Leader	Beccy Hopfensperger	(Note: Victor Lukaniuk is the leader of the Independents group. Tony Brown is the leader of the Spectrum group.)	David Smith (Note: Leader of the Progressive Alliance group.)
Party	Conservative	Independent	Labour
Leader's seat	The Fornhams & Great Barton	(Note: Victor Lukaniuk is a sitting councillor for Brandon West ward. Tony Brown is a sitting councillor for Haverhill South East ward.)	Haverhill South
Last election	26 seats, 44.1%	19 seats, 17.2% (Note: Combined seat totals and vote share for both Independent and West Suffolk Independent candidates.)	17 seats, 30.4%
Current seats	24	19 (Note: Of the 19 Independent councillors sitting before the election, 16 sat in the Independents group and 3 sat in the Spectrum group. All councillors elected as West Suffolk Independents at the 2023 election are listed as Independents on the council's website.)	15 (Note: The 15 Labour councillors sit in the Progressive Alliance group.)
Leader	Adrian Whittle	David Smith	David Smith
Party	Reform	Green	Liberal Democrats
Leader's seat	Newmarket East	Haverhill South	Haverhill South
Last election	0 seats, 0.9%	1 seat, 4.2%	1 seat, 3.0%
Current seats	3	2 (Note: The 2 Green councillors sit in the Progressive Alliance group.)	1 (Note: The sole Liberal Democrats councillor sits in the Progressive Alliance group.)
Incumbent Leader
Cliff Waterman
Labour
No overall control (Note: Independent–Labour–Green–Liberal Democrats coalition.)

The 2027 West Suffolk District Council election will be held on 6 May 2027 to elect members of West Suffolk District Council in Suffolk, England. This will be on the same day as other local elections held across the United Kingdom.

== Background ==
=== Local government reorganisation ===
Due to proposed structural changes to local government in England, the 2023 election would have been the final election to the council before it was abolished and replaced by an expanded West Suffolk Council, a unitary authority. However, on 7 September 2026, the government announced it was withdrawing plans for the planned restructuring pending review. Following this announcement, local elections due to be held in 2027 under the existing local electoral calendar would proceed.

== Summary ==
=== Election result ===
2027 West Suffolk District Council election
Party	Candidates	Seats	Gains	Losses	Net gain/loss	Seats %	Votes %	Votes	+/−
Conservative		24 (Note: Current seats.)							
Independent		19							
Labour		15							
Reform		3							
Green		2							
Liberal Democrats		1							
