= 2027 Folkestone and Hythe District Council election =

2027 English local government election

2027 Folkestone & Hythe District Council election
- 6 May 2027

All 30 seats to Folkestone & Hythe District Council 16 seats needed for a majority
Leader	Jim Martin	Adrian Lockwood	Jennifer Hollingsbee
Party	Green	Labour	Conservative
Leader's seat	Hythe	East Folkestone	North Downs West
Last election	11 seats, 31.0%	10 seats, 20.9%	5 seats, 27.8%
Current seats	11	8	5
Leader		Tim Platter	David Wimble
Party	Independent	Liberal Democrats	Reform
Leader's seat		Sandgate & West Folkestone	New Romney
Last election	2 seats, 6.4%	2 seats, 11.3%	0 seats, 1.3%
Current seats	3	2	1
Incumbent Leader
Jim Martin
Green
No overall control (Note: Green–Liberal Democrats minority coalition.)

The 2027 Folkestone & Hythe District Council election will be held on 6 May 2027 to elect members of Folkestone & Hythe District Council in Kent, England. This will be on the same day as other local elections held across the United Kingdom.

== Background ==
=== Local government reorganisation ===
Due to proposed structural changes to local government in England, the 2023 election would have been the final election to the council before it was abolished and replaced by Mid Kent Council, a unitary authority. However, on 7 September 2026, the government announced it was withdrawing plans for the planned restructuring pending review. Following this announcement, local elections due to be held in 2027 under the existing local electoral calendar would proceed.

== Summary ==
=== Election result ===
2027 Folkestone & Hythe District Council election
Party	Candidates	Seats	Gains	Losses	Net gain/loss	Seats %	Votes %	Votes	+/−
Green		11 (Note: Current seats.)							
Labour		8							
Conservative		5							
Independent		3							
Liberal Democrats		2							
Reform		1							
