= 2027 Babergh District Council election =

2027 English local government election

- 6 May 2027

All 32 seats to Babergh District Council 17 seats needed for a majority
Leader	Deborah Saw		Margaret Maybury
Party	Green	Independent	Conservative
Leader's seat	North West Cosford		Lavenham
Last election	10 seats, 31.1%	9 seats, 15.9%	7 seats, 24.1%
Current seats	10	9	6
Leader	Lee Parker	Michael Holt	Alison Owen
Party	Liberal Democrats	Reform	Labour
Leader's seat	Assington	Chadacre	Sudbury North East
Last election	5 seats, 15.8%	Did not stand	1 seat, 13.1%
Current seats	4	2	1
Incumbent Leader
Deborah Saw
Green
No overall control (Note: Green–Independent–Liberal Democrats coalition.)

The 2027 Babergh District Council election will be held on 6 May 2027 to elect members of Babergh District Council in Suffolk, England. This will be on the same day as other local elections held across the United Kingdom.

== Background ==
=== Local government reorganisation ===
Due to proposed structural changes to local government in England, the 2023 election would have been the final election to the council before it was abolished and replaced by Ipswich & South Suffolk Council and West Suffolk Council, both unitary authorities. However, on 7 September 2026, the government announced it was withdrawing plans for the planned restructuring pending review. Following this announcement, local elections due to be held in 2027 under the existing local electoral calendar would proceed.

== Summary ==
=== Election result ===
2027 Babergh District Council election
Party	Candidates	Seats	Gains	Losses	Net gain/loss	Seats %	Votes %	Votes	+/−
Green		10 (Note: Current seats.)							
Independent		9							
Conservative		6							
Liberal Democrats		4							
Reform		2							
Labour		1							
