= 2027 East Hertfordshire District Council election =

2027 English local government election

- 6 May 2027

All 50 seats to East Hertfordshire District Council 26 seats needed for a majority
Leader	Ben Crystall	Aubrey Holt	Mione Goldspink
Party	Green	Conservative	Liberal Democrats
Leader's seat	Hertford Bengeo	The Mundens	Bishop's Stortford North
Last election	19 seats, 28.4%	16 seats, 34.4%	10 seats, 15.7%
Current seats	16 (Note: Includes the vacant seat of Hertford Kingsmead last held by a Green.)	14	10
Leader	David Jacobs		Graham McAndrew
Party	Labour	Independent	Reform
Leader's seat	Bishop's Stortford Central		Bishop's Stortford Thorley Manor
Last election	5 seats, 19.8%	0 seats, 1.4%	0 seats, 0.3%
Current seats	5	3	2
Incumbent Leader
Ben Crystal
Green
No overall control (Note: Green–Liberal Democrats coalition.)

The 2027 East Hertfordshire District Council election will be held on 6 May 2027 to elect members of East Hertfordshire District Council in Hertfordshire, England. This will be on the same day as other local elections held across the United Kingdom.

== Background ==
=== Local government reorganisation ===
Due to proposed structural changes to local government in England, the 2023 election would have been the final election to the council before it was abolished and replaced by East Hertfordshire & Broxbourne Council, a new unitary authority. However, on 7 September 2026, the government announced it was withdrawing plans for the planned restructuring pending review. Following this announcement, local elections due to be held in 2027 under the existing local electoral calendar would proceed.

== Summary ==
=== Election result ===
2027 East Hertfordshire District Council election
Party	Candidates	Seats	Gains	Losses	Net gain/loss	Seats %	Votes %	Votes	+/−
Green		16 (Note: Current seats.)							
Conservative		14							
Liberal Democrats		10							
Labour		5							
Independent		3							
Reform		2							
