= 2027 Rother District Council election =

2027 English local government election

- 6 May 2027

All 38 seats to Rother District Council 20 seats needed for a majority
| Leader | Carl Maynard | Susan Prochak | Gareth Delany |
| Party | Conservative | Liberal Democrats | Labour |
| Leader's seat | Sedlescombe & Wesfield | Robertsbridge | Bexhill Pebsham & St Michaels |
| Last election | 10 seats, 37.5% | 7 seats, 15.7% | 8 seats, 14.2% |
| Current seats | 12 | 9 | 6 |
| Leader | Doug Oliver | Polly Gray |
| Party | RAOIC | Green | Independent |
| Leader's seat | Bexhill Collington | Bexhill Old Town & Worsham |
| Last election | 7 seats, 13.3% | 3 seats, 6.8% | 3 seats, 9.6% |
| Current seats | 6 | 3 | 1 |
| Leader | Daniel Bradley |
| Party | Reform |
| Leader's seat | Rye & Winchelsea |
| Last election | Did not stand |
| Current seats | 1 |
Incumbent Leader
Doug Oliver
RAOIC
No overall control (Note: RAOIC–Liberal Democrats–Labour–Green coalition.)

The 2027 Rother District Council election will be held on 6 May 2027 to elect members of Rother District Council in East Sussex, England. This will be on the same day as other local elections held across the United Kingdom.

== Background ==
=== Local government reorganisation ===
Due to proposed structural changes to local government in England, the 2023 election would have been the final election to the council before it was abolished and replaced by East Sussex Council, a new unitary authority. However, on 7 September 2026, the government announced it was withdrawing plans for the planned restructuring pending review. Following this announcement, local elections due to be held in 2027 under the existing local electoral calendar would proceed.

== Summary ==
=== Election result ===
2027 Rother District Council election
| Party | Candidates | Seats | Gains | Losses | Net gain/loss | Seats % | Votes % | Votes | +/− |
|---|---|---|---|---|---|---|---|---|---|
| Conservative | | 12 (Note: Current seats.) | | | | | | | |
| Liberal Democrats | | 9 | | | | | | | |
| Labour | | 6 | | | | | | | |
| Rother Association of Independent Councillors | | 6 | | | | | | | |
| Green | | 3 | | | | | | | |
| Independent | | 1 | | | | | | | |
| Reform | | 1 | | | | | | | |
