= 2027 Eastleigh Borough Council election =

2027 English local government election

- 6 May 2027

13 out of 39 seats to Eastleigh Borough Council 20 seats needed for a majority
Leader	Keith House	Louise Parker-Jones	Steven Broomfield
Party	Liberal Democrats	Independent	Conservative
Leader's seat	Hedge End South	Bishopstoke	West End & Horton Heath
Last election	34 seats, 41.2%	3 seats, 5.4%	1 seat, 15.2%
Current seats	35	3	1
Incumbent Leader
Keith House
Liberal Democrats

The 2027 Eastleigh Borough Council election will be held on 6 May 2027 to elect members of Eastleigh Borough Council in Hampshire, England. This will be on the same day as other local elections held across the United Kingdom.

== Background ==
=== Local government reorganisation ===
Due to proposed structural changes to local government in England, the 2026 election was intended to be the final election to the council before it was abolished and replaced by South West Hampshire, a new unitary authority.

However, on 7 September 2026, the government announced it was withdrawing plans for the planned restructuring pending review. Following this announcement, local elections due to be held in 2027 under the existing local electoral calendar would proceed.

== Summary ==
=== Election result ===
2027 Eastleigh Borough Council election
Party	This election				Full council			This election		
Party	Candidates	Seats	Net	Seats %	Other	Total	Total %	Votes	Votes %	+/−
Liberal Democrats					22					
Independent					2					
Conservative					1					

=== Incumbents ===
Ward	Incumbent councillor	Affiliation	Re-standing
Bishopstoke	Karen Caws	Independent	
Bursledon & Hound North	Jane O'Sullivan	Liberal Democrats	
Chandler's Ford	Dave Walker	Liberal Democrats	
Eastleigh Central	Mark Harding	Liberal Democrats	
Eastleigh North	Rosemary Reynolds	Liberal Democrats	
Eastleigh South	Darshan Mann	Liberal Democrats	
Fair Oak & Horton Heath	Michelle Marsh	Liberal Democrats	
Hamble & Netley	Alison Holland	Liberal Democrats	
Hedge End North	Ian Corben	Liberal Democrats	
Hedge End South	Jim Paine	Liberal Democrats	
Hiltingbury	James Duguid	Liberal Democrats	
West End North	Richard Gomer	Liberal Democrats	
West End South	Barry Du-Crow	Liberal Democrats	
