= 2027 Fenland District Council election =

2027 English local government election

- 6 May 2027

All 43 seats to Fenland District Council 22 seats needed for a majority
| Leader | Chris Boden | John Clark |
| Party | Conservative | Independent | Liberal Democrats |
| Leader's seat | Whittlesey East & Villages | March East |
| Last election | 35 seats, 56.9% | 6 seats, 17.8% | 2 seats, 5.0% |
| Current seats | 35 | 6 | 2 |
Incumbent Leader
Chris Boden
Conservative

The 2027 Fenland District Council election will be held on 6 May 2027 to elect members of Fenland District Council in Cambridgeshire, England. This will be on the same day as other local elections held across the United Kingdom.

== Background ==
=== Local government reorganisation ===
Due to proposed structural changes to local government in England, the 2023 election would have been the final election to the council before it was abolished and replaced by a new unitary authority. However, on 7 September 2026, the government announced it was withdrawing plans for the planned restructuring pending review. Following this announcement, local elections due to be held in 2027 under the existing local electoral calendar would proceed.

== Summary ==
=== Election result ===
2027 Fenland District Council election
| Party | Candidates | Seats | Gains | Losses | Net gain/loss | Seats % | Votes % | Votes | +/− |
|---|---|---|---|---|---|---|---|---|---|
| Conservative | | 35 (Note: Current seats.) | | | | | | | |
| Independent | | 6 | | | | | | | |
| Liberal Democrats | | 2 | | | | | | | |
