= 2027 New Forest District Council election =

2027 English local government election

- 6 May 2027

All 48 seats to New Forest District Council 25 seats needed for a majority
Leader	Jill Cleary	Malcolm Wade
Party	Conservative	Liberal Democrats	Independent
Leader's seat	Ashley, Bashley & Fernhill	Dibden & Hythe
Last election	26 seats, 42.1%	14 seats, 29.1%	4 seats, 7.4%
Current seats	25	14	4
Leader	Janet Richards		John Haywood
Party	Green	Reform	Labour
Leader's seat	Downlands & Forest North		Ringwood North & Ellingham
Last election	3 seats, 6.9%	Did not contest	1 seat, 14.3%
Current seats	2	2	1
Incumbent Leader
Jill Cleary
Conservative

The 2027 New Forest District Council election will be held on 6 May 2027 to elect members of New Forest District Council in Hampshire, England. This will be on the same day as other local elections held across the United Kingdom.

== Background ==
=== Local government reorganisation ===
Due to proposed structural changes to local government in England, the 2023 election would have been the final election to the council before it was abolished and replaced by Mid Hampshire Council and South West Hampshire Council, two new unitary authorities.

However, on 7 September 2026, the government announced it was withdrawing plans for the planned restructuring pending review. Following this announcement, local elections due to be held in 2027 under the existing local electoral calendar would proceed.

== Summary ==
=== Election result ===
2027 New Forest District Council election
Party	Candidates	Seats	Gains	Losses	Net gain/loss	Seats %	Votes %	Votes	+/−
Conservative		25 (Note: Current seats.)							
Liberal Democrats		14							
Independent		4							
Green		2							
Reform		2							
Labour		1							
