= 2027 Ashford Borough Council election =

2027 English local government election

- 6 May 2027

All 47 seats to Ashford Borough Council 24 seats needed for a majority
Leader	Johnny Shilton	Steve Campkin / Katrina Giles	Noel Ovenden
Party	Conservative	Green	Ashford Ind.
Leader's seat	Isle of Oxney	Willesborough / Park Farm South	Wye with Hinxhill
Last election	19 seats, 35.7%	8 seats, 18.1%	9 seats, 14.9%
Current seats	17	12	9
Leader	Brendan Chilton
Party	Labour	Independent
Leader's seat	Stanhope
Last election	11 seats, 25.1%	0 seats, 1.5%
Current seats	7	2
Incumbent Leader
Noel Ovenden
Ashford Ind.
No overall control (Note: Ashford Ind.–Green coalition.)

The 2027 Ashford Borough Council election will be held on 6 May 2027 to elect members of Ashford Borough Council in Kent, England. This will be on the same day as other local elections held across the United Kingdom.

== Background ==
=== Local government reorganisation ===
Due to proposed structural changes to local government in England, the 2026 election would have been the final election to the council before it was abolished and replaced by Mid Kent Council, a unitary authority. However, on 7 September 2026, the government announced it was withdrawing plans for the planned restructuring pending review. Following this announcement, local elections due to be held in 2027 under the existing local electoral calendar would proceed.

== Summary ==
=== Election result ===
2027 Ashford Borough Council election
Party	Candidates	Seats	Gains	Losses	Net gain/loss	Seats %	Votes %	Votes	+/−
Conservative		17 (Note: Current seats.)							
Green		12							
Ashford Ind.		9							
Labour		7							
Independent		2							
