= 2027 Brighton and Hove City Council election =

2027 English local government election

2027 Brighton & Hove City Council election
- 6 May 2027

All 54 seats to Brighton & Hove City Council 28 seats needed for a majority
Leader	Bella Sankey	Steve Davis	Alistair McNair
Party	Labour	Green	Conservative
Leader's seat	Wish	Preston Park	Patcham & Hollingbury
Last election	38 seats, 46.4%	7 seats, 26.5%	6 seats, 16.5%
Current seats	31	12	5
Leader		Bridget Fishleigh
Party	Independent	BHI
Leader's seat		Rottingdean & West Saltdean
Last election	1 seat, 2.2%	2 seats, 4.2%
Current seats	4	2
Incumbent Leader
Bella Sankey
Labour

The 2027 Brighton & Hove City Council election will be held on 6 May 2027 to elect members of Brighton & Hove City Council in East Sussex, England. This will be on the same day as other local elections held across the United Kingdom.

== Background ==
=== Local government reorganisation ===
Due to proposed structural changes to local government in England, the 2023 election would have been the final election to the council under its current boundaries before it was enlarged to include the western areas of Lewes District Council. However, on 7 September 2026, the government announced it was withdrawing plans for the planned restructuring pending review. Following this announcement, local elections to the council under its current boundary would be held in 2027.

== Summary ==
=== Election result ===
2027 Brighton & Hove City Council election
Party	Candidates	Seats	Gains	Losses	Net gain/loss	Seats %	Votes %	Votes	+/−
Labour		31 (Note: Current seats.)							
Green		12							
Conservative		5							
Independent		4							
Brighton and Hove Independents		2							
