= 2027 East Suffolk District Council election =

2027 English local government election

- 6 May 2027

All 55 seats to East Suffolk District Council 28 seats needed for a majority
Leader	Caroline Topping	Mark Jepson	Peter Byatt
Party	Green	Conservative	Labour
Leader's seat	Beccles & Worlingham	Eastern Felixstowe	Kirkley & Pakefield
Last election	16 seats, 26.8%	15 seats, 37.0%	12 seats, 19.7%
Current seats	16	15	11
Leader	Paul Ashton
Party	Liberal Democrats	Independent
Leader's seat	Wrentham, Wangford & Westleton
Last election	11 seats, 15.8%	1 seat, 0.5%
Current seats	9	4
Incumbent Leader
Caroline Topping
Green
No overall control (Note: Green–Liberal Democrats–Independent coalition.)

The 2027 East Suffolk District Council election will be held on 6 May 2027 to elect members of East Suffolk District Council in Suffolk, England. This will be on the same day as other local elections held across the United Kingdom.

== Background ==
=== Local government reorganisation ===
Due to proposed structural changes to local government in England, the 2023 election would have been the final election to the council before it was abolished and replaced by Central & East Suffolk Council, a unitary authority. However, on 7 September 2026, the government announced it was withdrawing plans for the planned restructuring pending review. Following this announcement, local elections due to be held in 2027 under the existing local electoral calendar would proceed.

== Summary ==
=== Election result ===
2027 East Suffolk District Council election
Party	Candidates	Seats	Gains	Losses	Net gain/loss	Seats %	Votes %	Votes	+/−
Green		16 (Note: Current seats.)							
Conservative		15							
Labour		11							
Liberal Democrats		9							
Independent		4							
