= 2027 Norwich City Council election =

2027 English local government election

- 6 May 2027

13 out of 39 seats to Norwich City Council 20 seats needed for a majority
Leader	Lucy Galvin	Carli Harper	James Wright
Party	Green	Labour	Liberal Democrats
Leader's seat	Nelson	Lakenham	Eaton
Last election	21 seats, 44.0%	12 seats, 20.3%	3 seats, 8.8%
Current seats	21	12	3
Party	Reform	Independent
Last election	2 seats, 20.7%	1 seat, 0.0%
Current seats	2	1
Incumbent Leader
Lucy Galvin
Green

The 2027 Norwich City Council election will be held on 6 May 2027 to elect members of Norwich City Council in Norfolk, England. This will be on the same day as other local elections held across the United Kingdom.

== Background ==
=== Local government reorganisation ===
Due to proposed structural changes to local government in England, the 2026 election was intended to be the final election to the council before it was abolished and replaced by Greater Norwich Council, a unitary authority. However, on 7 September 2026, the government announced it was withdrawing plans for the planned restructuring pending review. Following this announcement, local elections due to be held in 2027 under the existing local electoral calendar would proceed.

== Summary ==
=== Election result ===
2027 Norwich City Council election
Party	This election				Full council			This election		
Party	Candidates	Seats	Net	Seats %	Other	Total	Total %	Votes	Votes %	+/−
Green					16					
Labour					6					
Liberal Democrats					2					
Reform					2					
Independent					0					

=== Incumbents ===
Ward	Incumbent councillor	Affiliation	Re-standing
Bowthorpe	Richard Lawes	Labour	
Catton Grove	Jess Carrington	Labour	
Crome	Matthew Packer	Labour	
Eaton	Judith Lubbock	Liberal Democrats	
Lakenham	Keith Driver	Labour	
Mancroft	Amanda Fox	Green	
Mile Cross	Jacob Huntley	Labour	
Nelson	Hannah Hoechner	Green	
Sewell	Jenny Knight	Green	
Thorpe Hamlet	Josh Worley-Smith	Green	
Town Close	Karen Davis (Note: Originally elected as Labour, but later left the party to sit as an independent.)	Independent	
University	Beth Jones	Labour	
Wensum	Ben Price	Green	
