= 2027 Stevenage Borough Council election =

2027 English local government election

- 6 May 2027

13 out of 39 seats to Stevenage Borough Council 20 seats needed for a majority
Leader	Richard Henry	Liam Phillips	Andy McGuinness
Party	Labour Co-op	Reform	Liberal Democrats
Leader's seat	St Nicholas	Roebuck	Manor
Last election	23 seats, 23.0%	10 seats, 35.2%	6 seats, 12.5%
Current seats	21	10	6
Leader	Phil Bibby
Party	Conservative	Independent
Leader's seat	Woodfield
Last election	1 seat, 13.3%	Did not stand
Current seats	1	1
Incumbent Leader
Richard Henry
Labour Co-op

The 2027 Stevenage Borough Council election will be held on 6 May 2027 to elect members of Stevenage Borough Council in Hertfordshire, England. This will be on the same day as other local elections held across the United Kingdom.

== Background ==
=== Local government reorganisation ===
Due to proposed structural changes to local government in England, the 2026 election was intended to be the final election to the council before it was abolished and replaced by Central Hertfordshire Council, a new unitary authority. However, on 7 September 2026, the government announced it was withdrawing plans for the planned restructuring pending review. Following this announcement, local elections due to be held in 2027 under the existing local electoral calendar would proceed.

== Summary ==
=== Election result ===
2027 Stevenage Borough Council election
Party	This election				Full council			This election		
Party	Candidates	Seats	Net	Seats %	Other	Total	Total %	Votes	Votes %	+/−
Labour Co-op					11					
Reform					10					
Liberal Democrats					4					
Conservative					1					
Independent					0					

=== Incumbents ===
Ward	Incumbent councillor	Affiliation	Re-standing
Almond Hill	Tom Plater	Labour Co-op	
Bandley Hill & Poplars	Jade Woods	Labour Co-op	
Bedwell	Nazmin Chowdhury	Labour Co-op	
Chells	Tom Wren	Liberal Democrats	
Longmeadow	Lynda Guy	Labour Co-op	
Manor	Andy McGuinness	Liberal Democrats	
Martins Wood	Lloyd Briscoe	Labour Co-op	
Old Town	Nigel Williams	Labour Co-op	
Roebuck	Forhad Chowdhury	Labour Co-op	
Shephall	Sarah Mead (Note: Originally elected as Labour Co-op, but later left the party to sit as an independent.)	Independent	
St Nicholas	Richard Henry	Labour Co-op	
Symonds Green	Loraine Rossati	Labour Co-op	
Woodfield	Leanne Brady	Labour	
