= 2027 Eastbourne Borough Council election =

2027 English local government election

- 6 May 2027

All 27 seats to Eastbourne Borough Council 14 seats needed for a majority
Leader	Stephen Holt	Robert Smart
Party	Liberal Democrats	Conservative
Leader's seat	Devonshire	Meads
Last election	19 seats, 50.7%	8 seats, 33.9%
Current seats	19	8
Incumbent Leader
Stephen Holt
Liberal Democrats

The 2027 Eastbourne Borough Council election will be held on 6 May 2027 to elect members of Eastbourne Borough Council in East Sussex, England. This will be on the same day as other local elections held across the United Kingdom.

== Background ==
=== Local government reorganisation ===
Due to proposed structural changes to local government in England, the 2023 election would have been the final election to the council before it was abolished and replaced by East Sussex Council, a new unitary authority. However, on 7 September 2026, the government announced it was withdrawing plans for the planned restructuring pending review. Following this announcement, local elections due to be held in 2027 under the existing local electoral calendar would proceed.

== Summary ==
=== Election result ===
2027 Eastbourne Borough Council election
Party	Candidates	Seats	Gains	Losses	Net gain/loss	Seats %	Votes %	Votes	+/−
Liberal Democrats		19 (Note: Current seats.)							
Conservative		8							
