= 2027 Arun District Council election =

2027 English local government election

- 6 May 2027

All 54 seats to Arun District Council 28 seats needed for a majority
Leader	Shaun Gunner	Martin Lury	Mike Northeast
Party	Conservative	Liberal Democrats	Labour
Leader's seat	Rustington East	Bersted	Courtwick with Toddington
Last election	20 seats, 40.6%	14 seats, 21.1%	8 seats, 14.9%
Current seats	19	14	8
Leader	(Note: David Huntley is the leader of the Independent Group. Steve Goodheart is leader of the Arun Independent Group.)	Sue Wallsgrove	Trevor Bence
Party	Independent	Green	Reform
Leader's seat	(Note: David Huntley is a sitting councillor for Pagham ward. Steve Goodheart is a sitting councillor for Hotham ward.)	Barnham	Aldwick East
Last election	6 seats, 8.3%	6 seats, 14.5%	Did not stand
Current seats	6	5	2
Incumbent Leader
Martin Lury
Liberal Democrats
No overall control (Note: Liberal Democrats–Labour–Independent–Green coalition.)

The 2027 Arun District Council election will be held on 6 May 2027 to elect members of Arun District Council in West Sussex, England. This will be on the same day as other local elections held across the United Kingdom.

== Background ==
=== Local government reorganisation ===
Due to proposed structural changes to local government in England, the 2023 election would have been the final election to the council before it was abolished and replaced by a new unitary authority, although the structure of this new authority was yet to be decided. However, on 7 September 2026, the government announced it was withdrawing plans for the planned restructuring pending review. Following this announcement, local elections due to be held in 2027 under the existing local electoral calendar would proceed.

== Summary ==
=== Election result ===
2027 Arun District Council election
Party	Candidates	Seats	Gains	Losses	Net gain/loss	Seats %	Votes %	Votes	+/−
Conservative		19 (Note: Current seats.)							
Liberal Democrats		14							
Labour		8							
Independent		6							
Green		5							
Reform		2							
