= 2027 Mid Sussex District Council election =

2027 English local government election

- 6 May 2027

All 48 seats to Mid Sussex District Council 25 seats needed for a majority
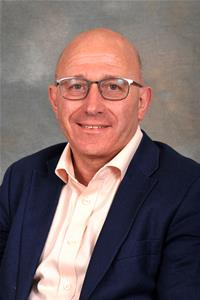
| | | Con | Ind |
| Leader | Robert Eggleston | Gary Marsh | Ian Gibson |
| Party | Liberal Democrats | Conservative | Independent |
| Leader's seat | Burgess Hill Meeds & Hammonds | Ardingly, Balcombe & Turners Hill | Crawley Down |
| Last election | 20 seats, 36.9% | 18 seats, 32.9% | 5 seats, 10.4% |
| Current seats | 19 | 18 | 6 |
| Leader | Matthew Cornish | Paul Kenny |
| Party | Green | Labour |
| Leader's seat | Burgess Hill St Andrew's | Haywards Heath Franklands |
| Last election | 4 seats, 12.0% | 1 seat, 7.7% |
| Current seats | 4 | 1 |
Incumbent Leader
Robert Eggleston
Liberal Democrats
No overall control (Note: Liberal Democrats–Independent coalition.)

The 2027 Mid Sussex District Council election will be held on 6 May 2027 to elect members of Mid Sussex District Council in West Sussex, England. This will be on the same day as other local elections held across the United Kingdom.

== Background ==
=== Local government reorganisation ===
Due to proposed structural changes to local government in England, the 2023 election would have been the final election to the council before it was abolished and replaced by a new unitary authority, although the structure of this new authority was yet to be decided.

However, on 7 September 2026, the government announced it was withdrawing plans for the planned restructuring pending review. Following this announcement, local elections due to be held in 2027 under the existing local electoral calendar would proceed.

== Summary ==
=== Election result ===
2027 Mid Sussex District Council election
| Party | Candidates | Seats | Gains | Losses | Net gain/loss | Seats % | Votes % | Votes | +/− |
|---|---|---|---|---|---|---|---|---|---|
| Liberal Democrats | | 19 (Note: Current seats.) | | | | | | | |
| Conservative | | 18 | | | | | | | |
| Independent | | 6 | | | | | | | |
| Green | | 4 | | | | | | | |
| Labour | | 1 | | | | | | | |
