= 2027 East Lindsey District Council election =

2027 English local government election

- 6 May 2027

All 55 seats to East Lindsey District Council 28 seats needed for a majority
Leader	Craig Leyland		Claire Arnold
Party	Conservative	Independent	Labour
Leader's seat	Woodhall Spa		Mablethorpe
Last election	26 seats, 38.4%	16 seats, 26.2%	6 seats, 23.0%
Current seats	25	15	6
Leader	Danny Brookes	Fiona Martin	Robert Watson
Party	Reform	Liberal Democrats	Green
Leader's seat	Skegness Winthorpe	Horncastle	Sutton on Sea
Last election	0 seats, 0.2%	1 seat, 1.8%	1 seat, 1.8%
Current seats	6	2	1
Incumbent Leader
Craig Leyland
Conservative
Minority Conservative administration

The 2027 East Lindsey District Council election will be held on 6 May 2027 to elect members of East Lindsey District Council in Lincolnshire, England. This will be on the same day as other local elections held across the United Kingdom.

== Background ==
=== Local Government Reorganisation ===
Due to proposed structural changes to local government in England, the 2023 election would have been the final election to the council before it was abolished and replaced by Rural Lincolnshire Council, a unitary authority. However, on 7 September 2026, the government announced it was withdrawing plans for the planned restructuring pending review. Following this announcement, local elections due to be held in 2027 under the existing local electoral calendar would proceed.

== Summary ==
=== Election Result ===
2027 East Lindsey District Council election
Party	Candidates	Seats	Gains	Losses	Net gain/loss	Seats %	Votes %	Votes	+/−
Conservative		25							
Independent		15							
Labour		6							
Reform		6							
Liberal Democrats		2							
Green		1							

(Note: The now defunct Skegness Urban District Society (SUDS) won 5 seats in the 2023 election)
