= 2027 Great Yarmouth Borough Council election =

2027 English local government election

- 6 May 2027

All 39 seats to Great Yarmouth Borough Council 20 seats needed for a majority
Leader	TBA	Carl Smith
Party	Labour	Conservative
Leader's seat		Bradwell North
Last election		19 seats, 43.6%
Current seats	17	17
Leader	Barry Gravenell
Party	Great Yarmouth First	Independent
Last election		2 seats, 6.8%
Current seats	1	3
Incumbent Leader
Carl Smith
Conservative
No overall control (Note: Conservative minority.)

The 2027 Great Yarmouth Borough Council election will be held on 6 May 2027 to elect members of Great Yarmouth Borough Council in Norfolk, England. This will be on the same day as other local elections held across the United Kingdom.

== Background ==
=== Local government reorganisation ===
Due to proposed structural changes to local government in England, the 2023 election would have been the final election to the council before it was abolished and replaced by East Norfolk Council, a unitary authority. However, on 7 September 2026, the government announced it was withdrawing plans for the planned restructuring pending review. Following this announcement, local elections due to be held in 2027 under the existing local electoral calendar would proceed.

== Summary ==
=== Election result ===
2027 Great Yarmouth Borough Council election
Party	Candidates	Seats	Gains	Losses	Net gain/loss	Seats %	Votes %	Votes	+/−
Labour		17 (Note: Current seats.)							
Conservative		17							
Independent		3							
Great Yarmouth First		1							
