= 2027 North Norfolk District Council election =

2027 English local government election

- 6 May 2027

All 40 seats to North Norfolk District Council 21 seats needed for a majority
Leader	Tim Adams	Christopher Cushing	Jeremy Punchard
Party	Liberal Democrats	Conservative	Independent
Leader's seat	Cromer Town	Lancaster North	Lancaster South
Last election	25 seats, 43.0%	12 seats, 35.8%	3 seats, 8.0%
Current seats	26	11	3
Incumbent Leader
Tim Adams
Liberal Democrats

The 2027 North Norfolk District Council election will be held on 6 May 2027 to elect members of North Norfolk District Council in Norfolk, England. This will be on the same day as other local elections held across the United Kingdom.

== Background ==
=== Local government reorganisation ===
Due to proposed structural changes to local government in England, the 2023 election would have been the final election to the council before it was abolished and replaced by East Norfolk Council and West Norfolk Council, both unitary authorities. However, on 7 September 2026, the government announced it was withdrawing plans for the planned restructuring pending review. Following this announcement, local elections due to be held in 2027 under the existing local electoral calendar would proceed.

== Summary ==
=== Election result ===
2027 North Norfolk District Council election
Party	Candidates	Seats	Gains	Losses	Net gain/loss	Seats %	Votes %	Votes	+/−
Liberal Democrats		26 (Note: Current seats.)							
Conservative		11							
Independent		3							
