= 2027 Dover District Council election =

2027 English local government election

- 6 May 2027

All 32 seats to Dover District Council 17 seats needed for a majority
Leader	Trevor Bartlett	Kevin Mills
Party	Conservative	Labour
Leader's seat	Little Stour & Ashstone	Buckland
Last election	14 seats, 37.8%	17 seats, 40.7%
Current seats	13	12
Leader	Jamie Pout (Note: Leader of the Independent Group.)	Ingrid Dodd
Party	Independent	Green
Leader's seat	Aylesham, Eythorne & Shepherdswell	Guston, Kingsdown & St Margaret's-at-Cliffe
Last election	1 seat, 5.1%	0 seats, 9.1%
Current seats	6 (Note: Of the 6 Independent councillors sitting prior to the election, 4 sat in the Independent Group and 2 were non-aligned.)	1
Incumbent Leader
Kevin Mills
Labour
No overall control (Note: Labour minority.)

The 2027 Dover District Council election will be held on 6 May 2027 to elect members of Dover District Council in Kent, England. This will be on the same day as other local elections held across the United Kingdom.

== Background ==
=== Local government reorganisation ===
Due to proposed structural changes to local government in England, the 2023 election would have been the final election to the council before it was abolished and replaced by East Kent Council, a unitary authority. However, on 7 September 2026, the government announced it was withdrawing plans for the planned restructuring pending review. Following this announcement, local elections due to be held in 2027 under the existing local electoral calendar would proceed.

== Summary ==
=== Election result ===
2027 Dover District Council election
Party	Candidates	Seats	Gains	Losses	Net gain/loss	Seats %	Votes %	Votes	+/−
Conservative		13 (Note: Current seats.)							
Labour		12							
Independent		6							
Green		1							
