= 2027 Welwyn Hatfield Borough Council election =

2027 English local government election

- 6 May 2027

16 out of 48 seats to Welwyn Hatfield Borough Council 25 seats needed for a majority
Leader	Rose Grewal	Sandreni Bonfante	Tony Kingsbury
Party	Labour	Liberal Democrats	Conservative
Leader's seat	Hatfield Villages	Welham Green & Hatfield South	Welwyn West
Last election	16 seats, 15.9%	15 seats, 19.8%	12 seats, 23.3%
Current seats	16	15	12
Party	Reform	Independent
Last election	3 seats, 27.4%	2 seats, 0.0%
Current seats	3	2
Incumbent Leader
Rose Grewal
Labour
No overall control (Note: Labour–Liberal Democrats coalition.)

The 2027 Welwyn Hatfield Borough Council election will be held on 6 May 2027 to elect members of Welwyn Hatfield Borough Council in Hertfordshire, England. This will be on the same day as other local elections held across the United Kingdom.

== Background ==
=== Local government reorganisation ===
Due to proposed structural changes to local government in England, the 2026 election was intended to be the final election to the council before it was abolished and replaced by Central Hertfordshire Council and East Hertfordshire & Broxbourne Council, two new unitary authorities. However, on 7 September 2026, the government announced it was withdrawing plans for the planned restructuring pending review. Following this announcement, local elections due to be held in 2027 under the existing local electoral calendar would proceed.

== Summary ==
=== Election result ===
2027 Welwyn Hatfield Borough Council election
Party	This election				Full council			This election		
Party	Candidates	Seats	Net	Seats %	Other	Total	Total %	Votes	Votes %	+/−
Labour					11					
Liberal Democrats					9					
Conservative					8					
Reform					3					
Independent					1					

=== Incumbents ===
Ward	Incumbent councillor	Affiliation	Re-standing
Brookmans Park & Little Heath	Fiona Thomson	Conservative	
Haldens	Astrid Scott	Labour	
Handside	Michal Siewniak	Liberal Democrats	
Hatfield Central	Kieran Thorpe	Labour	
Hatfield East	Cathy Watson	Labour	
Hatfield South West	Helena Goldwater	Liberal Democrats	
Hatfield Villages	Rose Grewal	Labour	
Hollybush	Margaret Birleson	Labour	
Howlands	Jill Weston (Note: Originally elected as Labour, but later left the party to sit as an independent.)	Independent	
Northaw & Cuffley	George Michaelides	Conservative	
Panshanger	Jane Quinton	Liberal Democrats	
Peartree	Fauzia Haider	Liberal Democrats	
Sherrards	Frank Marsh	Liberal Democrats	
Welham Green & Hatfield South	Adrienne Nix	Liberal Democrats	
Welwyn East	Durk Reyner	Conservative	
Welwyn West	Tony Kingsbury	Conservative	
