= 2027 Cheshire East Council election =

2027 English local election

- 6 May 2027

All 87 seats to Cheshire East Council 44 seats needed for a majority

Leader	Stewart Gardiner	Nick Mannion
Party	Conservative	Labour	Independent
Last election	33 seats, 36.7%	31 seats, 30.2%	16 seats, 11.1%
Current seats	32	28	19
Leader	Rod Fletcher	John Knight	Reg Kain
Party	Liberal Democrats	Green	Reform
Last election	2 seats, 8.0%	0 seats, 7.0%	0 seats, 0.1%
Current seats	1	1	1
- Blank map showing the new Boundaries
Incumbent Leader
Nick Mannion
Labour
No overall control

The 2027 Cheshire East Council election will be heldon Thursday 6 May 2027 to elect all 87 members of Cheshire East Council in Cheshire, England. It is scheduled to be on the same day as other local elections across England.

The council has been under no overall control since 2019, being run by a Labour minority administration with support from independent councillors. The number of councillors elected will rise from 82 to 87, upon boundary changes.
