= 2027 Havant Borough Council election =

2027 English local government election

- 6 May 2027

12 out of 36 seats to Havant Borough Council 19 seats needed for a majority
Leader	Sharon Collings	Gillian Harris	Netty Shepherd
Party	Reform	Labour	Green
Leader's seat	Leigh Park Central & West Leigh	Havant St Faith's	Hayling East
Last election	10 seats, 41.6%	7 seats, 8.7%	6 seats, 13.1%
Current seats	10	7	6 (Note: Including the vacant seat in Emsworth last held by a Green.)
Leader	Ryan Brent	Philippa Gray
Party	Conservative	Liberal Democrats	Independent
Leader's seat	Waterloo	Bedhampton
Last election	5 seats, 25.9%	5 seats, 10.7%	3 seats, 0.0%
Current seats	5	5	3
Incumbent Leader
Gillian Harris
Labour
No overall control (Note: Labour–Green–Liberal Democrats minority coalition.)

The 2027 Havant Borough Council election will be held on 6 May 2027 to elect members of Havant Borough Council in Hampshire, England. This will be on the same day as other local elections held across the United Kingdom.

== Background ==
=== Local government reorganisation ===
Due to proposed structural changes to local government in England, the 2026 election was intended to be the final election to the council before it was abolished and replaced by South East Hampshire Council, a new unitary authority.

However, on 7 September 2026, the government announced it was withdrawing plans for the planned restructuring pending review. Following this announcement, local elections due to be held in 2027 under the existing local electoral calendar would proceed.

== Summary ==
=== Election result ===
2027 Havant Borough Council election
Party	This election				Full council			This election		
Party	Candidates	Seats	Net	Seats %	Other	Total	Total %	Votes	Votes %	+/−
Reform					9					
Labour					4					
Green					4					
Conservative					3					
Liberal Democrats					2					
Independent					2					

=== Incumbents ===
Ward	Incumbent councillor	Affiliation	Re-standing
Bedhampton	Michael Lind	Liberal Democrats	
Cowplain	Nail Bowdell	Conservative	
Emsworth	Reuben Mychaleckyj	Green	
Hart Plain	Elaine Shimbart	Independent	
Havant St Faith's	Gillian Harris	Labour	
Hayling East	Netty Shepherd	Green	
Hayling West	Wilf Forrow	Liberal Democrats	
Leigh Park Central & West Leigh	Munazza Faiz	Labour	
Leigh Park Hermitage	Amy Redsull	Labour	
Purbrook	Paul Tansom	Liberal Democrats	
Stakes	Sarah Milne	Reform	
Waterloo	Peter Wade	Conservative	
