= 2027 Sevenoaks District Council election =

2027 English local government election

- 6 May 2027

All 54 seats to Sevenoaks District Council 28 seats needed for a majority
Leader	Kevin Maskell	Alan Leaman	Julia Thornton (Note: Leader of the West Kent Independent Group.)
Party	Conservative	Liberal Democrats	Independent
Leader's seat	Westerham & Crockham Hill	Sevenoaks Northern	Seal & Weald
Last election	33 seats, 51.1%	14 seats, 28.1%	3 seats, 5.3%
Current seats	27	14	7
Leader	Laura Manston
Party	Green	Reform
Leader's seat	Ash & New Ash Green
Last election	4 seats, 10.7%	0 seats, 0.1%
Current seats	4	2
Incumbent Leader
Kevin Maskell
Conservative
No overall control (Note: Conservative minority.)

The 2027 Sevenoaks District Council election will be held on 6 May 2027 to elect members of Sevenoaks District Council in Kent, England. This will be on the same day as other local elections held across the United Kingdom.

== Background ==
=== Local government reorganisation ===
Due to proposed structural changes to local government in England, the 2023 election would have been the final election to the council before it was abolished and replaced by West Kent Council, a new unitary authority. However, on 7 September 2026, the government announced it was withdrawing plans for the planned restructuring pending review. Following this announcement, local elections due to be held in 2027 under the existing local electoral calendar would proceed.

== Summary ==
=== Election result ===
2027 Sevenoaks District Council election
Party	Candidates	Seats	Gains	Losses	Net gain/loss	Seats %	Votes %	Votes	+/−
Conservative		27 (Note: Current seats.)							
Liberal Democrats		14							
Independent		7							
Green		4							
Reform		2							
