= 2027 Gravesham Borough Council election =

2027 English local government election

- 6 May 2027

All 39 seats to Gravesham Borough Council 20 seats needed for a majority
Leader	John Burden	Jordan Meade	Aaron Elliott
Party	Labour	Conservative	Reform
Leader's seat	Rosherville	Higham & Shorne	Riverview Park
Last election	22 seats, 45.8%	17 seats, 48.6%	0 seats, 0.7%
Current seats	22	12	5
Incumbent Leader
John Burden
Labour

The 2027 Gravesham Borough Council election will be held on 6 May 2027 to elect members of Gravesham Borough Council in Kent, England. This will be on the same day as other local elections held across the United Kingdom.

== Background ==
=== Local government reorganisation ===
Due to proposed structural changes to local government in England, the 2023 election would have been the final election to the council before it was abolished and replaced by North Kent Council, a new unitary authority. However, on 7 September 2026, the government announced it was withdrawing plans for the planned restructuring pending review. Following this announcement, local elections due to be held in 2027 under the existing local electoral calendar would proceed.

== Summary ==
=== Election result ===
2027 Gravesham Borough Council election
Party	Candidates	Seats	Gains	Losses	Net gain/loss	Seats %	Votes %	Votes	+/−
Labour		22 (Note: Current seats.)							
Conservative		12							
Reform		5							
