= 2027 Winchester City Council election =

2027 English local government election

- 6 May 2027

16 out of 45 seats to Winchester City Council 23 seats needed for a majority
| Leader | Martin Tod | Caroline Horrill |
| Party | Liberal Democrats | Conservative |
| Leader's seat | St Paul | Wonston & Micheldever |
| Last election | 36 seats, 41.6% | 4 seats, 22.2% |
| Current seats | 36 | 4 |
| Party | Independent | Green |
| Last election | 1 seat, 2.8% | 4 seats, 14.4% |
| Current seats | 3 | 2 |
Incumbent Leader
Martin Tod
Liberal Democrats

The 2027 Winchester City Council election will be held on 6 May 2027 to elect members of Winchester City Council in Hampshire, England. This will be on the same day as other local elections held across the United Kingdom.

== Summary ==
=== Background ===
In 2026, the Liberal Democrats retained control of the council, gaining 4 seats from the Conservatives. With both the Conservative and Green parties on 4 seats each, the Green Party formed an Independent and Green Group with the sole independent councillor, becoming the principal opposition with five seats.

==== Local government reorganisation ====
Due to proposed structural changes to local government in England, the 2026 election was intended to be the final election to the council before it was abolished and replaced by Mid Hampshire Council and South East Hampshire Council, two new unitiary authorities.

However, on 7 September 2026, the government announced it was withdrawing plans for the planned restructuring pending review. Following this announcement, local elections due to be held in 2027 under the existing local electoral calendar would proceed.

=== Council Composition ===
| After 2026 election | | Before 2027 election | |
| Party | Seats | Party | Seats |
|---|---|---|---|
| Liberal Democrats | 36 | Liberal Democrats | 36 |
| Conservative | 4 | Conservative | 4 |
| Green | 4 | Green | 2 |
| Independent | 1 | Independent | 3 |

Changes 2026-2027:

- October 2026: Malcolm Wallace and Danny Lee resign from Green Party, remaining part of Green and Independent opposition group.

=== Incumbents ===
| Ward | Incumbent councillor | Affiliation | Re-standing |
|---|---|---|---|
| Alresford & Itchen Valley | Russell Gordon-Smith | Liberal Democrats | |
| Badger Farm & Oliver's Battery | Adrian Brophy | Liberal Democrats | |
| Bishop's Waltham | Jonathan Williams | Liberal Democrats | |
| Central Meon Valley | Danny Lee (Note: Elected as Green Party of England and Wales) | Independent | |
| Colden Common & Twyford | Liam Bailey-Morgan | Green | |
| Denmead | Paula Langford-Smith | Conservative | |
| Southwick & Wickham | Chris Chamberlain | Liberal Democrats | |
| St Barnabas | Jonny Morris | Liberal Democrats | |
| St Bartholomew | Nathan Eve | Liberal Democrats | |
| St Luke | Charlie Wise | Liberal Democrats | |
| St Michael | Richard Murphy | Liberal Democrats | |
| St Paul | Martin Tod | Liberal Democrats | |
| The Worthys | Jane Rutter | Liberal Democrats | |
| Upper Meon Valley | Jerry Pett | Liberal Democrats | |
| Whiteley & Shedfield | Sudhakar Achwal | Liberal Democrats | |
| Wonston & Micheldever | Caroline Horrill | Conservative | |
