= 2027 Ipswich Borough Council election =

2027 English local government election

- 6 May 2027

16 out of 48 seats to Ipswich Borough Council 25 seats needed for a majority
Leader	Neil MacDonald		Ian Fisher
Party	Labour Co-op	Reform	Conservative
Leader's seat	St John's		Castle Hill
Last election	29 seats, 26.8%	10 seats, 31.7%	5 seats, 14.3%
Current seats	29	10	5
Leader		David Plowman
Party	Liberal Democrats	Green
Leader's seat		Alexandra
Last election	3 seats, 8.2%	1 seat, 19.0%
Current seats	3	1
Incumbent Leader
Neil MacDonald
Labour Co-op

The 2027 Ipswich Borough Council election will be held on 6 May 2027 to elect members of Ipswich Borough Council in Suffolk, England. This will be on the same day as other local elections held across the United Kingdom.

== Background ==
=== Local government reorganisation ===
Due to proposed structural changes to local government in England, the 2026 election was intended to be the final election to the council before it was abolished and replaced by Ipswich & South Suffolk Council, a unitary authority. However, on 7 September 2026, the government announced it was withdrawing plans for the planned restructuring pending review. Following this announcement, local elections due to be held in 2027 under the existing local electoral calendar would proceed.

== Summary ==
=== Election result ===
2027 Ipswich Borough Council election
Party	This election				Full council			This election		
Party	Candidates	Seats	Net	Seats %	Other	Total	Total %	Votes	Votes %	+/−
Labour					17					
Reform					10					
Conservative					2					
Liberal Democrats					2					
Green					1					

=== Incumbents ===
Ward	Incumbent councillor	Affiliation	Re-standing
Alexandra	Jane Riley	Labour	
Bixley	Richard Pope	Conservative	
Bridge	Philip Smart	Labour	
Castle Hill	Erion Xhaferaj	Conservative	
Gainsborough	Martin Cook	Labour	
Gipping	Peter Gardiner	Labour	
Holywells	Cathy Frost	Labour Co-op	
Priory Heath	Ruman Muhith	Labour	
Rushmere	Kelvin Cracknell	Labour Co-op	
Sprites	Jenny Smith	Labour	
St John's	Elango Elavalakan	Labour Co-op	
St Margaret's	Tim Lockington	Liberal Democrats	
Stoke Park	Nathan Wilson	Conservative	
Westgate	Julian Gibbs	Labour Co-op	
Whitehouse	Lucy Trenchard	Labour	
Whitton	Gary Forster	Labour	
