= 2027 Slough Borough Council election =

2027 English local government election

- 6 May 2027

All 42 seats to Slough Borough Council 22 seats needed for a majority
Leader	Wal Chahal	Fiza Matloob	Sabia Akram
Party	Conservative	Labour	Liberal Democrats
Leader's seat	Langley Marsh	Baylis & Salt Hill	Farnham
Last election	21 seats, 46.3%	18 seats, 42.8%	3 seats, 4.5%
Current seats	17	11	10
Leader		Chloe Hart
Party	Independent	Green
Leader's seat		Cippenham Green
Last election	0 seats, 3.3%	0 seats, 1.3%
Current seats	3	1
Incumbent Leader
Wal Chahal
Conservative
No overall control (Note: Conservative–Liberal Democrats coalition.)

The 2027 Slough Borough Council election will be held on 6 May 2027 to elect members of Slough Borough Council in Berkshire, England. This will be on the same day as other local elections held across the United Kingdom.

== Summary ==
=== Election result ===
2027 Slough Borough Council election
Party	Candidates	Seats	Gains	Losses	Net gain/loss	Seats %	Votes %	Votes	+/−
Conservative		17 (Note: Current seats.)							
Labour		11							
Liberal Democrats		10							
Independent		3							
Green		1							
