= 2027 Cheshire West and Chester Council election =

2027 English local election

- 6 May 2027

All 70 seats to Cheshire East Council 36 seats needed for a majority

Leader	Louise Gittins	Adrian Waddelove
Party	Labour	Conservative	Independent
Leader's seat	Little Neston	Farndon
Last election	39 seats, 42.6%	23 seats, 31.7%	5 seats, 6.8%
Current seats	34	20	9
Leader	Chris Copeman	Mandy Clare	Reg Kain
Party	Green	Reform	Liberal Democrats
Leader's seat	Helsby	Winsford Dene
Last election	2 seats, 5.6%	0 seats, 0.3%	1 seat, 12.9%
Current seats	3	3	1
- Blank map of Wards up for election
Incumbent Leader
Louise Gittins
Labour
No overall control

The 2027 Cheshire West and Chester Council election will be heldon Thursday 6 May 2027 to elect all 70 members of Cheshire West and Chester Council in Cheshire, England. It is scheduled to be on the same day as other local elections across England.

The council has been under no overall control since 2025, being run by a Labour minority administration.
