= 2027 Thanet District Council election =

2027 English local government election

- 6 May 2027

All 56 seats to Thanet District Council 29 seats needed for a majority
Leader	Rick Everitt	George Kup	Tricia Austin
Party	Labour	Conservative	Green
Leader's seat	Newington	Birchington North	Central Harbour
Last election	30 seats, 40.4%	17 seats, 32.4%	5 seats, 15.8%
Current seats	29	13	6
Leader	Barry Manners
Party	Reform	Independent
Leader's seat	Cliftonville East
Last election	0 seats, 0.4%	1 seat, 3.2%
Current seats	5	3
Incumbent Leader
Rick Everitt
Labour

The 2027 Thanet District Council election will be held on 6 May 2027 to elect members of Thanet District Council in Kent, England. This will be on the same day as other local elections held across the United Kingdom.

== Background ==
=== Local government reorganisation ===
Due to proposed structural changes to local government in England, the 2023 election would have been the final election to the council before it was abolished and replaced by East Kent Council, a new unitary authority. However, on 7 September 2026, the government announced it was withdrawing plans for the planned restructuring pending review. Following this announcement, local elections due to be held in 2027 under the existing local electoral calendar would proceed.

== Summary ==
=== Election result ===
2027 Thanet District Council election
Party	Candidates	Seats	Gains	Losses	Net gain/loss	Seats %	Votes %	Votes	+/−
Labour		29 (Note: Current seats.)							
Conservative		13							
Green		6							
Reform		5							
Independent		3							
