= 2027 Braintree District Council election =

2027 English local government election

- 6 May 2027

All 49 seats to Braintree District Council 25 seats needed for a majority
Leader	Tom Cunningham	Lynn Jeffries	James Abbott
Party	Conservative	Labour	Green
Leader's seat	Great Notley & Black Notley	Bocking North	Silver End & Cressing
Last election	26 seats, 39.8%	9 seats, 26.8%	4 seats, 15.5%
Current seats	30	9	4
Leader	Jackie Pell		Nathan Robbins
Party	Residents	Independent	Reform
Leader's seat	Halstead Trinity		Coggeshall
Last election	3 seats, 3.5%	7 seats, 10.2%	0 seats, 0.5%
Current seats	3	2	1
Incumbent Leader
Tom Cunningham
Conservative

The 2027 Braintree District Council election will be held on 6 May 2027 to elect members of Braintree District Council in Essex, England. This will be on the same day as other local elections held across the United Kingdom.

== Background ==
=== Local government reorganisation ===
Due to proposed structural changes to local government in England, the 2023 election would have been the final election to the council before it was abolished and replaced by North East Essex Council, a unitary authority. However, on 7 September 2026, the government announced it was withdrawing plans for the planned restructuring pending review. Following this announcement, local elections due to be held in 2027 under the existing local electoral calendar would proceed.

== Summary ==
=== Election result ===
2027 Braintree District Council election
Party	Candidates	Seats	Gains	Losses	Net gain/loss	Seats %	Votes %	Votes	+/−
Conservative									
Labour									
Green									
Residents									
Independent									
Reform									
