= 2027 Hart District Council election =

2027 English local government election

- 6 May 2027

11 out of 33 seats to Hart District Council 17 seats needed for a majority
Leader	David Neighbour	James Radley
Party	Liberal Democrats	CCH
Leader's seat	Yateley East	Church Crookham East
Last election	13 seats, 27.5%	11 seats, 14.3%
Current seats	13	11
Leader	Anne Crampton
Party	Conservative	Independent
Leader's seat	Hartley Wintney
Last election	8 seats, 25.6%	1 seat, 0.0%
Current seats	8	1
Incumbent Leader
David Neighbour
Liberal Democrats
No overall control (Note: Liberal Democrats–CCH coalition.)

The 2027 Hart District Council election will be held on 6 May 2027 to elect members of Hart District Council in Hampshire, England. This will be on the same day as other local elections held across the United Kingdom.

== Background ==
=== Local government reorganisation ===
Due to proposed structural changes to local government in England, the 2026 election was intended to be the final election to the council before it was abolished and replaced by North Hampshire Council, a new unitary authority.

However, on 7 September 2026, the government announced it was withdrawing plans for the planned restructuring pending review. Following this announcement, local elections due to be held in 2027 under the existing local electoral calendar would proceed.

== Summary ==
=== Election result ===
2027 Hart District Council election
Party	This election				Full council			This election		
Party	Candidates	Seats	Net	Seats %	Other	Total	Total %	Votes	Votes %	+/−
Liberal Democrats					9					
CCH					7					
Conservative					6					
Independent					0					

=== Incumbents ===
Ward	Incumbent councillor	Affiliation	Re-standing
Blackwater & Hawley	Robert Harwood	Liberal Democrats	
Crookham East	Chris Axam	CCH	
Crookham West & Ewshot	Tony Clarke	CCH	
Fleet Central	Katie Davies	CCH	
Fleet East	Peter Wildsmith	Liberal Democrats	
Fleet West	Ben Thomas	CCH	
Hartley Wintney	Spencer Farmer	Conservative	
Hook	Dermot Smith	Independent	
Odiham	Chris Dorn	Conservative	
Yateley East	David Neighbour	Liberal Democrats	
Yateley West	Alex Drage	Liberal Democrats	
