= 2027 Uttlesford District Council election =

2027 English local government election

- 6 May 2027

All 39 seats to Uttlesford District Council 20 seats needed for a majority
Leader	Petrina Lees	Ray Gooding	Geoffrey Sell
Party	R4U	Conservative	Liberal Democrats
Leader's seat	Elsenham & Henham	Stansted South & Birchanger	Stansted North
Last election	22 seats, 36.3%	11 seats, 30.7%	4 seats, 14.7%
Current seats	18	12	3
Leader	None	None
Party	Independent	Reform
Last election	2 seats, 4.5%	0 seats, 0.3%
Current seats	3 (Note: Of the 3 Independent councillors before the election, 2 sat in the Uttlesford Independents group and 1 was non-aligned.)	3
Incumbent Leader
Petrina Lees
R4U
No overall control (Note: R4U minority.)

The 2027 Uttlesford District Council election will be held on 6 May 2027 to elect members of Uttlesford District Council in Essex, England. This will be on the same day as other local elections held across the United Kingdom.

== Background ==
=== Local government reorganisation ===
Due to proposed structural changes to local government in England, the 2023 election would have been the final election to the council before it was abolished and replaced by West Essex Council, a unitary authority. However, on 7 September 2026, the government announced it was withdrawing plans for the planned restructuring pending review. Following this announcement, local elections due to be held in 2027 under the existing local electoral calendar would proceed.

== Summary ==
=== Election result ===
2027 Uttlesford District Council election
Party	Candidates	Seats	Gains	Losses	Net gain/loss	Seats %	Votes %	Votes	+/−
R4U									
Conservative									
Liberal Democrats									
Independent									
Reform									
