= 2027 Horsham District Council election =

2027 English local government election

- 6 May 2027

All 48 seats to Horsham District Council 25 seats needed for a majority
Leader	Martin Boffey	Roger Noel	Victoria Finnegan / Gill Perry
Party	Liberal Democrats	Conservative	Green
Leader's seat	Trafalgar	Bramber, Upper Beeding & Woodmancote	Steyning & Ashurst / Henfield
Last election	28 seats, 35.5%	11 seats, 33.8%	8 seats, 20.0%
Current seats	25	12	9
Leader		Tony Hogben
Party	Independent	Reform
Leader's seat		Colgate & Rusper
Last election	1 seat, 0.7%	0 seats, 0.3%
Current seats	1	1
Incumbent Leader
Martin Boffey
Liberal Democrats

The 2027 Horsham District Council election will be held on 6 May 2027 to elect members of Horsham District Council in West Sussex, England. This will be on the same day as other local elections held across the United Kingdom.

== Background ==
=== Local government reorganisation ===
Due to proposed structural changes to local government in England, the 2023 election would have been the final election to the council before it was abolished and replaced by a new unitary authority, although the structure of this new authority was yet to be decided. However, on 7 September 2026, the government announced it was withdrawing plans for the planned restructuring pending review. Following this announcement, local elections due to be held in 2027 under the existing local electoral calendar would proceed.

== Summary ==
=== Election result ===
2027 Horsham District Council election
Party	Candidates	Seats	Gains	Losses	Net gain/loss	Seats %	Votes %	Votes	+/−
Liberal Democrats		25 (Note: Current seats.)							
Conservative		12							
Green		9							
Independent		1							
Reform		1							
