= 2027 Tonbridge and Malling Borough Council election =

2027 English local government election

2027 Tonbridge & Malling Borough Council election
- 6 May 2027

All 44 seats to Tonbridge & Malling Borough Council 23 seats needed for a majority
Leader	Matt Boughton	Anita Oakley	Lee Athwal
Party	Conservative	Liberal Democrats	Green
Leader's seat	East & West Peckham, Mereworth & Wateringbury	Larkfield	Higham
Last election	20 seats, 40.2%	11 seats, 24.6%	8 seats, 20.7%
Current seats	21	11	8
Leader	Paul Hickmott	Mike Taylor
Party	Labour	Ind. Alliance
Leader's seat	Snodland West & Holborough Lakes	Borough Green & Platt
Last election	3 seats, 7.9%	2 seats, 5.6%
Current seats	2	2
Incumbent Leader
Matt Boughton
Conservative
No overall control (Note: Conservative–Independent Alliance (Kent) coalition.)

The 2027 Tonbridge & Malling Borough Council election will be held on 6 May 2027 to elect members of Tonbridge & Malling Borough Council in Kent, England. This will be on the same day as other local elections held across the United Kingdom.

== Background ==
=== Local government reorganisation ===
Due to proposed structural changes to local government in England, the 2023 election would have been the final election to the council before it was abolished and replaced by West Kent Council, a new unitary authority. However, on 7 September 2026, the government announced it was withdrawing plans for the planned restructuring pending review. Following this announcement, local elections due to be held in 2027 under the existing local electoral calendar would proceed.

== Summary ==
=== Election result ===
2027 Tonbridge & Malling Borough Council election
Party	Candidates	Seats	Gains	Losses	Net gain/loss	Seats %	Votes %	Votes	+/−
Conservative		21 (Note: Current seats.)							
Liberal Democrats		11							
Green		8							
Labour		2							
Independent Alliance (Kent)		2							
