= 2027 Dacorum Borough Council election =

2027 English local government election

- 6 May 2027

All 51 seats to Dacorum Borough Council 26 seats needed for a majority
Leader	Sally Symington	Andrew Williams
Party	Liberal Democrats	Conservative
Leader's seat	Berkhamstead West	Adeyfield East
Last election	28 seats, 42.3%	18 seats, 34.8%
Current seats	19	18
Leader		Angela Mitchell
Party	Independent	Labour
Leader's seat		Gadebridge
Last election	2 seats, 1.4%	3 seats, 17.8%
Current seats	10	4
Incumbent Leader
Sally Symington
Liberal Democrats
No overall control (Note: Liberal Democrats minority.)

The 2027 Dacorum Borough Council election will be held on 6 May 2027 to elect members of Dacorum Borough Council in Hertfordshire, England. This will be on the same day as other local elections held across the United Kingdom.

== Background ==
=== Local government reorganisation ===
Due to proposed structural changes to local government in England, the 2023 election was intended to be/would have been the final election to the council before it was abolished and replaced by West Hertfordshire Council, a new unitary authority. However, on 7 September 2026, the government announced it was withdrawing plans for the planned restructuring pending review. Following this announcement, local elections due to be held in 2027 under the existing local electoral calendar would proceed.

== Summary ==
=== Election result ===
2027 Dacorum Borough Council election
Party	Candidates	Seats	Gains	Losses	Net gain/loss	Seats %	Votes %	Votes	+/−
Liberal Democrats		19 (Note: Current seats.)							
Conservative		18							
Independent		10							
Labour		4							
