= 2027 Lewes District Council election =

2027 English local government election

- 6 May 2027

All 41 seats to Lewes District Council 21 seats needed for a majority
Leader	Zoe Nicholson	Stephen Gauntlett
Party	Green	Liberal Democrats
Leader's seat	Lewes Bridge	Seaford Central
Last election	17 seats, 31.8%	15 seats, 28.0%
Current seats	18	14
Leader	Chris Collier
Party	Labour	Independent
Leader's seat	Peacehaven West
Last election	9 seats, 16.7%	0 seats, 1.2%
Current seats	8	1
Incumbent Leader
Zoe Nicholson
Green
No overall control (Note: Green–Labour coalition.)

The 2027 Lewes District Council election will be held on 6 May 2027 to elect members of Lewes District Council in East Sussex, England. This will be on the same day as other local elections held across the United Kingdom.

== Background ==
=== Local government reorganisation ===
Due to proposed structural changes to local government in England, the 2023 election would have been the final election to the council before it was abolished and replaced by East Sussex Council, a new unitary authority. However, on 7 September 2026, the government announced it was withdrawing plans for the planned restructuring pending review. Following this announcement, local elections due to be held in 2027 under the existing local electoral calendar would proceed.

== Summary ==
=== Election result ===
2027 Lewes District Council election
Party	Candidates	Seats	Gains	Losses	Net gain/loss	Seats %	Votes %	Votes	+/−
Green		18 (Note: Current seats.)							
Liberal Democrats		14							
Labour		8							
Independent		1							
