= 2027 Cambridge City Council election =

2027 English local government election

- 6 May 2027

14 out of 42 seats to Cambridge City Council 22 seats needed for a majority
Leader	Katie Thornburrow	Sefira Davison
Party	Labour	Green
Leader's seat	Petersfield	Arbury
Last election	17 seats, 25.3%	12 seats, 32.6%
Current seats	17	13
Leader	Tim Bick	Delowar Hossain
Party	Liberal Democrats	Conservative
Leader's seat	Market	King's Hedges
Last election	11 seats, 24.1%	1 seat, 7.8%
Current seats	11	1
Incumbent Leader
Katie Thornburrow
Labour
No overall control (Note: Labour minority.)

The 2027 Cambridge City Council election will be held on 6 May 2027 to elect members of Cambridge City Council in Cambridgeshire, England. This will be on the same day as other local elections held across the United Kingdom.

== Background ==
=== Local government reorganisation ===
Due to proposed structural changes to local government in England, the 2026 election was intended to be the final election to the council before it was abolished and replaced by a unitary authority. However, on 7 September 2026, the government announced it was withdrawing plans for the planned restructuring pending review. Following this announcement, local elections due to be held in 2027 under the existing local electoral calendar would proceed.

== Summary ==
=== Election result ===
2027 Cambridge City Council election
Party	This election				Full council			This election		
Party	Candidates	Seats	Net	Seats %	Other	Total	Total %	Votes	Votes %	+/−
Labour					11					
Green					10					
Liberal Democrats					7					
Conservative					0					

=== Incumbents ===
Ward	Incumbent councillor	Affiliation	Re-standing
Abbey	Elliot Tong	Independent	
Arbury	Mike Todd-Jones	Labour	
Castle	Cheney Payne	Liberal Democrats	
Cherry Hinton	Robert Dryden	Independent	
Coleridge	Rosy Moore	Labour	
East Chesterton	Bob Illingworth	Liberal Democrats	
King's Hedges	Delowar Hossain	Conservative	
Market	Anthony Martinelli	Liberal Democrats	
Newnham	Jean Glasberg	Green	
Petersfield	Katie Thornburrow	Labour	
Queen Edith's	Karen Young	Liberal Democrats	
Romsey	Beth Gardiner-Smith	Labour	
Trumpington	Ingrid Flaubert (Note: Originally elected as a Liberal Democrat, but later defected to the Green Party.)	Green	
West Chesterton	Rachel Wade	Labour	
