= 2027 Worthing Borough Council election =

2027 English local government election

- 6 May 2027

11 out of 37 seats to Worthing Borough Council 19 seats needed for a majority
Leader	Caroline Baxter	Claire Hunt (Note: Leader of the Green & Independent Alliance group.)	Kevin Jenkins
Party	Labour	Green	Conservative
Leader's seat	Central	Goring	Gaisford
Last election	15 seats, 22.5%	8 seats, 23.7%	6 seats, 18.4%
Current seats	15	8	6
Leader		Claire Hunt	Hazel Thorpe
Party	Reform	Independent	Liberal Democrats
Leader's seat		Goring	Tarring
Last election	5 seats, 26.9%	2 seats, 0.0%	1 seat, 8.6%
Current seats	5	2	1
Incumbent Leader
Caroline Baxter
Labour
No overall control (Note: Labour minority.)

The 2027 Worthing Borough Council election will be held on 6 May 2027 to elect members of Worthing Borough Council in West Sussex, England. This will be on the same day as other local elections held across the United Kingdom.

== Background ==
=== Local government reorganisation ===
Due to proposed structural changes to local government in England, the 2026 election was intended to be the final election to the council before it was abolished and replaced by a new unitary authority, although the structure of this new authority was yet to be decided.

However, on 7 September 2026, the government announced it was withdrawing plans for the planned restructuring pending review. Following this announcement, local elections due to be held in 2027 under the existing local electoral calendar would proceed.

== Summary ==
=== Election result ===
2027 Worthing Borough Council election
Party	This election				Full council			This election		
Party	Candidates	Seats	Net	Seats %	Other	Total	Total %	Votes	Votes %	+/−
Labour					9					
Green					7					
Conservative					4					
Reform					5					
Independent					0					
Liberal Democrats					1					

=== Incumbents ===
Ward	Incumbent councillor	Affiliation	Re-standing
Broadwater	Dawn Smith	Labour	
Castle	Sophie Cox	Labour	
Central	Caroline Baxter	Labour	
Gaisford	Ferdousi Chowdhury	Labour	
Goring	Claire Hunt	Green	
Heene	Helen Abrahams	Labour	
Marine	Vicki Wells	Labour	
Offington	Daniel Humphreys	Conservative	
Salvington	Noel Atkins	Conservative	
Selden	Carl Walker	Independent	
Tarring	Hilary Schan	Independent	
