= 2027 Mid Suffolk District Council election =

2027 English local government election

- 6 May 2027

All 34 seats to Mid Suffolk District Council 18 seats needed for a majority
Leader	Andy Mellen
Party	Green	Liberal Democrats
Leader's seat	Bacton
Last election	24 seats, 56.8%	4 seats, 10.9%
Current seats	23	4
Leader	John Whitehead
Party	Independent	Conservative
Leader's seat	Claydon & Barham
Last election	Did not stand	6 seats, 28.0%
Current seats	4 (Note: The 4 Independents sitting before the election form the Mid Suffolk Independents group.)	3 (Note: One Conservative councillor, Gilly Morgan, is listed as sitting in the Conservative & Independent group on the council's website.)
Incumbent Leader
Andrew Mellen
Green

The 2027 Mid Suffolk District Council election will be held on 6 May 2027 to elect members of Mid Suffolk District Council in county, England. This will be on the same day as other local elections held across the United Kingdom.

== Background ==
=== Local government reorganisation ===
Due to proposed structural changes to local government in England, the 2023 election would have been the final election to the council before it was abolished and replaced by Central & East Suffolk Council and West Suffolk Council, both unitary authorities. However, on 7 September 2026, the government announced it was withdrawing plans for the planned restructuring pending review. Following this announcement, local elections due to be held in 2027 under the existing local electoral calendar would proceed.

== Summary ==
=== Election result ===
2027 Mid Suffolk District Council election
Party	Candidates	Seats	Gains	Losses	Net gain/loss	Seats %	Votes %	Votes	+/−
Green		23 (Note: Current seats.)							
Liberal Democrats		4							
Independent		4							
Conservative		3							
