= 2027 Southampton City Council election =

2027 English local government election

- 6 May 2027

17 out of 51 seats to Southampton City Council 26 seats needed for a majority
| Leader | Sarah Bogle | Sarah Powell-Vaughan | Richard Blackman |
| Party | Labour | Reform | Liberal Democrats |
| Leader's seat | Bargate | Sholing | Bassett |
| Last election | 24 seats, 21.3% | 8 seats, 25.7% | 7 seats, 14.1% |
| Current seats | 24 | 8 | 8 |
| Leader | Peter Baillie | Matt Renyard |
| Party | Conservative | Green |
| Leader's seat | Harefield | Coxford |
| Last election | 6 seats, 16.7% | 6 seats, 19.7% |
| Current seats | 6 | 5 |
Incumbent Leader
Sarah Bogle
Labour
No overall control (Note: Labour minority.)

The 2027 Southampton City Council election will be held on 6 May 2027 to elect members of Southampton City Council in Hampshire, England. This will be on the same day as other local elections held across the United Kingdom.

== Background ==
=== Local government reorganisation ===
Due to proposed structural changes to local government in England, the 2026 election was intended to be the final election to the council before it was abolished and replaced by South West Hampshire Council, a new unitary authority.

However, on 7 September 2026, the government announced it was withdrawing plans for the planned restructuring pending review. Following this announcement, local elections due to be held in 2027 under the existing local electoral calendar would proceed.

== Summary ==
=== Election result ===
2027 Southampton City Council election
| Party | This election | | | | Full council | | | This election | | |
| Party | Candidates | Seats | Net | Seats % | Other | Total | Total % | Votes | Votes % | +/− |
|---|---|---|---|---|---|---|---|---|---|---|
| Labour | | | | | 14 | | | | | |
| Reform | | | | | 8 | | | | | |
| Liberal Democrats | | | | | 5 | | | | | |
| Green | | | | | 4 | | | | | |
| Conservative | | | | | 3 | | | | | |

=== Incumbents ===
| Ward | Incumbent councillor | Affiliation | Re-standing |
|---|---|---|---|
| Banister & Polygon | Pay Evemy | Labour | |
| Bargate | Sarah Bogle | Labour | |
| Bassett | Richard Blackman | Liberal Democrats | |
| Bevois | Toqeer Kataria | Labour | |
| Bitterne Park | Amanda Barnes-Andrews | Labour | |
| Coxford | Rececca McCreanor | Liberal Democrats | |
| Freemantle | Dave Shields | Labour | |
| Harefield | Peter Baillie | Conservative | |
| Millbrook | Steven Galton | Conservative | |
| Peartree | Eamonn Keogh | Labour | |
| Portswood | Kat Barbour | Green | |
| Redbridge | Sally Goodfellow | Labour | |
| Shirley | Chris Shank | Liberal Democrats | |
| Sholing | James Baillie | Conservative | |
| Swaythling | Lorna Fielker | Labour | |
| Thornhill | Yvonne Frampton | Labour | |
| Woolston | Warwick Payne | Labour | |
