= 2027 Broadland District Council election =

2027 English local government election

- 6 May 2027

All 47 seats to Broadland District Council 24 seats needed for a majority
| Leader | Fran Whymark | Sue Holland | Natasha Harpley |
| Party | Conservative | Liberal Democrats | Labour |
| Leader's seat | Wroxham | Spixworth St Faiths | Sprowston Central |
| Last election | 21 seats, 38.2% | 14 seats, 24.3% | 8 seats, 26.4% |
| Current seats | 19 | 14 | 7 |
| Leader | Jan Davis | | James Lee |
| Party | Green | Independent | Reform |
| Leader's seat | Brundall | | Acle |
| Last election | 4 seats, 10.4% | Did not stand | 0 seats, 0.6% |
| Current seats | 4 | 2 (Note: Of the 2 Independent councillors before the election, 1 was listed as an Independent Conservative and 1 was non-aligned.) | 1 |
Incumbent Leader
Sue Holland
Liberal Democrats
No overall control (Note: Liberal Democrats–Labour–Green coalition.)

The 2027 Broadland District Council election will be held on 6 May 2027 to elect members of Broadland District Council in Norfolk, England. This will be on the same day as other local elections held across the United Kingdom.

== Background ==
=== Local government reorganisation ===
Due to proposed structural changes to local government in England, the 2023 election was intended to be/would have been the final election to the council before it was abolished and replaced by West Norfolk Council, a unitary authority. However, on 7 September 2026, the government announced it was withdrawing plans for the planned restructuring pending review. Following this announcement, local elections due to be held in 2027 under the existing local electoral calendar would proceed.

== Summary ==
=== Election result ===
2027 Broadland District Council election
| Party | Candidates | Seats | Gains | Losses | Net gain/loss | Seats % | Votes % | Votes | +/− |
|---|---|---|---|---|---|---|---|---|---|
| Conservative | | 19 (Note: Current seats.) | | | | | | | |
| Liberal Democrats | | 14 | | | | | | | |
| Labour | | 8 | | | | | | | |
| Green | | 4 | | | | | | | |
| Independent | | 2 | | | | | | | |
| Reform | | 1 | | | | | | | |
