= 2027 Wealden District Council election =

2027 English local government election

- 6 May 2027

All 45 seats to Wealden District Council 23 seats needed for a majority
Leader	James Partridge	Rachel Millward	(Note: David White is the leader of the Independent group. Stephen Shing is the leader of the Independent Democrats group.)
Party	Liberal Democrats	Green	Independent
Leader's seat	Crowborough North	Hartfield	(Note: David White is a sitting councillor for Hellingly. Stephen Shing is a sitting councillor for Polegate North.)
Last election	13 seats, 18.5%	11 seats, 21.6%	10 seats, 15.4%
Current seats	11	11	10 (Note: Of the 10 Independent councillors sitting prior to the election 6 sat in the Independent group and 4 sat in the Independent Democrats group.)
Leader	Ann Newton	Daniel Manvell
Party	Conservative	Labour	Reform
Leader's seat	Framfield & Cross-in-Hand with Blackboys	Uckfield North
Last election	9 seats, 35.0%	2 seats, 8.6%	0 seats, 0.2%
Current seats	9	2	2
Incumbent Leader
Rachel Millward
Green
No overall control (Note: Green–Liberal Democrats coalition.)

The 2027 Wealden District Council election will be held on 6 May 2027 to elect members of Wealden District Council in East Sussex, England. This will be on the same day as other local elections held across the United Kingdom.

== Background ==
=== Local government reorganisation ===
Due to proposed structural changes to local government in England, the 2023 election would have been the final election to the council before it was abolished and replaced by East Sussex Council, a new unitary authority. However, on 7 September 2026, the government announced it was withdrawing plans for the planned restructuring pending review. Following this announcement, local elections due to be held in 2027 under the existing local electoral calendar would proceed.

== Summary ==
=== Election result ===
2027 Wealden District Council election
Party	Candidates	Seats	Gains	Losses	Net gain/loss	Seats %	Votes %	Votes	+/−
Liberal Democrats		12 (Note: Current seats.)							
Green		10							
Independent		10							
Conservative		9							
Labour		2							
Reform		2							
