= 2027 Amber Valley Borough Council election =

2027 English local election

2027 Amber Valley Borough Council Election
- 6 May 2027

All 42 seats for Amber Valley Borough Council 22 seats needed for a majority

Leader	Chris Emmas-Williams	Tony Harper	Alison McDermott
Party	Labour	Conservative	Green
Last election	26 seats,	7 seats	6 seats
Current seats	19	7	6
Seats needed	▲3	▲15	▲16
Leader	No Leader	James Kerry	Ben Bellamy
Party	Independent	Reform	Derbyshire Community Party
Last election	0 seats	0 seats	2 seats
Current seats	4	3	2
Seats needed	▲18	▲19	▲20
Leader	Kate Smith
Party	Liberal Democrats
Last election	1 seats
Current seats	1
Seats needed	▲21
Incumbent Leader
Chris Emmas-Williams
Labour

The 2027 Amber Valley Borough Council election will be held on 6 May 2027, alongside other local elections in the United Kingdom, to elect all 42 councillors for Amber Valley Borough Council.

== Background ==
The election was not scheduled to be held as Amber Valley, along with many other councils in England, were to be re-organised under the government's Local Government Re-Organisation scheme. Due to the pausing of the re-organisation on 7 September, the existing council boundaries will be used.

Labour currently controls the council through a minority administration, lead by Chris Emmas-Williams. Labour won majority control in the 2023 elections, however defections have resulted in minority rule.

Each of the 18 wards of the council elects either two or three councillors, depending on their relative populations.

=== Previous Election Result ===
The composition of the council after the 2023 election was:

2023 Result
Party	Seats Won	Net Gain/Loss
Labour	26	▲15
Conservative	7	▼21
Green	6	▲3
Independents	2	▲2
Liberal Democrat	1	▲1
Reform UK	0	0
