= 2027 East Cambridgeshire District Council election =

2027 English local government election

- 6 May 2027

All 28 seats to East Cambridgeshire District Council 15 seats needed for a majority
Leader	Anna Bailey	Lorna Dupré
Party	Conservative	Liberal Democrats	Independent
Leader's seat	Downham Villages	Sutton
Last election	15 seats, 38.4%	13 seats, 39.7%	0 seats, 2.6%
Current seats	15	12	1
Incumbent Leader
Anna Bailey
Conservative

The 2027 East Cambridgeshire Council election will be held on 6 May 2027 to elect members of East Cambridgeshire District Council in Cambridgeshire, England. This will be on the same day as other local elections held across the United Kingdom.

== Background ==
=== Local government reorganisation ===
Due to proposed structural changes to local government in England, the 2023 election would have been the final election to the council before it was abolished and replaced by a new unitary authority. However, on 7 September 2026, the government announced it was withdrawing plans for the planned restructuring pending review. Following this announcement, local elections due to be held in 2027 under the existing local electoral calendar would proceed.

== Summary ==
=== Election result ===
2027 East Cambridgeshire District Council election
Party	Candidates	Seats	Gains	Losses	Net gain/loss	Seats %	Votes %	Votes	+/−
Conservative		15 (Note: Current seats.)							
Liberal Democrats		12							
Independent		1							
