= 2027 Three Rivers District Council election =

2027 English local government election

- 6 May 2027

13 out of 39 seats to Three Rivers District Council 20 seats needed for a majority
Leader	Stephen Giles-Medhurst	Oliver Cooper	Narinder Sian
Party	Liberal Democrats	Conservative	Green
Leader's seat	Leavesden	Chorleywood North & Sarratt	Dickinsons
Last election	18 seats, 25.7%	14 seats, 32.5%	3 seats, 12.9%
Current seats	18	14	3
Leader	Stephen Cox	Mike Sims
Party	Labour	Independent
Leader's seat	South Oxhey	Richmansworth Town
Last election	2 seats, 5.1%	2 seats, 2.1%
Current seats	2	2
Incumbent Leader
Stephen Giles-Medhurst
Liberal Democrats
No overall control (Note: Liberal Democrats minority.)

The 2027 Three Rivers District Council election will be held on 6 May 2027 to elect members of Three Rivers District Council in Hertfordshire, England. This will be on the same day as other local elections held across the United Kingdom.

== Background ==
=== Local government reorganisation ===
Due to proposed structural changes to local government in England, the 2026 election was intended to be the final election to the council before it was abolished and replaced by South West Hertfordshire Council, a new unitary authority. However, on 7 September 2026, the government announced it was withdrawing plans for the planned restructuring pending review. Following this announcement, local elections due to be held in 2027 under the existing local electoral calendar would proceed.

== Summary ==
=== Election result ===
2027 Three Rivers District Council election
Party	This election				Full council			This election		
Party	Candidates	Seats	Net	Seats %	Other	Total	Total %	Votes	Votes %	+/−
Liberal Democrats					11					
Conservative					12					
Green					2					
Labour					1					
Independent					0					

=== Incumbents ===
Ward	Incumbent councillor	Affiliation	Re-standing
Abbots Langeley & Bedmond	David Major	Liberal Democrats	
Carpenders Park	Ian Morris (Note: Originally elected as a Conservative, but later left the party to sit as an independent.)	Independent	
Chorleywood North & Sarratt	Oliver Cooper	Conservative	
Chorleywood South & Maple Cross	Raj Khiroya	Liberal Democrats	
Dickinsons	Narinder Sian	Green	
Durrants	Paul Rainbow	Liberal Democrats	
Gade Valley	Chris Whately-Smith	Liberal Democrats	
Leavesden	Jon Tankard	Liberal Democrats	
Moor Park & Eastbury	Reena Ranger	Conservative	
Oxhey Hall & Hayling	Keith Martin	Liberal Democrats	
Penn & Mill End	Tony Humphreys	Liberal Democrats	
Rickmansworth Town	Mike Sims	Independent	
South Oxhey	Stephen Cox	Labour	
