= 2027 Harlow District Council election =

2027 English local government election

- 6 May 2027

11 out of 33 seats to Harlow District Council 17 seats needed for a majority
Leader	Dan Swords	James Griggs	Paul Jago
Party	Conservative	Labour	Reform
Leader's seat	Church Langley North & Newhall	Netteswell	Mark Hall
Last election	22 seats, 56.7%	10 seats, 13.2%	1 seat, 20.2%
Current seats	22	10	1
Incumbent Leader
Dan Swords
Conservative

The 2027 Harlow District Council election will be held on 6 May 2027 to elect members of Harlow District Council in Essex, England. This will be on the same day as other local elections held across the United Kingdom.

== Background ==
=== Local government reorganisation ===
Due to proposed structural changes to local government in England, the 2026 election was intended to be the final election to the council before it was abolished and replaced by West Essex Council, a unitary authority. However, on 7 September 2026, the government announced it was withdrawing plans for the planned restructuring pending review. Following this announcement, local elections due to be held in 2027 under the existing local electoral calendar would proceed.

== Summary ==
=== Election result ===
2027 Harlow District Council election
Party	This election				Full council			This election		
Party	Candidates	Seats	Net	Seats %	Other	Total	Total %	Votes	Votes %	+/−
Conservative					16					
Labour					6					
Reform					0					

=== Incumbents ===
Ward	Incumbent councillor	Affiliation	Re-standing
Bush Fair	Kay Morrison	Labour	
Church Langley North & Newhall	Dan Swords	Conservative	
Church Langley South & Potter Street	Danielle Brown	Conservative	
Great Parndon	Hannah Ellis	Conservative	
Latton Bush & Stewards	Alastair Gunn	Conservative	
Little Parndon & Town Centre	Tony Durcan	Labour	
Mark Hall	Paul Jago (Note: Elected at the 2025 Mark Hall by-election.)	Reform	
Netteswell	Nancy Watson	Labour	
Old Harlow	Michael Garnett	Conservative	
Passmores	Daniella Pritchard	Labour	
Sumners & Kingsmoor	Clive Souter	Conservative	
