= 2027 Breckland District Council election =

2027 English local government election

- 6 May 2027

All 49 seats to Breckland District Council 25 seats needed for a majority
Leader	Sam Chapman-Allen	Kendra Cogman	Roger Atterwill (Note: Leader of the Independent & Green group.)
Party	Conservative	Labour	Independent
Leader's seat	Forest	Dereham - Toftwood	Lincoln
Last election	30 seats, 44.6%	12 seats, 28.0%	5 seats, 16.3%
Current seats	29	9	5 (Note: Of the 5 Independent councillors before the election, 3 sat in the Independent & Green group and 2 were non-aligned.)
Leader	Robin Hunter-Clarke	Roger Atterwill
Party	Reform	Green
Leader's seat	Hermitage	Lincoln
Last election	0 seats, 0.6%	1 seat, 4.5%
Current seats	5	1 (Note: The sole Green councillor sits in the Independent & Green group.)
Incumbent Leader
Sam Chapman-Allen
Conservative

The 2027 Breckland District Council election will be held on 6 May 2027 to elect members of Breckland District Council in Norfolk, England. This will be on the same day as other local elections held across the United Kingdom.

== Background ==
=== Local government reorganisation ===
Due to proposed structural changes to local government in England, the 2023 election would have been the final election to the council before it was abolished and replaced by West Norfolk Council, a unitary authority. However, on 7 September 2026, the government announced it was withdrawing plans for the planned restructuring pending review. Following this announcement, local elections due to be held in 2027 under the existing local electoral calendar would proceed.

== Summary ==
=== Election result ===
2027 Breckland District Council election
Party	Candidates	Seats	Gains	Losses	Net gain/loss	Seats %	Votes %	Votes	+/−
Conservative		29 (Note: Current seats.)							
Labour		9							
Independent		5							
Reform		5							
Green		1							
