= 2027 Central Bedfordshire Council election =

2027 English local government election

- 6 May 2027

All 63 seats to Central Bedfordshire Council 32 seats needed for a majority
Leader	(Note: Adam Zerny is the leader of the Independent Group. Hayley Whitaker is the leader of the Central Bedfordshire Community Network group.)	Richard Wenham	Shaun Roberts
Party	Independent	Conservative	Liberal Democrats
Leader's seat	(Note: Adam Zerny is a sitting councillor for Potton ward. Hayley Whitaker is a sitting councillors for Biggleswade West.)	Clifton, Henlow & Langford	Leighton Linslade South
Last election	27 seats, 32.7%	20 seats, 26.3%	10 seats, 15.0%
Current seats	28 (Note: Of the 28 Independent councillors sitting prior to the election, 17 sat in the Independent Group, 10 sat in the Central Bedfordshire Community Network group, and 1 was non-aligned.)	20	8
Leader	Matthew Brennan		Hayley Whitaker (Note: Leader of the Central Bedfordshire Community Network.)
Party	Labour	Reform	Green
Leader's seat	Dunstable North		Biggleswade West
Last election	5 seats, 18.6%	0 seats, 1.3%	1 seat, 6.0%
Current seats	4	2	1 (Note: The sole Green councillor sits in the Central Bedfordshire Community Network group.)
Incumbent Leader
Adam Zerny
Independent
No overall control (Note: Independent minority.)

The 2027 Central Bedfordshire Council election will be held on 6 May 2027 to elect members of Central Bedfordshire Council in Bedfordshire, England. This will be on the same day as other local elections held across the United Kingdom.

== Summary ==
=== Election result ===
2027 Central Bedfordshire Council election
Party	Candidates	Seats	Gains	Losses	Net gain/loss	Seats %	Votes %	Votes	+/−
Independent		28 (Note: Current seats.)							
Conservative		20							
Liberal Democrats		8							
Labour		4							
Reform		2							
Green		1							
