= 2027 Broxbourne Borough Council election =

2027 English local government election

- 6 May 2027

10 out of 30 seats to Broxbourne Borough Council 16 seats needed for a majority
Leader	Corina Gander	Carol Bowman	Siobhan Monaghan
Party	Conservative	Labour	Reform
Leader's seat	Goffs Oak	Walthams Cross	Cheshunt South & Theobalds
Last election	25 seats, 39.6%	3 seats, 11.2%	2 seats, 33.5%
Current seats	25	3	2
Incumbent Leader
Corina Gander
Conservative

The 2027 Broxbourne Borough Council election will be held on 6 May 2027 to elect members of Broxbourne Borough Council in Hertfordshire, England. This will be on the same day as other local elections held across the United Kingdom.

== Background ==
=== Local government reorganisation ===
Due to proposed structural changes to local government in England, the 2026 election was intended to be the final election to the council before it was abolished and replaced by East Hertfordshire & Broxbourne Council, a new unitary authority. However, on 7 September 2026, the government announced it was withdrawing plans for the planned restructuring pending review. Following this announcement, local elections due to be held in 2027 under the existing local electoral calendar would proceed.

== Summary ==
=== Election result ===
2027 Broxbourne Borough Council election
Party	This election				Full council			This election		
Party	Candidates	Seats	Net	Seats %	Other	Total	Total %	Votes	Votes %	+/−
Conservative					26					
Labour					2					
Reform					2					

=== Incumbents ===
Ward	Incumbent councillor	Affiliation	Re-standing
Broxbourne & Hoddesdon South	Paul Mason	Conservative	
Cheshunt North	Sacha Kanatli	Conservative	
Cheshunt South & Theobalds	Tony Siracusa	Conservative	
Flamstead End	Paul Seeby	Conservative	
Goffs Oak	Corina Gander	Conservative	
Hoddesdon North	Steve Wortley	Conservative	
Hoddesdon Town & Rye Park	Alexander Curtis	Conservative	
Rosedale & Bury Green	Martin Greensmyth	Conservative	
Waltham Cross	Selina Norgrove	Labour	
Wormley & Turnford	Gordon Nicholson	Conservative	
