= 2027 United Kingdom local elections =

Elections to local councils and mayoralties

- 6 May 2027
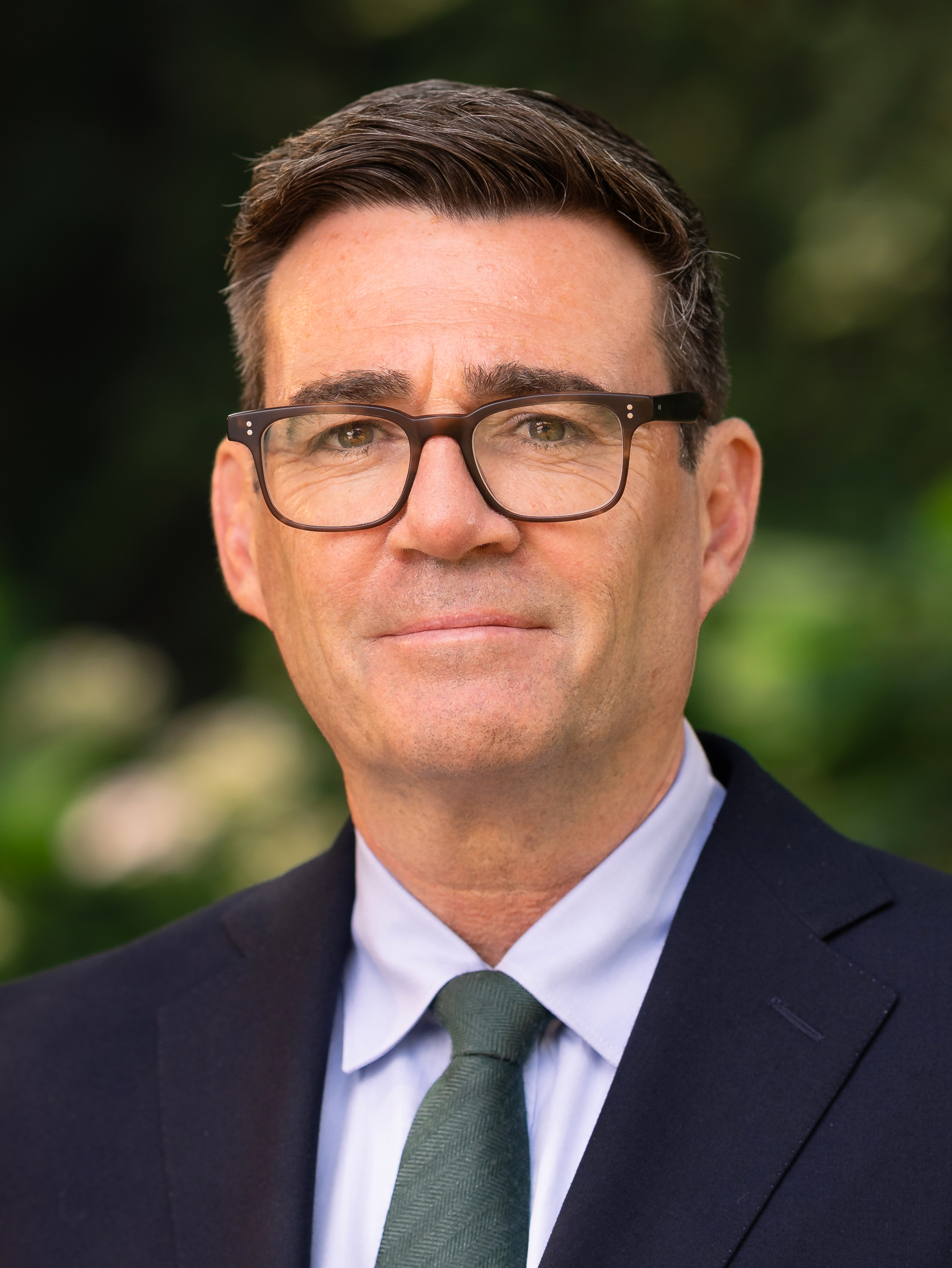

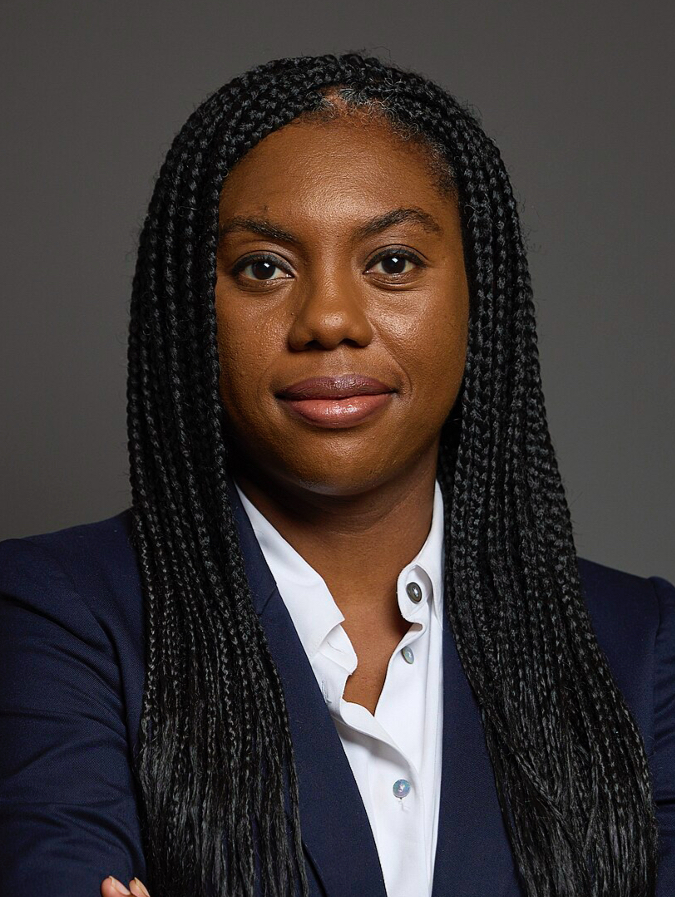

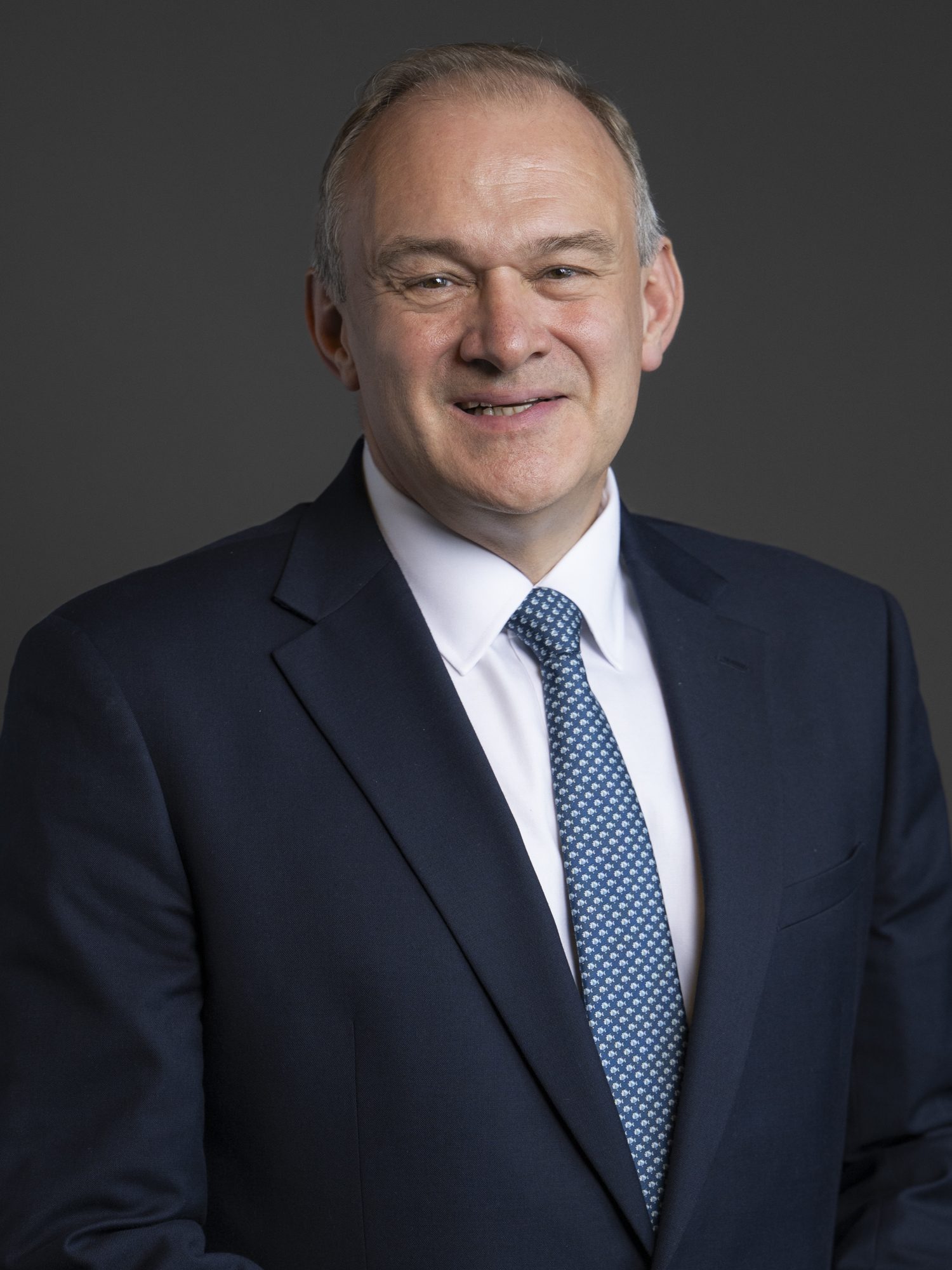

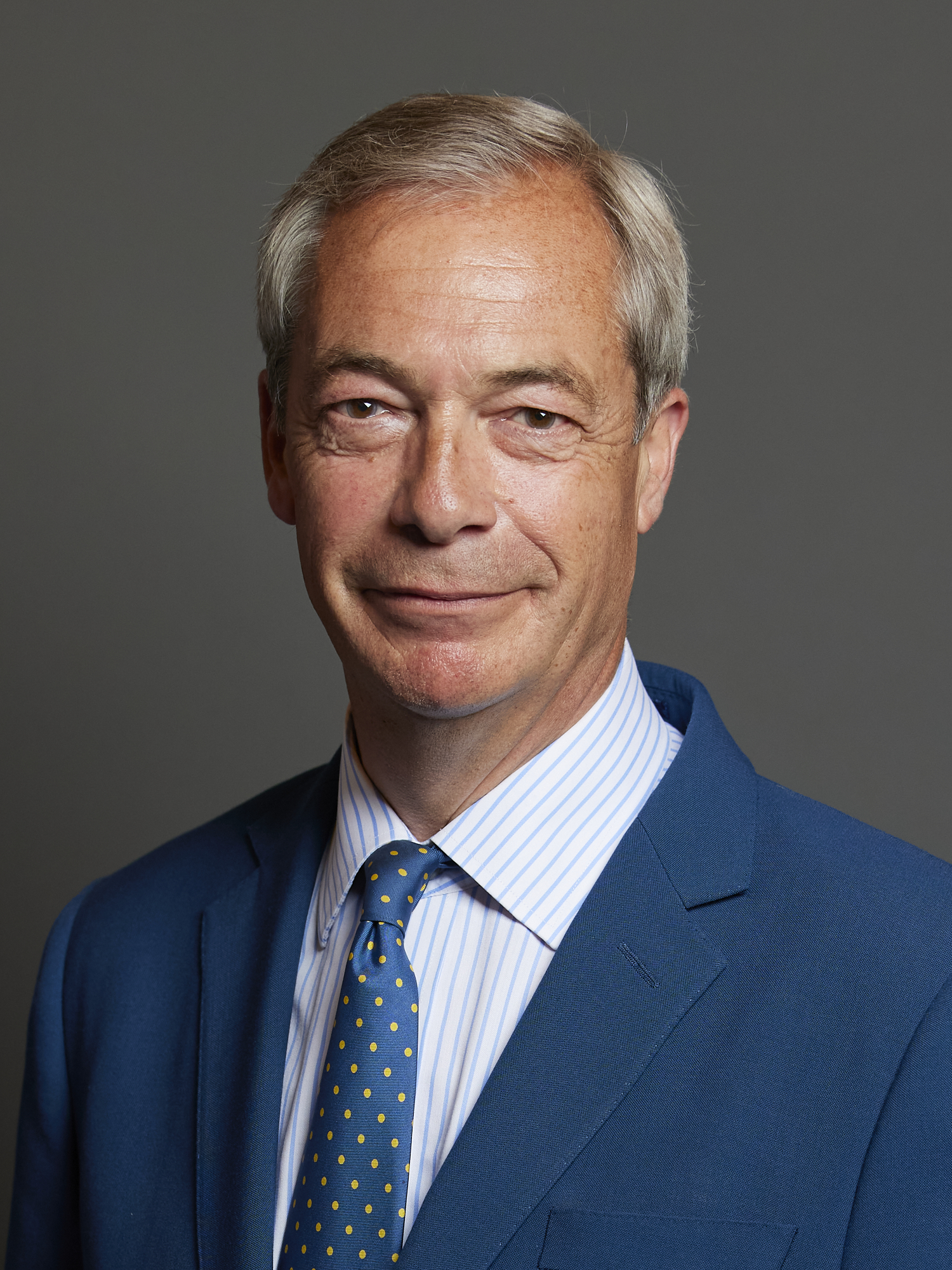

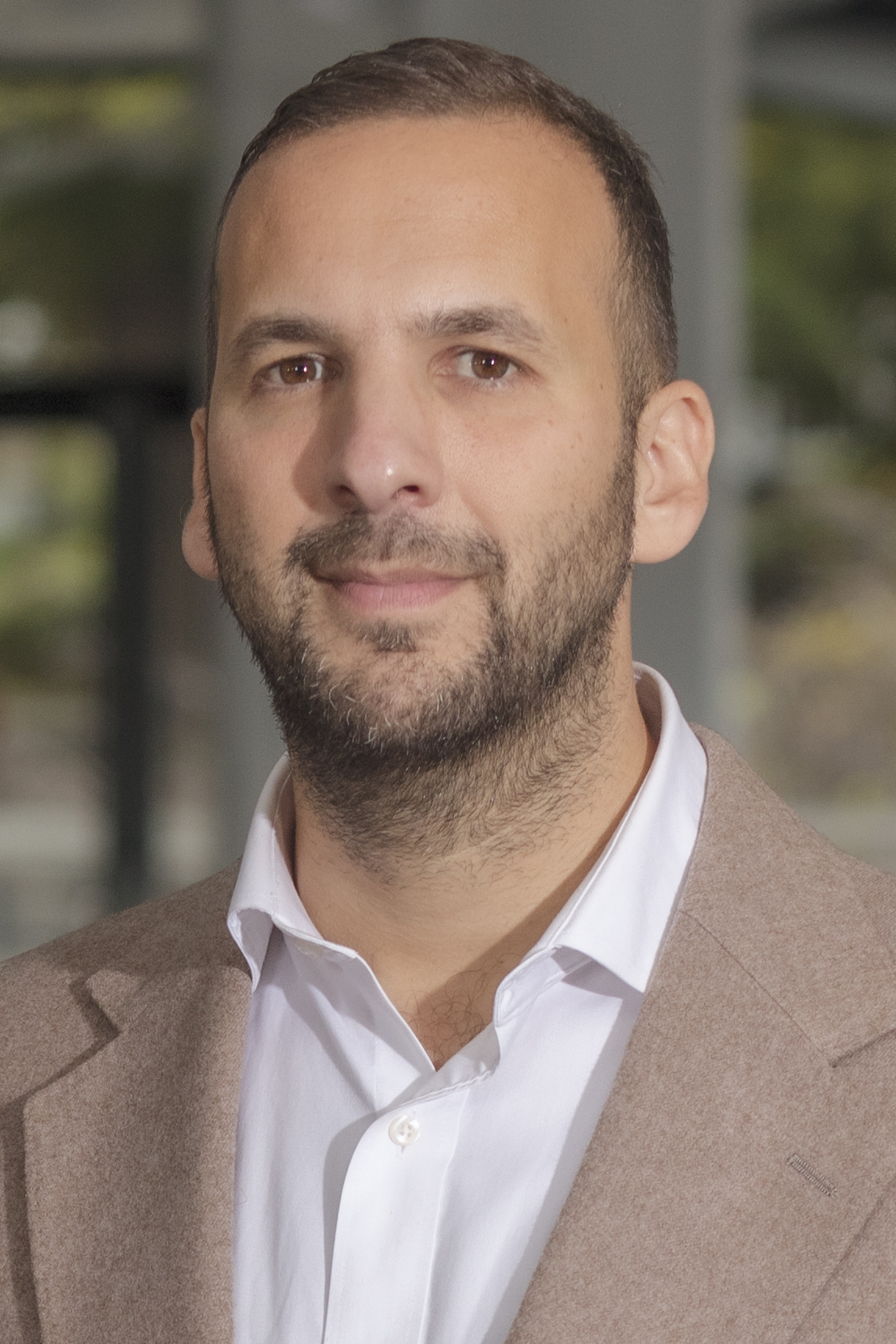

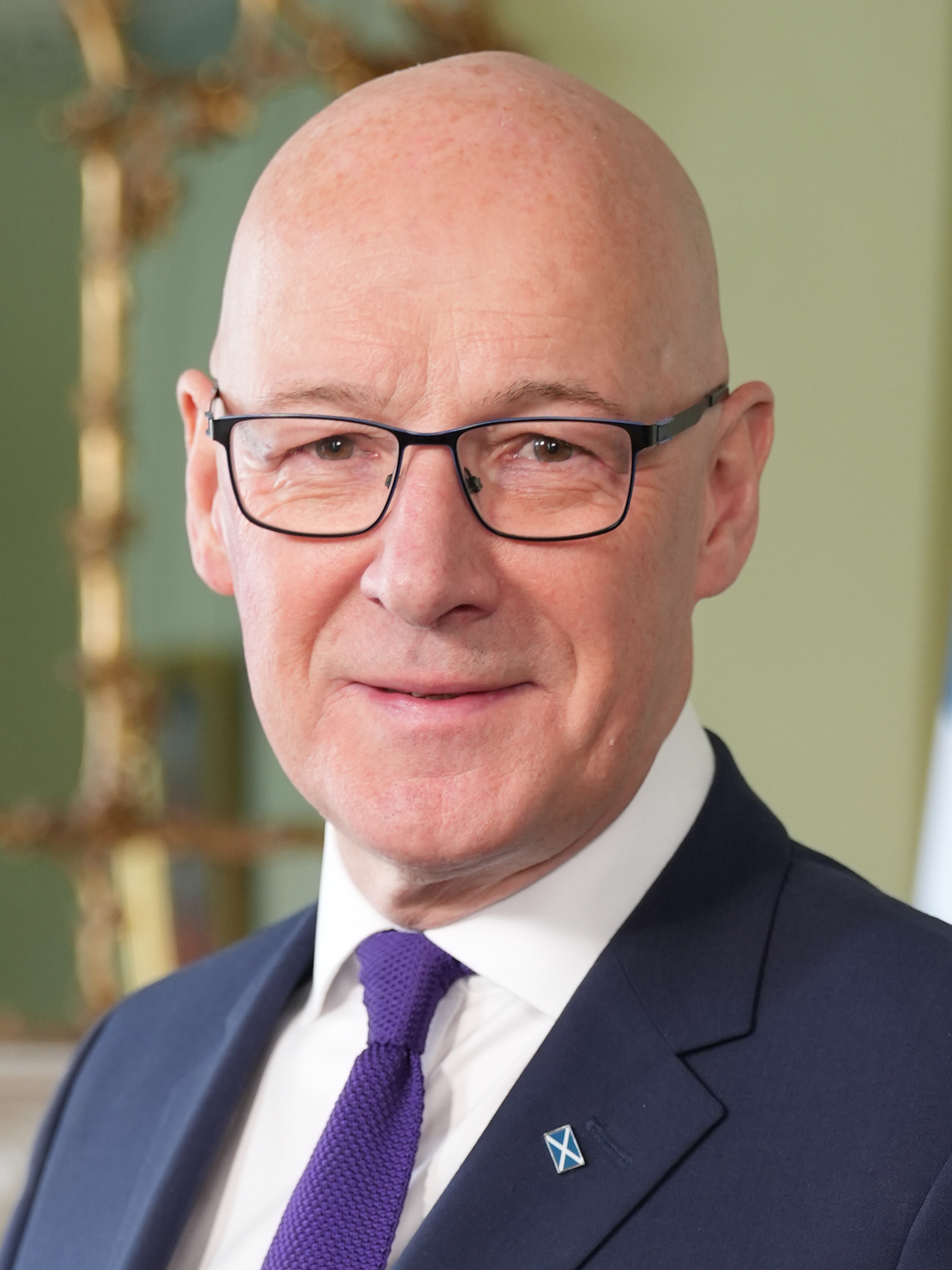

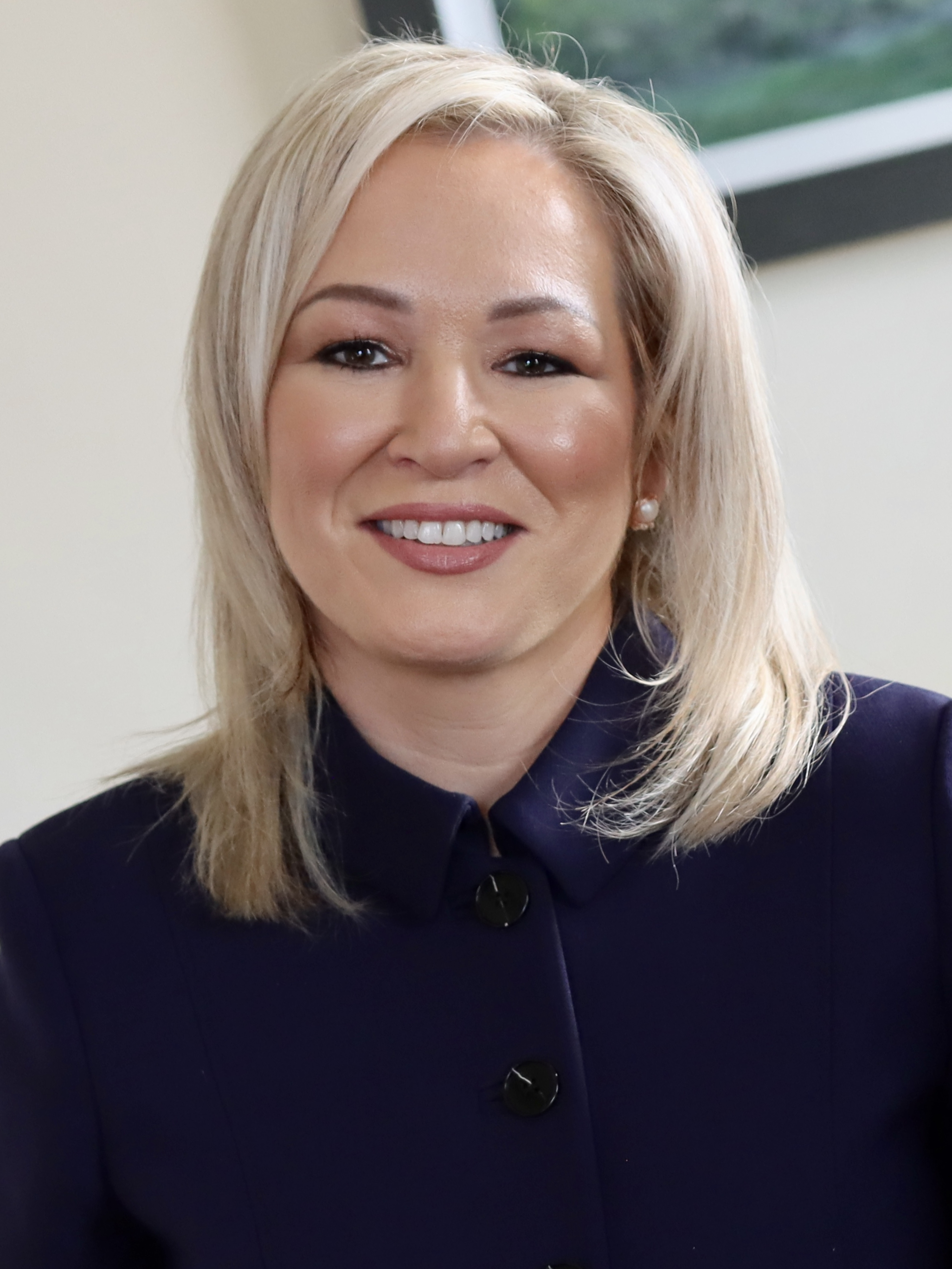

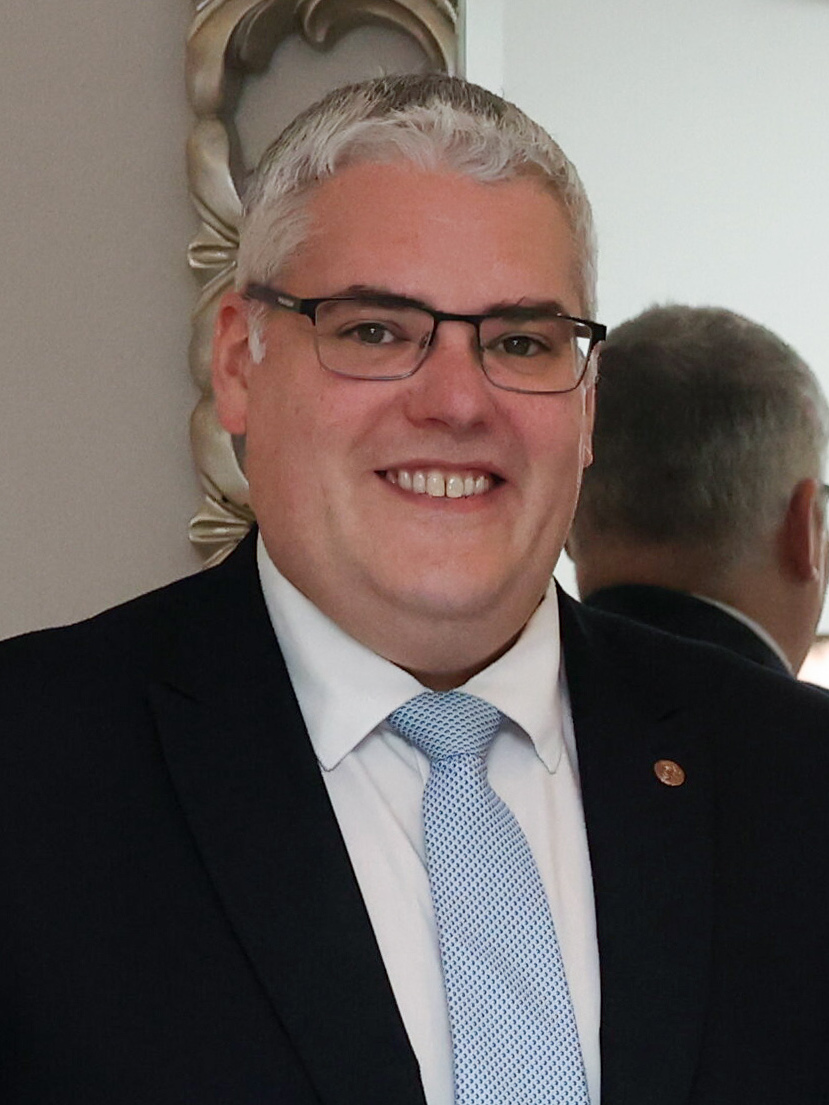
Leader	Andy Burnham	Kemi Badenoch	Ed Davey
Party	Labour	Conservative	Liberal Democrats
Leader since	17 July 2026	2 November 2024	27 August 2020
Current seats	4,581 seats 3,014 up for election	3,861 seats 2,513 up for election	3,355 seats 1,699 up for election
Leader	Nigel Farage	Zack Polanski	John Swinney
Party	Reform	Green (E&W)	SNP
Leader since	3 June 2024	2 September 2025	6 May 2024
Current seats	2,293 seats 212 up for election	1,300 seats 528 up for election	413 seats All up for election
Leader	Rhun ap Iorwerth	Michelle O'Neill (Note: The leader of Sinn Féin is Mary Lou McDonald, who sits as a TD in the Irish Dáil Éireann for Dublin Central. O'Neill is the leader of the party in Northern Ireland.)	Gavin Robinson
Party	Plaid Cymru	Sinn Féin	DUP
Leader since	16 June 2023	23 January 2017 (Note: As "Party leader in the North")	29 May 2024
Last election	203 seats All up for election	144 seats All up for election	119 seats All up for election
- Local authorities with planned elections: No election; Metropolitan borough; Unitary authority; District councils in England; District councils in Northern Ireland

Local elections in the United Kingdom will be held on 6 May 2027. These include all local authorities in Northern Ireland, Scotland and Wales, some local authorities in England, and some directly elected mayors in England. The next Northern Ireland Assembly election is expected to happen at the same time.

== Background ==
This will be the first set of local elections under the premiership of Prime Minister Andy Burnham, who took office in July 2026 following Keir Starmer's resignation.

== England ==
=== Council elections ===
As part of upcoming structural changes to local government in England, it was intended that all areas with a two-tier local government system of county councils and district councils would have those councils abolished and replaced by new single-tier unitary authorities. It was intended that the first elections to the new councils would be on 6 May 2027, and the councils would begin operation on 1 April 2028. As of September 2026, these plans have been withdrawn and the 2027 elections will take place for existing local authorities instead.

Bolding and shading denotes the parties forming the administration on each council.

==== Metropolitan boroughs ====
Council	Seats		Previous election	Current council control						Election details	Council control after election					
Council	up	of	Previous election	Lab	Ref	Con	LD	Grn	Other	Election details	Lab	Ref	Con	LD	Grn	Other
Bolton	20	60	2026	20	10	11	5	3	11	Details						
Bradford	30	90	2026	17	29	18	1	19	13	Details						
Bury	17	51	2026	30	6	3			12	Details						
Calderdale	17	51	2026	8	34		2	7	3	Details						
Coventry	18	54	2026	24	20	6		4		Details						
Dudley	24	72	2026	15	23	27	4		3	Details						
Gateshead	22	66	2026	12	38		13	3		Details						
Kirklees	23	69	2026		29	9	5	12	14	Details						
Knowsley	15	45	2026	24	4		3	8	6	Details						
Leeds	33	99	2026	48	10	14	6	11	10	Details						
Liverpool	85		2023	59			13	4	9	Details						
Manchester	32	96	2026	64	7		4	21		Details						
Newcastle upon Tyne	26	78	2026	2	24		25	24	3	Details						
North Tyneside	20	60	2026	38	11	8		2	1	Details						
Oldham	20	60	2026	18	16	4	6		16	Details						
Rochdale	20	60	2026	31	15	7	3		4	Details						
Salford	20	60	2026	34	14	6	1	3	2	Details						
Sandwell	24	72	2026	28	41			2	1	Details						
Sefton	22	66	2026	36	5		17	3	5	Details						
Sheffield	28	84	2026	25	13		22	20	4	Details						
Solihull	17	51	2026		17	24	6	4		Details						
South Tyneside	18	54	2026	1	41			10	2	Details						
Stockport	21	63	2026	14	2	1	33	4	9	Details						
Sunderland	25	75	2026	5	58		12			Details						
Tameside	19	57	2026	25	19	5			8	Details						
Trafford	21	63	2026	35	2	12	7	7		Details						
Wakefield	21	63	2026	1	58	1	2	1		Details						
Walsall	20	60	2026	1	40	10			9	Details						
Wigan	25	75	2026	42	25				8	Details						
Wirral	65		2023	27	3	14	6	14	2	Details						
Wolverhampton	20	60	2026	35	13	10			2	Details						

==== District councils ====
Council	Seats		Previous election	Current council control						Election details	Council control after election					
Council	up	of	Previous election	Lab	Ref	Con	LD	Grn	Other	Election details	Lab	Ref	Con	LD	Grn	Other
Amber Valley	42		2023	19	3	7	1	6	6	Details						
Arun	54		2023	8	2	19	14	5	6	Details						
Ashfield	35		2023		3	1			31	Details						
Ashford	47		2023	7		17		12	11	Details						
Babergh	32		2023	1	2	6	4	10	9	Details						
Basildon	14	42	2026	12	11	12			7	Details						
Basingstoke and Deane	18	54	2026	10	3	11	11	2	17	Details						
Bassetlaw	48		2023	35	6	3			4 (Note: 1 vacant seat.)	Details						
Blaby	36		2023	5	1	18	8	2	2	Details						
Bolsover	37		2023	22	2	1			12	Details						
Boston	30		2023		1	4	1		24	Details						
Braintree	49		2023	9	1	30		4	5	Details						
Breckland	49 (Note: The LGBCE has issued a final report on new boundaries, but a statutory instrument to implement them has yet to be issued.)		2023	9	5	29		1	5	Details						
Brentwood	13	39	2026	2	8	11	16		2	Details						
Broadland	47		2023	7	1	19	14	4	2	Details						
Bromsgrove	31		2023	6		11	6		8	Details						
Broxbourne	10	30	2026	3	2	25				Details						
Broxtowe	44		2023	7		10	3		24	Details						
Burnley	15	45	2026	10	12	3	6	3	11	Details						
Cambridge	14	42	2026	17		1	11	12	1	Details						
Canterbury	40 (Note: New ward boundaries.)		2023	18		8	8	4	1	Details						
Cannock Chase	12	36	2026	10	13	7	1	3	2	Details						
Charnwood	52		2023	20		22		7	3	Details						
Chelmsford	57		2023		2	19	31		5	Details						
Cherwell	16	48	2026	8	6	8	18	4	4	Details						
Chesterfield	40		2023	27	2		11			Details						
Chichester	36		2023			5	24	2	5	Details						
Chorley	14	42	2026	29	6	4		1	2	Details						
Colchester	17	51	2026	9	5	18	12	3	4	Details						
Cotswold	34		2023			10	22		2	Details						
Crawley	12	36	2026	21	11	4				Details						
Dacorum	51		2023	4		18	19		10	Details						
Dartford	42		2023	10	2	28			2	Details						
Derbyshire Dales	34		2023	6		9	12	4	3	Details						
Dover	32		2023	12		13		1	6	Details						
East Cambridgeshire	28		2023			15	12		1	Details						
East Devon	60		2023			12	22	3	23	Details						
East Hampshire	43		2023	1		18	14	1	9	Details						
East Hertfordshire	50		2023	5	2	14	10	15	4	Details						
East Lindsey	55		2023	6	6	26	1	1	15	Details						
East Staffordshire	37		2023	21		15			1	Details						
East Suffolk	37		2023	11		15	9	16	4	Details						
Eastbourne	27		2023			8	19			Details						
Eastleigh	13	36	2026			1	35		3	Details						
Epping Forest	18	54	2026	1	12	19	6		16	Details						
Erewash	47		2026	25	2	16	1	1	2	Details						
Exeter	14	39	2026	18	3	1	5	10	2	Details						
Fenland	43		2023			35	2		6	Details						
Folkestone and Hythe	30		2023	8	1	5	2	11	3	Details						
Forest of Dean	38		2023	4	1	6	1	15	11	Details						
Fylde	37		2023	2		22	2		11	Details						
Gedling	41		2023	24		9	4		4	Details						
Gravesham	39		2023	22	5	12				Details						
Great Yarmouth	39		2023	18		18			3	Details						
Harborough	34		2023	2	2	15	7	3	5	Details						
Harlow	11	33	2026	10	1	22				Details						
Hart	11	33	2026			8	13		12	Details						
Havant	12	36	2026	7	10	5	5	6	3	Details						
Hertsmere	39		2023	12	2	15	7		3	Details						
High Peak	43		2023	25	1	9	1	2	5	Details						
Hinckley and Bosworth	34		2023	1		9	23		1	Details						
Horsham	48		2023		1	12	26	9		Details						
Hyndburn	12	35	2026	17	8	8		1	1	Details						
Ipswich	16	48	2026	29	10	5	3	1		Details						
King's Lynn and West Norfolk	55		2023	5	7	17	2		24	Details						
Lancaster	61		2023	20		5	7	23	6	Details						
Lewes	41		2023	8			14	18	1	Details						
Lichfield	47		2023	14	1	21	7	1	3	Details						
Lincoln	11	33	2026	17	4	2	7	1	2	Details						
Maldon	31		2023	1	2	10	6		12	Details						
Malvern Hills	31		2023		1	6	5	6	13	Details						
Mansfield	36		2023	26	3	4			3	Details						
Melton	28		2023	5		11	1		11	Details						
Mid Devon	42		2023			3	33	3	3	Details						
Mid Suffolk	34		2023			3	4	23	4	Details						
Mid Sussex	48		2023	1		18	19	4	6	Details						
New Forest	48		2023	1	2	24	14	2	5	Details						
Newark and Sherwood	39		2023	11	2	11	3	1	11	Details						
North Devon	42		2023			7	24	3	8	Details						
North East Derbyshire	53		2023	26	6	14		1	6	Details						
North Kesteven	43		2023	2	2	25	1		13	Details						
North Norfolk	40		2023			11	26		3	Details						
North Warwickshire	35		2023	11	2	17			5	Details						
North West Leicestershire	38		2023	17	1	10	5		5	Details						
Norwich	13	39	2026	12	2		3	21	1	Details						
Oadby and Wigston	26		2023			5	16		5	Details						
Pendle	12	33	2026		5	8	7		13	Details						
Preston	16	48	2026	22	5	3	14	2	2	Details						
Redditch	9	27	2026	13	7	4			3	Details						
Ribble Valley	40		2023	5	4	16	6	2	7	Details						
Rochford	13	39	2026		12	8	6		13	Details						
Rother	38		2023	6	1	10	9	3	9	Details						
Rugby	14	42	2026	12	3	15	12			Details						
Rushcliffe	44		2023	9	1	23	1	2	8	Details						
Rushmoor	13	39	2026	18	6	10	3		2	Details						
Sevenoaks	54		2023		2	27	14	4	7	Details						
South Derbyshire	36		2023	21		11	2		2	Details						
South Hams	31		2023	1		7	19	3	1	Details						
South Holland	37		2023		6	19			12	Details						
South Kesteven	56		2023	2	5	18	3	2	26	Details						
South Norfolk	46		2023	9		23	9	1	4	Details						
South Oxfordshire	36		2023	3		1	20	8	4	Details						
South Ribble	50		2023	28	1	16	5			Details						
South Staffordshire	42		2023	1		28	4	2	7 (Note: 2 vacant seats.)	Details						
St Albans	18	56	2026	2		5	43	3	3	Details						
Stafford	40		2023	12		15	1	5	7	Details						
Staffordshire Moorlands	56		2023	20	1	22	1	2	10	Details						
Stevenage	13	39	2023	21	10	1	6		1	Details						
Stratford-on-Avon	41		2023		2	10	24	3	2	Details						
Swale	47		2023	15	4	10	5	2	11	Details						
Tamworth	10	30	2026	14	11	3		1	1	Details						
Teignbridge	47		2023		1	9	25		12	Details						
Tendring	48		2023	7	7	13	4		17	Details						
Test Valley	43		2023			25	16		2	Details						
Tewkesbury	38		2023		1	8	16	4	9	Details						
Thanet	56		2023	29	5	13		7	2	Details						
Three Rivers	13	39	2026	2		14	18	3	2	Details						
Tonbridge and Malling	44		2023	2		21	11	8	2	Details						
Torridge	44		2023	2		21	11	8	2	Details						
Tunbridge Wells	13	39	2026	2		21	11	8	2	Details						
Uttlesford	39		2023		3	12	3		21	Details						
Vale of White Horse	38		2023			1	31	3	3	Details						
Warwick	44		2023	7		5	9	15	8	Details						
Watford	12	36	2026	4			32			Details						
Wealden	45		2023	2	2	9	11	11	10	Details						
Welwyn Hatfield	16	48	2026	16	3	12	15		2	Details						
West Devon	31		2023	1		10	6	3	11	Details						
West Lancashire	15	45	2026	13	7	12			13	Details						
West Lindsey	36		2023			13	14		9	Details						
West Oxfordshire	16	49	2026	8	1	16	20	4		Details						
West Suffolk	64		2023	15	3	24	1	2	19	Details						
Winchester	16	45	2026			4	36	4	1	Details						
Worthing	11	37	2026	15	5	6	1	8	2	Details						
Wychavon	43		2023	1	1	26	8	6	1	Details						
Wyre	50		2023	15	4	27			4	Details						
Wyre Forest	33		2023	3	1	18		1	10	Details						

==== Unitary authorities ====
Council	Seats		Previous election	Current council control						Election details	Council control after election					
Council	up	of	Previous election	Lab	Ref	Con	LD	Grn	Other	Election details	Lab	Ref	Con	LD	Grn	Other
Bath and North East Somerset	59		2023	6		2	39	3	9	Details						
Bedford	46		2023	12		14	13	4	3	Details						
Blackburn with Darwen	17	51	2026	20	9	5			17	Details						
Blackpool	42		2023	26	4	11			1	Details						
Bournemouth, Christchurch and Poole	76		2023	8	2	9	29	6	22	Details						
Bracknell Forest	41		2023	20		10	7	3	1	Details						
Brighton and Hove	54		2023	31		5		11	7	Details						
Central Bedfordshire	63		2023	4	2	20	8	1	28	Details						
Cheshire East	87		2023	28	1	35	1	1	16	Details						
Cheshire West and Chester	70		2023	35	3	21	1	2	8	Details						
Cumberland	55		2022	26		8	4	3	5	Details						
Darlington	41		2023	23	1	13	2	6	5	Details						
Derby	51		2023	24	5	14	3		5	Details						
East Riding of Yorkshire	67		2023	4	2	25	21	3	12	Details						
Halton	18	54	2026	29	16		3		4	Details						
Hartlepool	12	36	2026	15	15	1			5	Details						
Herefordshire	53		2023	1		20	12	8	12	Details						
Hull	19	57	2026	16	10		26		5	Details						
Leicester	54		2023	31		15	3	4	1	Details						
Luton	48		2023	26		3	15		1	Details						
Medway	59		2023	31	3	17			8	Details						
Middlesbrough	46		2023	24	1	4	1		16	Details						
Milton Keynes	20	60	2026	19	9	12	20			Details						
North East Lincolnshire	15	42	2026	11	14	10	3		4	Details						
North Lincolnshire	43		2023	15	1	27				Details						
North Somerset	51		2023	10	1	15	8	8	8	Details						
North Yorkshire	89		2022	10	3	43	13	4	17	Details						
Nottingham	55		2023	44				1	10	Details						
Peterborough	20	60	2026	10	4	14	8	7	17	Details						
Plymouth	19	57	2026	30	12	3		3	9	Details						
Portsmouth	14	42	2026	3	12	3	23		1	Details						
Reading	16	48	2026	29		5	3	11		Details						
Redcar and Cleveland	59		2023	22		13	9		15	Details						
Rutland	27		2023	2		7	10		8	Details						
Slough	42		2023	11		20	10		1	Details						
Somerset	96		2022	5	2	32	62	5	4	Details						
South Gloucestershire	61		2023	16		23	20		2	Details						
Southampton	17	51	2026	24	8	6	8	5		Details						
Southend-on-Sea	17	51	2026	17	11	11	3	4	5	Details						
Stockton-on-Tees	56		2023	22		26			8	Details						
Stoke-on-Trent	44		2023	27	5	8			4	Details						
Telford and Wrekin	54		2023	38		7	6		3	Details						
Torbay	36		2023			17	15		4	Details						
West Berkshire	43		2023	1		11	28	2	1	Details						
Westmorland and Furness	65		2022	15		10	36	1	3	Details						
Windsor & Maidenhead	41		2023		1	7	21		12	Details						
Wokingham	18	54	2026	6		19	28	1		Details						
York	48		2023	24		3	19		1	Details						

=== Mayoral elections ===
The Mayor of Leicester role is to be abolished.

Council	Mayor before	Mayor-elect	Details
Bedford	Tom Wootton (Con)		
Mansfield	Andy Abrahams (Lab)		
Middlesbrough	Chris Cooke (Labour Co-op)		

All combined authority mayors up for election in 2027 are newly-established roles.

Combined authority	Mayor after	Details
Cheshire and Warrington		Details
Cumbria		Details

== Northern Ireland ==
Council	Seats	Previous election	Current councillors								Election details	Councillors after election							
Council	Seats	Previous election	SF (N)	DUP (U)	APNI (O)	UUP (U)	SDLP (N)	TUV (U)	Green (O)	Others	Election details	SF (N)	DUP (U)	APNI (O)	UUP (U)	SDLP (N)	TUV (U)	Green (O)	Others
Antrim & Newtownabbey	40	2023	9	13	8	6	1			3	Details								
Ards & North Down	40	2023		14	12	8	1		2	3	Details								
Armagh City, Banbridge and Craigavon	41	2023	15	13	4	6	1	1		1	Details								
Belfast	60	2023	22	14	11	2	5	1	3	2	Details								
Causeway Coast & Glens	40	2023	12	13	5	3	2	2		3	Details								
Derry City & Strabane	40	2023	18	5		3	8			6	Details								
Fermanagh & Omagh	40	2023	21	6	2	7	2			2	Details								
Lisburn & Castlereagh	40	2023	4	14	13	6	2			1	Details								
Mid & East Antrim	40	2023	4	13	7	8		6		2	Details								
Mid Ulster	40	2023	19	11		2	5			3	Details								
Newry, Mourne & Down	41	2023	20	5	4	1	8			3	Details								
All councils	462		144	121	66	52	35	10	5	29									

In the table above, U signifies unionist, N nationalist and O other.

== Scotland ==
Bolding and shading denotes the parties in charge of each council.

Council	Seats	Previous election	Current council control							Election details	Council control after election						
Council	Seats	Previous election	SNP	Lab	Con	LD	Ref	Grn	Other	Election details	SNP	Lab	Con	LD	Ref	Grn	Other
Aberdeen City	45	2022	19	11	6	3	1		5	Details							
Aberdeenshire	70	2022	18		20	14	7		11	Details							
Angus	28	2022	11	1	8				8	Details							
Argyll and Bute	36	2022	13	1	7	4	2		9	Details							
Clackmannanshire	18	2022	8	5	3			1	1	Details							
Dumfries and Galloway	43	2022	11	8	10	1			13	Details							
Dundee City	29	2022	15	8	1	4			1	Details							
East Ayrshire	32	2022	14	8	4				6	Details							
East Dunbartonshire	22	2022	8	5	2	5			2	Details							
East Lothian	22	2022	6	10	4			1	1	Details							
East Renfrewshire	18	2022	5	5	5				3	Details							
City of Edinburgh	63	2022	17	11	10	14		11		Details							
Falkirk	30	2022	11	8	4		1		6	Details							
Fife	75	2022	34	18	6	13	2		2	Details							
Glasgow City	85	2022	37	31	1		2	8	6	Details							
Highland	74	2022	19	2	6	16		3	28	Details							
Inverclyde	22	2022	6	9	2				5	Details							
Midlothian	18	2022	8	6	2				2	Details							
Moray	26	2022	7	3	10			2	4	Details							
Na h-Eileanan Siar	29	2022	5		1	1			22	Details							
North Ayrshire	33	2022	12	11	5		2		3	Details							
North Lanarkshire	77	2022	24	32	5			1	15	Details							
Orkney Islands	21	2022						1	20	Details							
Perth and Kinross	40	2022	16	1	12	5			6	Details							
Renfrewshire	43	2022	20	12	3	1	3		4	Details							
Scottish Borders	34	2022	7		15	3		1	8	Details							
Shetland Islands	23	2022	1					1	21	Details							
South Ayrshire	28	2022	5	5	5		2		13	Details							
South Lanarkshire	64	2022	25	25	5	3		1	3	Details							
Stirling	23	2022	10	4	7			1	1	Details							
West Dunbartonshire	22	2022	7	8					7	Details							
West Lothian	33	2022	15	11	4	1	1		1	Details							
All councils	1,226		414	259	173	88	23	32	237								

== Wales ==
Bolding and shading denotes the parties in charge of each council.

Council	Seats	Previous election	Current council control							Election details	Council control after election						
Council	Seats	Previous election	Lab	PC	Con	LD	Ref	Grn	Other	Election details	Lab	PC	Con	LD	Ref	Grn	Other
Blaenau Gwent	33	2022	19				1	1	12	Details							
Bridgend	51	2022	26	1	1		1		22	Details							
Caerphilly	69	2022	43	19				1	6	Details							
Cardiff	79	2022	50	2	9	10	1	1	6	Details							
Carmarthenshire	75	2022	16	37			2	1	19	Details							
Ceredigion	38	2022		21		7			10	Details							
Conwy	55	2022	7	8	8	4	2	1	25	Details							
Denbighshire	48	2022	14	8	8			2	15	Details							
Flintshire	67	2022	27		1	4	1		34	Details							
Gwynedd	69	2022		46		1			22	Details							
Isle of Anglesey	35	2022	3	19		1	1		11	Details							
Merthyr Tydfil	30	2022	15						15	Details							
Monmouthshire	46	2022	21		19		1	1	5	Details							
Neath Port Talbot	60	2022	26	11		3		1	19	Details							
Newport	51	2022	33		6	1		2	8	Details							
Pembrokeshire	60	2022	9	3	11	2	1		34	Details							
Powys	68	2022	9	4	13	21	4	1	15	Details							
Rhondda Cynon Taf	75	2022	58	8	2				7	Details							
Swansea	75	2022	44		4	13	1	1	11	Details							
Torfaen	40	2022	28				4		8	Details							
Vale of Glamorgan	54	2022	24	8	13		1		8	Details							
Wrexham	56	2022	14	7	7		1		27	Details							
All councils	1,234		485	202	102	67	22	14	339								

== See also ==
- Political make-up of local councils in the United Kingdom
