= 2027 Dartford Borough Council election =

2027 English local government election

- 6 May 2027

All 42 seats to Dartford Borough Council 22 seats needed for a majority
Leader	Jeremy Kite	Jonathon Hawkes
Party	Conservative	Labour
Leader's seat	Longfield, New Barn & Southfleet	Ebbsfleet
Last election	29 seats, 55.8%	11 seats, 34.9%
Current seats	28	10
Leader	Michael Brown
Party	Reform	Independent
Leader's seat	Greenhithe & Knockhall
Last election	0 seats, 1.0%	0 seats, 0.2%
Current seats	2	2
Incumbent Leader
Jeremy Kite
Conservative

The 2027 Dartford Borough Council election will be held on 6 May 2027 to elect members of Dartford Borough Council in Kent, England. This will be on the same day as other local elections held across the United Kingdom.

== Background ==
=== Local government reorganisation ===
Due to proposed structural changes to local government in England, the 2023 election would have been the final election to the council before it was abolished and replaced by North Kent Council, a unitary authority. However, on 7 September 2026, the government announced it was withdrawing plans for the planned restructuring pending review. Following this announcement, local elections due to be held in 2027 under the existing local electoral calendar would proceed.

== Summary ==
=== Election result ===
2027 Dartford Borough Council election
Party	Candidates	Seats	Gains	Losses	Net gain/loss	Seats %	Votes %	Votes	+/−
Conservative		28 (Note: Current seats.)							
Labour		10							
Reform		2							
Independent		2							
