= 2027 Bedford Borough Council election =

2027 English local government election

- 6 May 2027

All 46 seats to Bedford Borough Council 24 seats needed for a majority
Leader	Graeme Coombes	Henry Vann	Abu Sultan
Party	Conservative	Liberal Democrats	Labour
Leader's seat	Wixams & Wilstead	De Parys	Cauldwell
Last election	13 seats, 27.9%	13 seats, 27.7%	14 seats, 29.4%
Current seats	14	13	12
Leader	Ben Foley
Party	Green	Independent
Leader's seat	Greyfriars
Last election	3 seats, 8.1%	2 seats, 6.5%
Current seats	4	3
Incumbent Mayor
Tom Wootton
Conservative

The 2027 Bedford Borough Council election will be held on 6 May 2027 to elect members of Bedford Borough Council in Bedfordshire, England. This will be on the same day as other local elections held across the United Kingdom. The whole council will be up for election, with 46 seats across 28 wards, and 24 seats will be needed for a majority.

The directly elected Mayor of Bedford will also be elected on the same day, with Tom Wootton (Conservative) attempting to defend the position after having won it in 2023 over Dave Hodgson (Liberal Democrats). Unlike the election in 2023 which used first-past-the-post, the 2027 mayoral election will use the supplementary vote system.

== Summary ==
=== Election result ===
2027 Bedford Borough Council election
Party	Candidates	Seats	Gains	Losses	Net gain/loss	Seats %	Votes %	Votes	+/−
Conservative		14 (Note: Current seats.)							
Liberal Democrats		13							
Labour		12							
Green		4							
Independent		3							
