= 2004 Bedford Borough Council election =

2004 English local election

Results of the 2004 Bedford Borough Council election

The 2004 Bedford Borough Council election took place on 10 June 2004 to elect members of Bedford Borough Council in England. This was on the same day as other local elections.

Results were seen as a setback for elected Mayor Frank Branston, as councillors who had defected to his Better Bedford Party such as Patrick Naughton in Goldington were defeated.

Prior to the election, one councillor left the Conservative group to sit as an independent.

== Summary ==
=== Election result ===
2004 Bedford Borough Council election
| Party | This election | | | Full council | | | This election | | |
| Party | Seats | Net | Seats % | Other | Total | Total % | Votes | Votes % | +/− |
|---|---|---|---|---|---|---|---|---|---|
| Conservative | 5 | ▼1 | 27.8 | 11 | 16 | 29.6 | 11,488 | 32.3 | +3.6 |
| Labour | 6 | ▲2 | 33.3 | 9 | 15 | 27.8 | 8,170 | 23.0 | +4.2 |
| Liberal Democrats | 5 | ▲1 | 27.8 | 8 | 13 | 24.1 | 9,867 | 27.7 | +3.3 |
| Better Bedford Party | 1 | ▼1 | 5.6 | 5 | 6 | 11.1 | 3,008 | 8.5 | –10.3 |
| Independent | 1 | ▼1 | 5.6 | 3 | 4 | 7.4 | 603 | 1.7 | –6.1 |
| Association of Bedfordshire Citizens | 0 | Steady | 0.0 | 0 | 0 | 0.0 | 1,661 | 4.7 | N/A |
| UKIP | 0 | Steady | 0.0 | 0 | 0 | 0.0 | 523 | 1.5 | N/A |
| Green | 0 | Steady | 0.0 | 0 | 0 | 0.0 | 227 | 0.6 | –0.1 |
| The Consensus | 0 | Steady | 0.0 | 0 | 0 | 0.0 | 16 | <0.1 | N/A |

== Ward results ==
=== Brickhill ===
Brickhill
| Party | Candidate | Votes | % | ±% |
|---|---|---|---|---|
| Conservative | Andrew McConnell* | 1,584 | 48.2 | +0.6 |
| Liberal Democrats | Mark Fitzpatrick | 1,377 | 41.9 | +2.0 |
| Labour | Rebecca Chowdhury | 211 | 6.4 | −5.3 |
| Association of Bedfordshire Citizens | Nicholas Pape | 117 | 3.6 | N/A |
| Majority | | 207 | 6.3 | |
| Turnout | | 3,289 | 49.9 | |
| Registered electors | | 6,598 | | |
| Conservative hold | | Swing | | |

=== Bromham ===
Bromham
| Party | Candidate | Votes | % | ±% |
|---|---|---|---|---|
| Conservative | James Ashby | 1,582 | 66.4 | −7.1 |
| Liberal Democrats | Stelios Mores | 432 | 18.1 | +1.9 |
| Labour | Yanina Jones | 248 | 10.4 | −1.9 |
| Association of Bedfordshire Citizens | Sarah Taylor | 122 | 5.1 | N/A |
| Majority | | 1,150 | 48.2 | |
| Turnout | | 2,384 | 40.7 | |
| Registered electors | | 5,864 | | |
| Conservative hold | | Swing | | |

=== Castle ===
Castle
| Party | Candidate | Votes | % | ±% |
|---|---|---|---|---|
| Better Bedford Party | Peter Chiswell* | 1,127 | 44.3 | +2.3 |
| Labour | Jane Caldwell | 624 | 24.5 | −15.3 |
| Liberal Democrats | Pierrette Lob-Levyt | 324 | 12.7 | +1.5 |
| Conservative | Michael Williams | 303 | 11.9 | −30.1 |
| Association of Bedfordshire Citizens | Glenn Farrar | 105 | 4.1 | N/A |
| Green | Saul Keyworth | 62 | 2.4 | N/A |
| Majority | | 503 | 19.8 | |
| Turnout | | 2,545 | 41.8 | |
| Registered electors | | 6,092 | | |
| Better Bedford Party gain from Conservative | | Swing | | |

=== Cauldwell ===
Cauldwell
| Party | Candidate | Votes | % | ±% |
|---|---|---|---|---|
| Labour | Randolph Charles* | 937 | 51.8 | −9.4 |
| Conservative | Katherine Stacey | 393 | 21.7 | +9.7 |
| Liberal Democrats | Barry Bentham | 327 | 18.1 | +2.9 |
| Association of Bedfordshire Citizens | Janet Bartram | 153 | 8.5 | N/A |
| Majority | | 544 | 30.1 | |
| Turnout | | 1,810 | 30.5 | |
| Registered electors | | 5,929 | | |
| Labour hold | | Swing | | |

=== Clapham ===
Clapham
| Party | Candidate | Votes | % | ±% |
|---|---|---|---|---|
| Independent | Mollie Foster* | 603 | 37.1 | −23.3 |
| Conservative | Frederick Sparrow | 525 | 32.3 | −28.1 |
| Labour | Terence Carroll | 230 | 14.1 | −3.4 |
| Liberal Democrats | Stephen Lawson | 202 | 12.4 | +4.1 |
| Association of Bedfordshire Citizens | Paul Dempsey | 66 | 4.1 | N/A |
| Majority | | 78 | 4.8 | |
| Turnout | | 1,626 | 38.1 | |
| Registered electors | | 4,263 | | |
| Independent gain from Conservative | | Swing | | |

=== De Parys ===
De Parys
| Party | Candidate | Votes | % | ±% |
|---|---|---|---|---|
| Conservative | Tarsem Paul | 748 | 42.7 | −0.7 |
| Liberal Democrats | John Ryan* | 648 | 37.0 | −8.1 |
| Better Bedford Party | Michael Mawson | 178 | 10.2 | N/A |
| Labour | Marilyn Leask | 140 | 8.0 | −2.6 |
| Association of Bedfordshire Citizens | Deba Choudhury | 36 | 2.1 | N/A |
| Majority | | 100 | 5.7 | |
| Turnout | | 1,750 | 42.8 | |
| Registered electors | | 4,086 | | |
| Conservative gain from Liberal Democrats | | Swing | | |

=== Eastcotts ===
Eastcotts
| Party | Candidate | Votes | % | ±% |
|---|---|---|---|---|
| Liberal Democrats | Christine McHugh* | 569 | 61.5 | +7.1 |
| Conservative | Paul Chetcuti | 267 | 28.9 | −10.5 |
| Labour | Franca Garrick | 47 | 5.1 | −1.1 |
| Association of Bedfordshire Citizens | Vivian Suter | 42 | 4.5 | N/A |
| Majority | | 302 | 32.6 | |
| Turnout | | 925 | 43.3 | |
| Registered electors | | 2,137 | | |
| Liberal Democrats hold | | Swing | | |

=== Goldington ===
Goldington
| Party | Candidate | Votes | % | ±% |
|---|---|---|---|---|
| Liberal Democrats | Philip Merryman | 1,076 | 44.8 | −15.3 |
| Better Bedford Party | Patrick Naughton* | 661 | 27.5 | −32.6 |
| Labour | Timothy Caswell | 313 | 13.0 | −9.0 |
| Conservative | Alan Cassan | 303 | 12.6 | ±0.0 |
| Association of Bedfordshire Citizens | Francesca Ariano | 33 | 1.4 | N/A |
| The Consensus | Dirk Bruere | 16 | 0.7 | N/A |
| Majority | | 415 | 17.3 | |
| Turnout | | 2,402 | 37.7 | |
| Registered electors | | 6,370 | | |
| Liberal Democrats hold | | Swing | | |

=== Great Barford ===
Great Barford
| Party | Candidate | Votes | % | ±% |
|---|---|---|---|---|
| Conservative | Robert Harrison* | 1,152 | 63.9 | +9.7 |
| Liberal Democrats | Paul Stekelis | 296 | 16.4 | +8.8 |
| Labour | Pauline Curl | 212 | 11.8 | −4.5 |
| Association of Bedfordshire Citizens | Rita Robinson | 144 | 8.0 | N/A |
| Majority | | 856 | 47.5 | |
| Turnout | | 1,804 | 44.1 | |
| Registered electors | | 4,089 | | |
| Conservative hold | | Swing | | |

=== Harpur ===
Harpur
| Party | Candidate | Votes | % | ±% |
|---|---|---|---|---|
| Labour | Colleen Atkins | 889 | 41.7 | +3.0 |
| Conservative | Brian Dillingham* | 638 | 29.9 | −11.9 |
| Better Bedford Party | Alberto Thomas | 285 | 13.4 | N/A |
| Liberal Democrats | Melanie Parra-Whitehead | 177 | 8.3 | −2.7 |
| Green | Jennifer Foley | 113 | 5.3 | −5.2 |
| Association of Bedfordshire Citizens | Brian Gibbons | 32 | 1.5 | N/A |
| Majority | | 251 | 11.8 | |
| Turnout | | 2,134 | 35.7 | |
| Registered electors | | 5,974 | | |
| Labour gain from Conservative | | Swing | | |

=== Kempston East ===
Kempston East
| Party | Candidate | Votes | % | ±% |
|---|---|---|---|---|
| Labour | David Lewis | 707 | 42.8 | +1.2 |
| Conservative | Eileen Whitmore** | 454 | 27.5 | −18.6 |
| Better Bedford Party | Mary Stupple | 281 | 17.0 | N/A |
| Liberal Democrats | Joan Slater | 161 | 9.7 | +3.0 |
| Association of Bedfordshire Citizens | Janet Suter | 50 | 3.0 | N/A |
| Majority | | 253 | 15.3 | |
| Turnout | | 1,653 | 37.4 | |
| Registered electors | | 4,425 | | |
| Labour gain from Conservative | | Swing | | |

Eileen Whitmore was a sitting councillor in Bromham ward.

=== Kempston North ===
Kempston North
| Party | Candidate | Votes | % | ±% |
|---|---|---|---|---|
| Labour | Ray Oliver | 611 | 43.3 | −12.6 |
| Conservative | Mark Smith | 456 | 32.3 | −3.5 |
| Liberal Democrats | Andrew Gerard | 161 | 11.4 | +0.1 |
| Better Bedford Party | Gurminder Singh | 136 | 9.6 | N/A |
| Association of Bedfordshire Citizens | Christine Richards | 48 | 3.4 | N/A |
| Majority | | 155 | 11.0 | |
| Turnout | | 1,412 | 35.5 | |
| Registered electors | | 3,980 | | |
| Labour hold | | Swing | | |

=== Kempston South ===
Kempston South
| Party | Candidate | Votes | % | ±% |
|---|---|---|---|---|
| Labour | William Hunt* | 804 | 45.1 | +6.1 |
| Conservative | Jagdish Singh | 437 | 24.5 | +10.4 |
| Liberal Democrats | Timothy Hill | 348 | 19.5 | +8.0 |
| Association of Bedfordshire Citizens | Barbara Lowden-Smith | 193 | 10.8 | N/A |
| Majority | | 367 | 20.6 | |
| Turnout | | 1,782 | 31.7 | |
| Registered electors | | 5,615 | | |
| Labour hold | | Swing | | |

=== Kingsbrook ===
Kingsbrook
| Party | Candidate | Votes | % | ±% |
|---|---|---|---|---|
| Liberal Democrats | Dave Hodgson* | 1,067 | 52.4 | +9.8 |
| Labour | Elizabeth Luder | 551 | 27.1 | −13.1 |
| Conservative | Barbara Purbrick | 280 | 13.8 | +2.8 |
| Association of Bedfordshire Citizens | Charlene Tillotson | 138 | 6.8 | N/A |
| Majority | | 516 | 25.3 | |
| Turnout | | 2,036 | 31.0 | |
| Registered electors | | 6,564 | | |
| Liberal Democrats hold | | Swing | | |

=== Newnham ===
Newnham
| Party | Candidate | Votes | % | ±% |
|---|---|---|---|---|
| Liberal Democrats | Paul Whitehead | 465 | 30.0 | −0.4 |
| Conservative | Colin Crane* | 461 | 29.8 | −7.3 |
| Better Bedford Party | Edward Davey | 340 | 22.0 | N/A |
| Labour | June McDonald | 203 | 13.1 | −15.4 |
| Green | Chris Davies | 52 | 3.4 | N/A |
| Association of Bedfordshire Citizens | Betty Stapleton | 27 | 1.7 | N/A |
| Majority | | 4 | 0.3 | |
| Turnout | | 1,548 | 38.4 | |
| Registered electors | | 4,035 | | |
| Liberal Democrats gain from Conservative | | Swing | | |

=== Putnoe ===
Putnoe
| Party | Candidate | Votes | % | ±% |
|---|---|---|---|---|
| Liberal Democrats | Linda Weerasirie | 1,277 | 43.6 | +2.4 |
| Conservative | Peter Allen | 814 | 27.8 | +1.5 |
| UKIP | Mark Adkin | 523 | 17.8 | −7.5 |
| Labour | Charan Sekhon | 211 | 7.2 | −2.9 |
| Association of Bedfordshire Citizens | Robert Wane | 105 | 3.6 | N/A |
| Majority | | 463 | 15.8 | |
| Turnout | | 2,930 | 44.0 | |
| Registered electors | | 6,659 | | |
| Liberal Democrats hold | | Swing | | |

=== Queens Park ===
Queens Park
| Party | Candidate | Votes | % | ±% |
|---|---|---|---|---|
| Labour | Muhummad Khan* | 1,078 | 57.8 | −5.3 |
| Liberal Democrats | Neal Bath | 348 | 18.6 | +8.6 |
| Conservative | Atul Sikand | 302 | 16.2 | +31 |
| Association of Bedfordshire Citizens | Roland Warder | 138 | 7.4 | N/A |
| Majority | | 730 | 39.1 | |
| Turnout | | 1,866 | 39.2 | |
| Registered electors | | 4,771 | | |
| Labour hold | | Swing | | |

=== Wootton ===
Wootton
| Party | Candidate | Votes | % | ±% |
|---|---|---|---|---|
| Conservative | John Tait | 789 | 47.3 | +11.9 |
| Liberal Democrats | Michael Murphy | 612 | 36.7 | +5.5 |
| Labour | Adrien Beardmore | 154 | 9.2 | −0.2 |
| Association of Bedfordshire Citizens | Stewart Lister | 112 | 6.7 | N/A |
| Majority | | 177 | 10.6 | |
| Turnout | | 1,667 | 40.5 | |
| Registered electors | | 4,116 | | |
| Conservative gain from Independent | | Swing | | |
