= Riseley, Bedfordshire =

Village in Bedfordshire, England

Coordinates: 52.2514°N 0.4769°W

Riseley
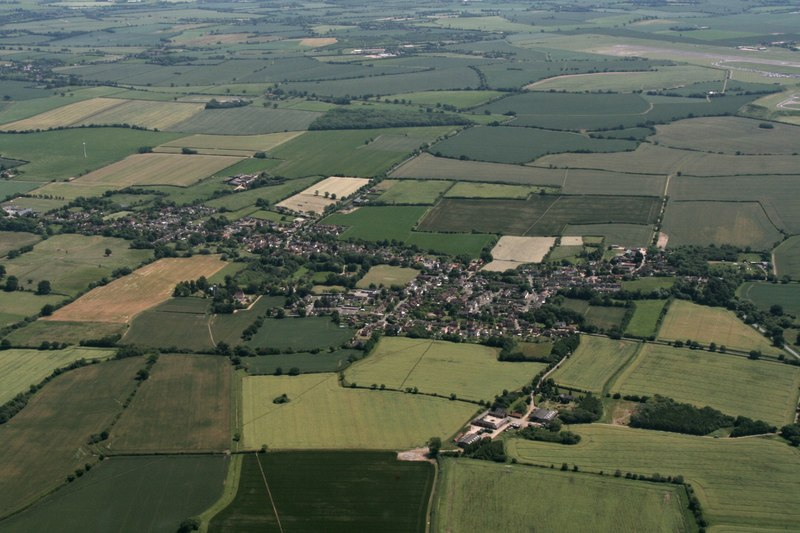
- Aerial view in 2017

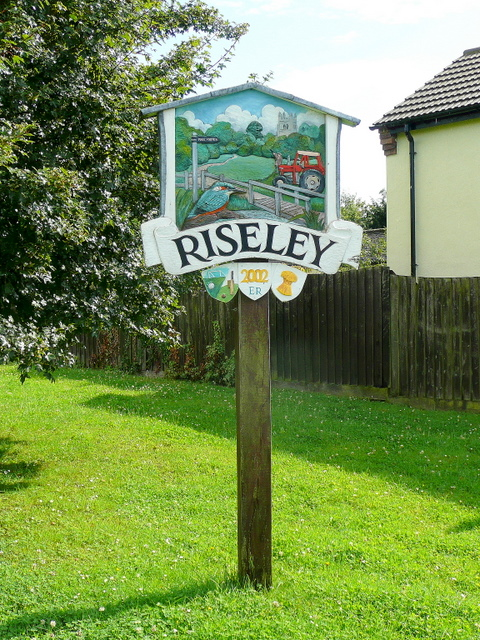
- The village sign

- Location within Bedfordshire
- Population: 1,320 (2021 Census)
- OS grid reference: TL048644
- Unitary authority: Bedford
- Ceremonial county: Bedfordshire
- Region: East
- Country: England
- Sovereign state: United Kingdom
- Post town: BEDFORD
- Postcode district: MK44
- Dialling code: 01234
- Police: Bedfordshire
- Fire: Bedfordshire
- Ambulance: East of England
- UK Parliament: North Bedfordshire

Riseley is a village and civil parish located in North Bedfordshire, England. The village name has had alternative spellings in the past such as Rislau, Riseleg, Riselai and Risely, however all these spellings are considered archaic. As of the 2021 census, the population of the village is 1,320, an increase from 1,286 at the 2011 Census.

Riseley is one of the larger villages in the Borough of Bedford, and has an eponymous electoral ward. For general elections,Riseley is in the constituency of North Bedfordshire. The village is also its own civil parish which has a parish council. It first appeared in the Domesday Book and is set out as a linear village.

== Geography ==
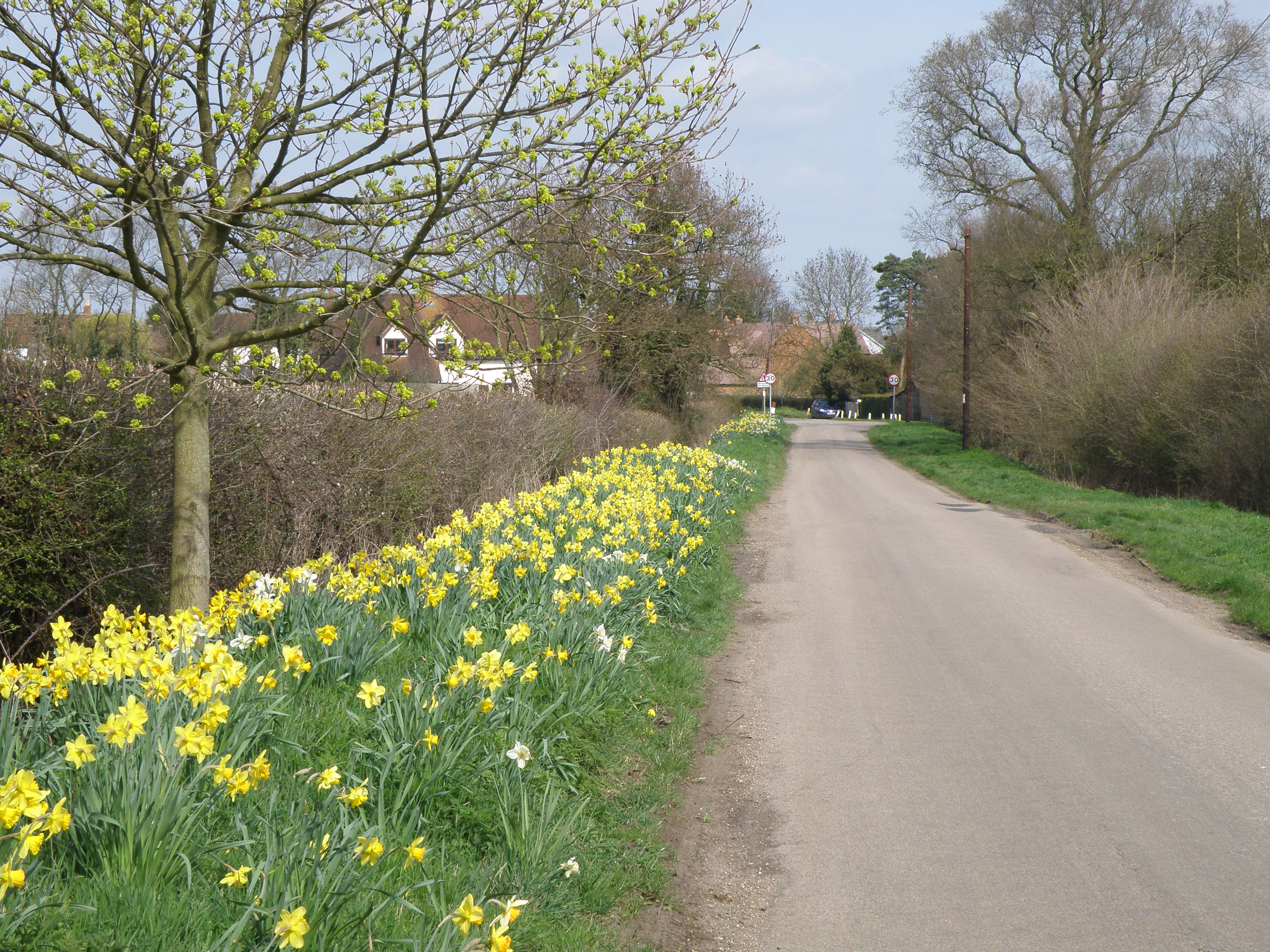
Springtime in Riseley

Riseley is near the villages of Bletsoe, Sharnbrook, Swineshead, Pertenhall, Keysoe, Thurleigh and Melchbourne. The nearest town to Riseley is Rushden in the neighbouring county of Northamptonshire, approximately 8 miles away to the north west. The county town of Bedford is approximately 9 miles to the South of Riseley. The village has one watercourse, which is a tributary of the River Ouse, flowing through it known locally as the 'Brook' around which in medieval times the village was built.

== History ==
Riseley appears in the Domesday Book of 1086 where the village's name is spelt Riselai. The village is listed as being in the Stodden Hundred. The domesday survey also states that the village contains twenty five households which is considered large for a settlement of the time. The survey also states that in 1066 some of Riseley was overlorded by Godric the Sheriff a man who is assumed to have died in the Battle of Hastings.

=== Riseley in the Middle Ages ===
Much of Riseley's Medieval history involves the Knights Hospitallers who in 1279 gained possession of land and manors in Riseley as well as possessions in surrounding areas. The knights owned both Harvies Manor and the Manor of Lawrence (which was controlled by the Lawrence family). The Knights also had rights of free warren. Some of Riseley's history also involves the Knights Templar they are involved in Riseley because the aforementioned Harvies Manor can be first separately identified back in 1279 when Walter son of Geoffrey de Riseley held 4 hides of land in Riseley of the Knights Templar. Seeing as how both the Knights Hospitaller and Knights Templar are involved in Riseley history back in 1279 it has been suggested that the two organisations have been confused for each other somewhere along the line.

There is evidence of Riseley being affected by the Black Death back in 1351 when 300 acres of arable land became worthless due to them being uncultivated and no one occupying them. During the Middle Ages, 1346 to be exact, Riseley was also home to a murder when William Petersoil, a member of a family which owned a manor in Riseley named the manor of Petersoills (or Petersoyles), was murdered.

=== Brick making in Riseley ===
Riseley has a long tradition of brick and tile making, dating back to at least 1558, due in part to its clay rich soil. During the nineteenth century the village was home to a brickworks and brickmaking became one of the village's main industries with 12 brickmakers recorded living in the village in the 1841 census and 15 brickmakers living there according to both the 1851 and 1861 censuses. The village also had a history of lace making with 80 of the 118 houses in the village being involved in the activity in 1851.

=== Riseley in WW2 ===
During World War 2 Riseley was used by the USAAF as a base to store and fill bombs which were then forwarded to local American air bases. A large camp was set up at the top of the Carriage Drive to Melchbourne House to house the troops. The camp included a cinema. The American airmen stationed in Riseley Camp occasionally held parties for local children and there are still residents living in Riseley who can recall attending the children's parties on the camp. A 'Forward Filling Station' was set up in the woods at the top of the carriage drive where bombs were filled with gas. The last remaining containers of gas were removed in the 1970s. However remnants of deadly mustard agent and its breakdown products still remain in part of Coppice Wood near Riseley in an area which is currently fenced off and surrounded by warning signs about toxic chemicals. This mustard gas was meant to have been removed in 1988 and then again in 1998 but some of it still remains in the wood. Bombs were also stored on the then closed Sharnbrook Road just past the junction with the Butts.

In October 1943 a B17 Flying Fortress aircraft returning from a bombing raid in Germany, crashed in a cottage garden at the north end of the High Street. The crew had bailed out before the crash as the plane had been seriously damaged by a German fighter aircraft on its return from Germany. During the war, a British fighter plane crashed when it ran out of fuel at the bottom end of the village. The crew bailed out safely and no-one was harmed in the incident.

A dummy airfield is also located just outside the village which was used during the Second World War.

=== Riseley High Street ===
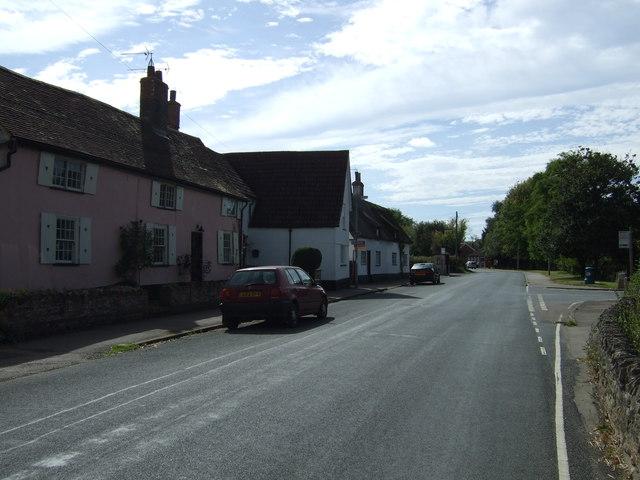
High Street

Riseley High Street runs more or less North South for a distance of one mile from end to end and was designated as a Turnpike in May 1802. A widened area in the grass verge at the southern end of the High Street where the High Street is joined by Sharnbrook Road marks where the tollbooth stood. This road junction is still known as Tollbar Corner. A Blue Plaque mounted on the end wall facing the High Street of the cottage adjoining 76 High Street commemorates the placing of the plaque 200 years after the toll road designation.

Riseley High Street has been the scene of flooding over the years, when sudden downpours of rain have caused the Brook to 'come out' starting at a point opposite the blacksmiths. The water has been known the rise up to the height of a small car and stretch as far as the Gold Street bridge in the south and Brook House in the north. Recent regular clearing of reeds by Anglian Water has dramatically reduced the frequency of these events.

Riseley High Street contains a large proportion of the houses in the village and is approximately a mile long. There is no obvious centre to the village, with the church, shop, schools and village hall, all spread out over the village and some along the high street. For many areas along the high street the village is a single street with houses on either side. This makes Riseley an example of a linear village.

== Governance ==
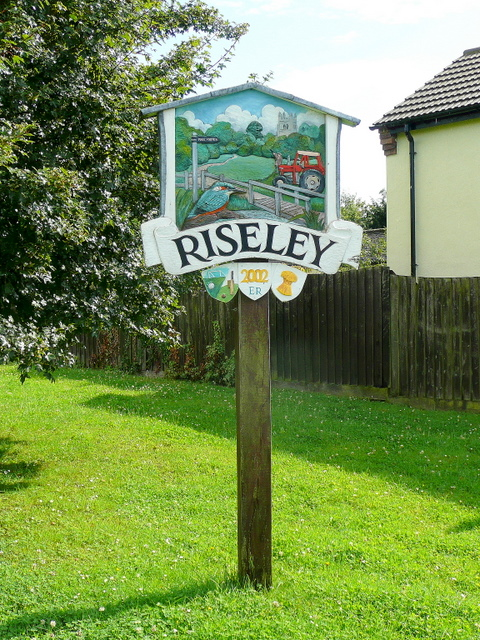
Village sign

Riseley lies within the Borough of Bedford and with a population over one thousand is one of the larger villages in the Borough. The village has a ward named after it which includes not only Riseley but some of the smaller villages surrounding it such as Thurleigh and Keysoe. In the 2011 borough election, an independent was elected for Riseley Ward. Following the independent candidate's retirement, the 2015, 2019 and 2023 elections were won by the Conservative Party.

For Parliamentary elections Riseley is in the North Bedfordshire constituency. Until 2024, it was in North East Bedfordshire and before 1983 in the Bedford constituency. Riseley is also its own civil parish and has a parish council.

== Facilities ==
=== Schools ===
The village now has one school, Riseley CofE Primary School. Until 2017 Riseley had two schools, Riseley Lower School which was for 4–9 year olds, and Margaret Beaufort Middle School, 9-13 year olds. Riseley Lower was a small school, about 150 students, with a catchment area of Riseley, Pertenhall, Bletsoe and Swineshead. Margaret Beaufort Middle School, opened in 1962, takes pupils from the same surrounding villages as the lower school as well as students from other feeder lower schools such as the lower schools in Sharnbrook and Thurleigh. The school had approximately 400 students and is named after Lady Margaret Beaufort who was born nearby in Bletsoe Castle. Riseley is within the catchment area of Sharnbrook Academy, located four miles away in Sharnbrook.

=== Riseley pubs ===
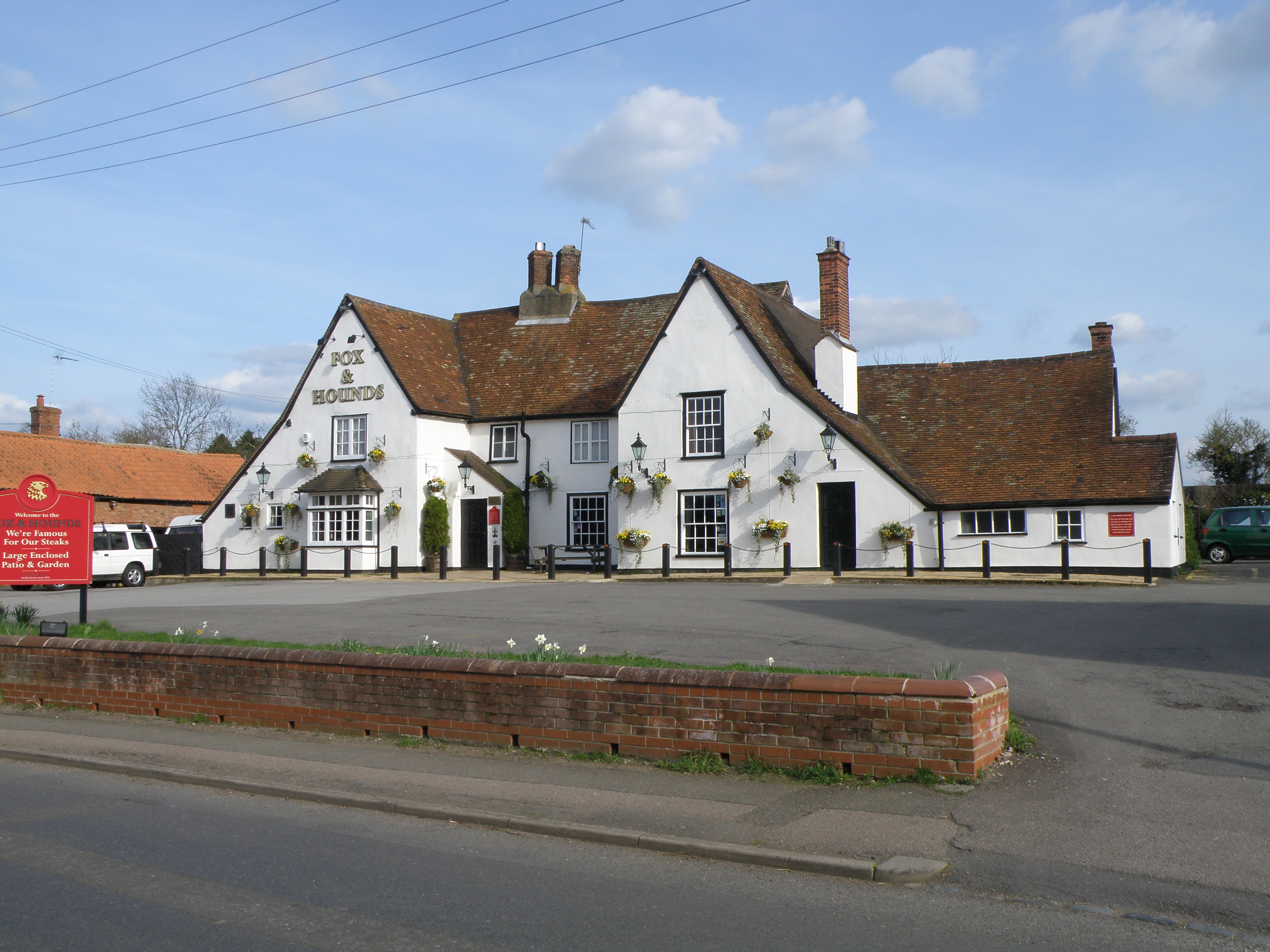
Fox and Hounds

Although there is now only one pub remaining open for trade in Riseley, there have been as many as eight over the years. The White Horse situated in the High Street opposite the junction with Lowsden Lane closed in the early 1970s. The Royal Oak in the High Street near Maple Gardens is a thatched old cottage style building and closed as a pub in the 1990s.

The George and Dragon was open for business where Waldocks Close is now. The Red Lion, situated on the corner of Church Lane and Gold Street is now, like the rest of the 'old' pubs a home. The Five Bells situated on the High Street opposite the bottom end of Gold Street closed for business in December 2008 and has been redeveloped into a home. Between the Five Bells and the Fox and Hounds stood "The Boot", now a home. There was also a tiny pub, The Swan, halfway along the High street, which closed in the 1960s. The last remaining pub in the village is the Fox and Hounds located on The High Street.

=== Churches ===
Riseley currently only has one church, All Saints Riseley. The oldest part of this church, the south wall of the south aisle dates from the twelfth century. Riseley's church along with the rectory and some land in the village was once owned by the Knights Hospitallers.

A Methodist Church was built in the village in 1807 at a cost of £130. The Methodist Chapel, opposite The Barns, was rebuilt in the 1990s and now serves as a private residence.

Moravian and Baptist chapels were built in the village in 1810 and 1838, respectively. However these are all no longer used though there are two redundant Chapels in Riseley High Street. The Moravian chapel became, for many years, the Chapel Art Gallery and is in the High Street close to Maple Gardens. The site the Baptist chapel is now a grass amenity area opposite Riseley's only shop on the Keysoe Road/High Street junction. There only has a few gravestones remaining as an indicator of its past.

=== Other facilities ===
Riseley has a small police station staffed by Bedfordshire Police. Riseley also has a shop and a garage both situated on the High Street. Riseley also has a village playing field, opened in 1952, where Riseley Sports Football Club and also the village's cricket club play their home matches. Other facilities include a village hall, three Bed and Breakfasts, a care home for the elderly, and on the outskirts of the village a shooting range facility. The village also has numerous green spaces such as a nearby woods, ross meadow and numerous footpaths over fields.

There are many clubs and associations active in Riseley, including a Historical Association, Bowling Club, cricket, football and badminton clubs, amateur dramatics club, Women's Institute, as well as a local branch of the WEA.

== Demography ==
2001 UK census	Riseley (ward)	Bedford (local authority)	England
Total population	2,785	147,911	49,138,831
Population density (per km^{2})	44	331	407
Unemployed	1.8%	3.1%	3.4%
Long-term illness	13.7%	15.6%	17.9%
Good health	76%	71.4%	68.8%
Average age	40.4	37.8	38.6
Ethnic white	99%	86.9%	90.9%
Christian	78.9%	68.8%	71.8%
No religion	14.9%	14.9%	14.6%
Religion not stated	5.5%	8.8%	7.7%
Muslim	0%	3.3%	3.1%
Sikh	0%	1.9%	0.7%
Degree+ education	30%	21.8%	19.9%

The British census of 2001 found that Riseley had 486 households with a population of 1,284 with 633 being male and 651 being female. The census also found that the Riseley ward, which includes not only Riseley but some of the smaller villages which surround it, had a very low population density (persons per hectare) of only 0.44 which is nine times smaller than the national average. The 2001 census also found that there were no second homes in Riseley and that 3.7% of houses were unoccupied. As well as this 17% of houses were rented and 79% of houses were owned by their occupants. The census also found that the average age of a Riseley villager was 40.36. The census also found that the most common industry of employment for someone living in the Riseley ward was the Real estate, renting and business activities which accounted for 18%.

The census also revealed that Riseley was not very ethnically diverse with just over one per cent of the population being non-white; the entire local authority in which Riseley is situated is much more ethnically diverse with over ten per cent of the population being non-white. Recent research into child poverty in Bedford Borough has revealed that the Riseley ward has some of the lowest instances of child poverty in the whole of Bedford Borough with only seven per cent of children living in poverty, which makes the ward the fifth most prosperous (in terms of how little child poverty there is) ward in the Bedford Borough. However, in regards to barriers to services Riseley is the second most deprived area in Bedford borough no doubt owing to the village's relative isolation.

== Notable people ==
- Julia Jarman, children's author
- Robert Jacomb-Hood, civil engineer
- Matt Jackson, footballer
