= 2019 Bedford Borough Council election =

2019 local election in Bedford

- 2 May 2019

All 40 seats to Bedford Borough Council 21 seats needed for a majority
	First party	Second party	Third party
	LD	Con	Lab
Leader	Wendy Rider	Stephen Moon	Sue Oliver
Party	Liberal Democrats	Conservative	Labour
Leader's seat	Brickhill	Great Barford	Kempston North
Last election	9 seats, 19.4%	15 seats, 39.7%	14 seats, 27.5%
Seats won	15	11	11
Seat change	▲6	▼4	▼3
Popular vote	22,326	23,010	20,325
Percentage	30.3%	31.3%	27.6%
Swing	▲10.9%	▼8.4%	▼0.1%
	Fourth party	Fifth party
	Grn	Ind
Leader	none	Pat Olney
Party	Green	Independent
Leader's seat	N/A	Oakley (did not re-stand)
Last election	0 seats, 5.5%	2 seats, 1.8%
Seats won	2	1
Seat change	▲2	▼1
Popular vote	4,716	2,691
Percentage	6.4%	3.7%
Swing	▲0.9%	▲1.9%
- Map showing the winner in each ward for the 2019 Bedford Borough Council election
Council control before election
No overall control
Council control after election
No overall control (Lib Dem - Lab - Ind Coalition)

The 2019 Bedford Borough Council election took place on 2 May 2019 to elect members of Bedford Borough Council in England.

Bedford Borough Council has been under no overall control since 2010. The Conservatives defended fifteen seats, Labour defended fourteen, the Liberal Democrats defended nine and independent councillors defended two seats. Bedford is run by the directly elected Mayor of Bedford, who has been Liberal Democrat Dave Hodgson since 2009.

== Background ==
Bedford Borough Council held local elections on 2 May 2019 along with councils across England as part of the 2019 local elections. The council elects its members in all-out elections, with all its councillors up for election every four years. Councillors defending their seats in this election were previously elected in 2015. In that election, fifteen Conservative councillors, fourteen Labour councillors, nine Liberal Democrats councillors and two independent councillors were elected.

The same day Dave Hodgson (Liberal Democrat) was re-elected mayor in the 2019 Bedford Mayoral election.

== Summary ==
=== Election result ===
2019 Bedford Borough Council election
Party	Candidates	Seats	Gains	Losses	Net gain/loss	Seats %	Votes %	Votes	+/−
Liberal Democrats	40	15	6	0	▲6	37.5	30.3	22,326	+10.9
Conservative	38	11	0	4	▼4	27.5	31.3	23,010	–8.4
Labour	39	11	1	4	▼3	27.5	27.6	20,325	–0.1
Green	15	2	2	0	▲2	5.0	6.4	4,716	+0.9
Independent	3	1	0	1	▼1	2.5	3.7	2,691	+1.9
UKIP	2	0	0	0	Steady	0.0	0.5	394	–4.5
Renew	1	0	0	0	Steady	0.0	0.2	161	N/A

=== Council composition ===
Prior to the election the composition of the council was:

↓
15	14	9	2
Conservative	Labour	Liberal; Democrats	Ind

After the election the composition of the council was:

↓
15	11	11	2	1
Liberal Democrat	Labour	Conservative	Green	Ind

== Ward results ==
Incumbent councillors are marked with an asterisk (*).

=== Brickhill ===
Brickhill (2 seats)
Party	Candidate	Votes	%	±%
Liberal Democrats	Wendy Rider*	1,756	61.5	+21.1
Liberal Democrats	Charles Royden*	1,756	61.5	+16.0
Conservative	Nigel Haughton	524	18.4	−8.0
Conservative	Matt Stanbra	404	14.2	−4.9
Labour	Cathrine Ward	317	11.1	−5.5
Labour	Sudesh Rani	291	10.2	−6.0
Green	Tim Retout	253	8.9	+0.7
Majority		0	0.0	
Turnout			43.6	
Liberal Democrats hold		Swing		
Liberal Democrats hold		Swing		
Registered electors		6,667		

=== Bromham and Biddenham ===
Bromham and Biddenham (2 seats)
Party	Candidate	Votes	%	±%
Conservative	Roger Rigby*	1,607	64.2	−8.4
Conservative	Jon Gambold*	1,565	62.5	−1.1
Liberal Democrats	Samuel Matthews	450	18.0	+11.0
Liberal Democrats	Stelios Mores	386	15.4	+3.8
Labour	Gordon Charlton	307	12.3	−5.8
Labour	Ollie Charlton	288	11.5	−5.5
Majority		42	0.9	
Turnout			43.3	
Conservative hold		Swing		
Conservative hold		Swing		
Registered electors		5,959		

=== Castle ===
Castle (2 seats)
Party	Candidate	Votes	%	±%
Green	Lucy Bywater	957	45.0	+29.2
Green	Ben Foley	732	34.4	+22.9
Labour	Luigi Reale*	690	32.4	+7.3
Labour	Louise Whatham	507	23.8	+3.3
Conservative	Karen Boyes	416	19.6	−9.1
Conservative	Robert Rigby	340	16.0	−6.7
Liberal Democrats	Lorna Marchant	145	6.8	+1.5
Liberal Democrats	Pat Wood	91	4.3	+0.2
Majority		225	5.8	
Turnout			33.5	−26.5
Green gain from Conservative		Swing		
Green gain from Labour		Swing		
Registered electors		6,395		

=== Cauldwell ===
Cauldwell (2 seats)
Party	Candidate	Votes	%	±%
Labour	Abu Sultan	1,033	50.2	+0.3
Labour	Fouzia Zamir	970	47.1	+3.0
Conservative	Mohammed Islam	527	25.6	+8.9
Liberal Democrats	Jacob Bale	342	16.6	+10.5
Liberal Democrats	Joy Winder	294	14.3	+10.0
Green	Kim Haskins	284	13.8	+7.3
Majority		63	1.8	
Turnout			29	
Labour hold		Swing		
Labour hold		Swing		
Registered electors		7,319		

=== Clapham ===
Clapham
Party	Candidate	Votes	%	±%
Conservative	Jane Walker*	723	63.6	+14.1
Labour	Lynne Wady	175	15.4	−6.8
Renew	Eric Cooper	161	14.2	N/A
Liberal Democrats	Stephen Rutherford	77	6.8	+2.1
Majority		548	48.2	
Turnout			33.8	
Conservative hold		Swing		
Registered electors		3,526		

=== De Parys ===
De Parys (2 seats)
Party	Candidate	Votes	%	±%
Liberal Democrats	Henry Vann*	1,178	58.1	+26.0
Liberal Democrats	David Sawyer*	1,125	55.5	+24.4
Conservative	Robin Illingworth	510	25.1	−3.8
Conservative	Andrea Spice	456	22.5	−6.7
Labour	Conny Smith	244	12.0	−5.7
Labour	Laurence Turner	209	10.3	−5.4
Majority		53	1.4	
Turnout			40.4	
Liberal Democrats hold		Swing		
Liberal Democrats hold		Swing		
Registered electors		5,119		

=== Eastcotts ===
Eastcotts
Party	Candidate	Votes	%	±%
Liberal Democrats	Sarah-Jayne Gallagher*	676	62.4	+14.8
Conservative	Sam Ancliff	215	19.9	−12.1
Labour	Mansoor Nasir	192	17.7	−2.7
Majority		461	42.6	
Turnout		1,083	31.7	
Liberal Democrats hold		Swing		
Registered electors		3,611		

=== Elstow and Stewartby ===
Elstow and Stewartby
Party	Candidate	Votes	%	±%
Liberal Democrats	Tim Hill*	1,062	79.5	+32.9
Conservative	Jade Ancliff	157	11.8	−16.2
Labour	Anne Saunders	117	8.8	−8.8
Majority		905	67.7	
Turnout			36.1	
Liberal Democrats hold		Swing		
Registered electors		3,848		

=== Goldington ===
Goldington (2 seats)
Party	Candidate	Votes	%	±%
Liberal Democrats	Tim Caswell	882	37.3	+12.9
Liberal Democrats	Christine McHugh	871	36.8	+14.2
Labour	Anthony Forth*	805	34.1	+0.7
Labour	Jade Uko*	726	30.7	+5.9
Conservative	Jenny Hedworth	277	11.7	−12.7
Conservative	Philip Merryman	264	11.2	−3.4
UKIP	Adrian Haynes	202	8.5	−8.6
Green	Philippa Fleming	133	5.6	±0.0
Green	Jennifer Foley	122	5.2	N/A
Majority		11	0.3	
Turnout			33.7	
Liberal Democrats gain from Labour		Swing		
Liberal Democrats gain from Labour		Swing		
Registered electors		7,135		

=== Great Barford ===
Great Barford (2 seats)
Party	Candidate	Votes	%	±%
Conservative	Stephen Moon*	1,392	56.4	−2.9
Conservative	Phillippa Martin-Moran-Bryant	1,090	44.2	−6.6
Liberal Democrats	Linda Carlton	591	23.9	+6.1
Liberal Democrats	Mark Fitzpatrick	554	22.4	+8.0
Green	Tobias Waltham	368	14.9	−1.5
Labour	Pauline Webb	222	9.0	N/A
Labour	Silas Wady	178	7.2	N/A
Majority		302	6.9	
Turnout			38.9	
Conservative hold		Swing		
Conservative hold		Swing		
Registered electors		6,437		

=== Harpur ===
Harpur (2 seats)
Party	Candidate	Votes	%	±%
Labour	Colleen Atkins*	1,217	57.4	−3.5
Labour	Louise Jackson*	1,022	48.2	+3.5
Independent	David Allen	395	18.6	+9.4
Liberal Democrats	Marion Zebedee-Topham	337	15.9	+8.3
Conservative	Jason Whaley	285	13.4	−12.9
Liberal Democrats	Alexandra Williams	252	11.9	+6.0
Conservative	Phoebe Kirk-Fraiser	250	11.8	−6.6
Majority		195	5.2	
Turnout			34.4	
Labour hold		Swing		
Labour hold		Swing		
Registered electors		6,293		

=== Harrold ===
Harrold
Party	Candidate	Votes	%	±%
Conservative	Alison Foster*	1,054	67.7	−6.9
Green	Gary Lloyd	311	20.0	+4.0
Labour	John Dawson	102	6.5	N/A
Liberal Democrats	Daniel Norton	91	5.8	−3.6
Majority		743	47.7	
Turnout			45.8	
Conservative hold		Swing		
Registered electors		3,289		

=== Kempston Central and East ===
Kempston Central and East (2 seats)
Party	Candidate	Votes	%	±%
Labour	Kay Burley	879	53.9	+22.5
Labour	Mohammed Nawaz*	807	49.5	+15.9
Conservative	Richard Hyde	533	32.7	−4.3
Conservative	Liam Rees	399	24.5	+1.0
Liberal Democrats	Hannah Farthing	180	11.0	+3.5
Liberal Democrats	Sarika Shah	125	7.7	+2.9
Majority		72	2.5	
Turnout			31.2	
Labour gain from Conservative		Swing		
Labour hold		Swing		
Registered electors		5,490		

=== Kempston North ===
Kempston North
Party	Candidate	Votes	%	±%
Labour	Sue Oliver*	498	47.3	+0.2
Conservative	Kathy Stone	423	40.2	−3.6
Green	Alison Parker	83	7.9	+1.4
Liberal Democrats	George Flaxman	48	4.6	+2.0
Majority		75	7.1	
Turnout			36.1	
Labour hold		Swing		
Registered electors		3,014		

=== Kempston Rural ===
Kempston Rural
Party	Candidate	Votes	%	±%
Conservative	Jim Weir	860	42.7	−27.4
Liberal Democrats	Steve Gallagher	736	36.6	+25.0
Labour	Ashley Frith	251	12.5	−5.8
Green	Ann Hagen	166	8.2	N/A
Majority		124	6.2	
Turnout			34.5	
Conservative hold		Swing		
Registered electors		5,963		

=== Kempston South ===
Kempston South
Party	Candidate	Votes	%	±%
Labour	Carl Meader*	1,000	83.5	+14.2
Conservative	Barry Ryan	157	13.1	−12.6
Liberal Democrats	Conrad Longmore	41	3.4	+0.9
Majority		843	70.4	
Turnout			37.4	
Labour hold		Swing		
Registered electors		3,290		

=== Kempston West ===
Kempston West
Party	Candidate	Votes	%	±%
Labour	James Valentine	631	52.1	+9.5
Conservative	Matt McCarthy	493	40.7	+7.5
Liberal Democrats	Bipinchandra Shah	87	7.2	+2.8
Majority		138	11.4	
Turnout			31.8	
Labour hold		Swing		
Registered electors		3,916		

=== Kingsbrook ===
Kingsbrook (2 seats)
Party	Candidate	Votes	%	±%
Liberal Democrats	Patrick Solomon	840	41.6	+16.2
Liberal Democrats	Dean Crofts	830	41.1	+20.4
Labour	James Saunders*	700	34.7	−5.6
Labour	Wendie Harvey	583	28.9	+5.5
Conservative	Martine Moon	256	12.7	−2.6
Green	Isabelle Sykes	204	10.1	+3.4
Majority		10	0.3	
Turnout			30.2	
Liberal Democrats gain from Labour		Swing		
Liberal Democrats hold		Swing		
Registered electors		6,867		

=== Newnham ===
Newnham (2 seats)
Party	Candidate	Votes	%	±%
Liberal Democrats	Hilde Hendrickx	894	35.8	+18.9
Liberal Democrats	Jake Sampson	795	31.9	+15.5
Conservative	John Mingay*	751	30.1	−8.4
Conservative	Alison Crook	687	27.5	−1.5
Labour	Shane Kelly	421	16.9	−7.9
Labour	Ceciliah Chigwada	414	16.6	−2.4
Green	Richard Baker	387	15.5	+7.2
Green	Brant Tilds	249	10.0	+4.9
Majority		99	2.2	
Turnout			43.6	
Liberal Democrats gain from Conservative		Swing		
Liberal Democrats gain from Conservative		Swing		
Registered electors		5,775		

=== Oakley ===
Oakley
Party	Candidate	Votes	%	±%
Liberal Democrats	Jon Abbott	887	57.7	+54.1
Conservative	Andrew Senior	575	37.4	−2.0
Labour	Ian Bagueley	76	4.9	−1.7
Majority		312	20.3	
Turnout			52.2	
Liberal Democrats gain from Independent		Swing		
Registered electors		3,052		

=== Putnoe ===
Putnoe (2 seats)
Party	Candidate	Votes	%	±%
Liberal Democrats	Michael Headley*	1,731	63.9	+18.6
Liberal Democrats	Max Royden	1,351	49.8	+14.3
Conservative	Dawn Allen	724	26.7	−5.9
Conservative	Mike Seamarks	526	19.4	−5.5
Labour	Lila Begum	238	8.8	−4.4
Labour Co-op	Graham Tranquada	216	8.0	−4.0
Green	Kate Retout	203	7.5	+1.3
Majority		380	7.6	
Turnout			45.6	
Liberal Democrats hold		Swing		
Liberal Democrats hold		Swing		
Registered electors		6,072		

=== Queens Park ===
Queens Park (2 seats)
Party	Candidate	Votes	%	±%
Labour	Nesreen Akhtar	1,507	48.8	−5.0
Labour	Mohammed Masud*	1,291	41.8	−8.0
Independent	Taru Miah	1,290	41.7	N/A
Conservative	Abdul Ahmed	392	12.7	−20.2
Green	Hannah Jones	264	8.5	+0.8
Conservative	June Kuria	199	6.4	−18.8
Liberal Democrats	Michael Pattison	108	3.5	−0.1
Liberal Democrats	Janet Trengrove	96	3.1	+0.3
Majority		216	4.2	
Turnout			49.8	
Labour hold		Swing		
Labour hold		Swing		
Registered electors		6,244		

=== Riseley ===
Riseley
Party	Candidate	Votes	%	±%
Conservative	Martin Towler*	823	60.5	+2.5
Labour	Martyn Wady	352	25.9	+14.6
Liberal Democrats	Liam Martin-Day	185	13.6	+6.8
Majority		471	34.6	
Turnout			50.1	
Conservative hold		Swing		
Registered electors		2,828		

=== Sharnbrook ===
Sharnbrook
Party	Candidate	Votes	%	±%
Independent	Doug McMurdo*	1,006	64.1	+21.6
Conservative	Martin Quince	403	25.7	−10.5
Liberal Democrats	Bernadette Walsh-Mason	91	5.8	+1.8
Labour	Paul Barton	69	4.4	−6.5
Majority		603	38.4	
Turnout			49.9	
Independent hold		Swing		
Registered electors		3,239		

=== Wilshamstead ===
Wilshamstead
Party	Candidate	Votes	%	±%
Conservative	Graeme Coombes*	992	73.8	+1.0
Labour	Saqhib Ali	212	15.8	−0.6
Liberal Democrats	Malcolm Smith	140	10.4	−0.4
Majority		780	58.0	
Turnout			34.8	
Conservative hold		Swing		
Registered electors		3,992		

=== Wootton ===
Wootton
Party	Candidate	Votes	%	±%
Conservative	John Wheeler*	861	57.1	+16.2
Liberal Democrats	Peter Stephens	273	18.1	−2.0
UKIP	Bill Hall	192	12.7	−8.8
Labour	Adrien Breadmore	181	12.0	+1.8
Majority		588	39.0	
Turnout			32.4	
Conservative hold		Swing		
Registered electors		4,776		

=== Wyboston ===
Wyboston
Party	Candidate	Votes	%	±%
Conservative	Tom Wootton*	900	71.5	−2.0
Liberal Democrats	Derek Eyre	359	28.5	+14.1
Majority		541	43.0	
Turnout			42.1	
Conservative hold		Swing		
Registered electors		3,107		

== Changes 2019–2023 ==
- November 2021: Sarah Gallagher, elected as a Liberal Democrat councillor for Eastcotts, joined the Conservative Party.
- 23 February 2023: Patrick Solomon, a Liberal Democrat councillor for Kingsbrook, died, leaving the seat vacant.
- 30 March 2023: Stephen Moon, a Conservative councillor for Great Barford, died, leaving the seat vacant.
