= 2007 Bedford Borough Council election =

2007 UK local government election

Results of the 2007 Bedford Borough Council election

The 2007 Bedford Borough Council election took place on 3 May 2007 to elect members of Bedford Borough Council in England. This was on the same day as other local elections.

== Summary ==
=== Election result ===
2007 Bedford Borough Council election
Party	This election			Full council			This election		
Party	Seats	Net	Seats %	Other	Total	Total %	Votes	Votes %	+/−
Conservative	7	▲2	36.8	12	19	35.2	13,958	38.2	+2.6
Liberal Democrats	7	▲1	36.8	9	16	29.6	9,616	26.3	–0.9
Labour	3	Steady	15.8	9	12	22.2	5,903	16.1	–5.4
Independent	1	▼2	5.3	3	4	7.4	1,233	3.4	–4.5
Better Bedford Party	1	▼1	5.3	2	3	5.6	4,982	13.6	+7.6
Green	0	Steady	0.0	0	0	0.0	873	2.4	+0.4

== Ward results ==
=== Brickhill ===
Brickhill
Party	Candidate	Votes	%	±%
Liberal Democrats	Charles Royden	1,758	53.5	+15.6
Conservative	Nigel Haughton	1,163	35.4	−9.6
Labour	Brian Anderson	232	7.1	+0.4
Better Bedford Party	Steven Mitchell	133	4.0	−4.8
Majority		595	18.1	
Turnout		3,286	50.1	
Liberal Democrats gain from Conservative		Swing		

=== Bromham ===
Bromham
Party	Candidate	Votes	%	±%
Conservative	Robert Rigby*	1,794	69.0	−1.2
Liberal Democrats	Stelios Mores	305	11.7	+1.2
Labour	Nicholas Luder	280	10.8	+1.8
Green	Lucy Bywater	113	4.3	N/A
Better Bedford Party	Mary Fogg	109	4.2	−6.2
Majority		1,489	57.3	
Turnout		2,601	43.4	
Conservative hold		Swing		

=== Carlton ===
Carlton
Party	Candidate	Votes	%	±%
Independent	Victor Brandon*	953	63.4	−17.8
Conservative	Gordon Williams	359	23.9	+14.7
Liberal Democrats	David Robertson	121	8.1	+2.7
Labour	Stephen Poole	70	4.7	+0.5
Majority		594	44.9	
Turnout		1,503	56.0	
Independent hold		Swing		

=== Castle ===
Castle
Party	Candidate	Votes	%	±%
Better Bedford Party	Margaret Davey*	1,162	47.7	+1.5
Labour	Laurence Evans	479	19.7	−15.2
Conservative	David Fletcher	381	15.7	+5.0
Liberal Democrats	Patrick Clements	274	11.3	+3.1
Green	Saul Keyworth	138	5.7	N/A
Majority		683	28.0	
Turnout		2,434	39.3	
Better Bedford Party hold		Swing		

=== Cauldwell ===
Cauldwell
Party	Candidate	Votes	%	±%
Labour	Christopher Black*	789	40.1	−10.5
Conservative	Katherine Stacey	491	25.0	+13.7
Liberal Democrats	Andrew Gerard	364	18.5	+4.4
Better Bedford Party	Farhana Ali	225	11.4	−12.6
Green	Justina McLennan	97	4.9	N/A
Majority		298	15.1	
Turnout		1,966	32.0	
Labour hold		Swing		

=== Clapham ===
Clapham
Party	Candidate	Votes	%	±%
Conservative	Frederick Sparrow	762	42.4	+18.8
Better Bedford Party	Douglas Tomkins	551	30.7	N/A
Liberal Democrats	Linda Jack	258	14.4	+10.1
Labour	Frank Garrick	166	9.2	+0.2
Green	Christopher Davies	60	3.3	N/A
Majority		211	11.7	
Turnout		1,797	38.8	
Conservative gain from Independent		Swing		

=== De Parys ===
De Parys
Party	Candidate	Votes	%	±%
Liberal Democrats	David Sawyer*	735	46.6	+8.0
Conservative	Catherine Dale	543	34.5	−1.9
Better Bedford Party	Linda-Marie Mitchell	164	10.4	−6.3
Labour	Sudaxshina Murdan	134	8.5	−1.2
Majority		192	12.1	
Turnout		1,576	39.5	
Liberal Democrats hold		Swing		

=== Goldington ===
Goldington
Party	Candidate	Votes	%	±%
Liberal Democrats	Paul Smith*	1,102	48.0	−6.6
Conservative	Pauline Stewart	470	20.5	+11.0
Labour	June McDonald	377	16.4	±0.0
Better Bedford Party	Angela Parker	346	15.1	−4.5
Majority		632	27.5	
Turnout		2,295	36.2	
Liberal Democrats hold		Swing		

=== Great Barford ===
Great Barford
Party	Candidate	Votes	%	±%
Conservative	Carole Ellis*	1,236	66.6	+13.2
Liberal Democrats	Sarah-Jayne Holland	346	18.7	+10.5
Better Bedford Party	Jane Richardson	137	7.4	−23.4
Labour	Franca Garrick	136	7.3	−0.3
Majority		890	47.9	
Turnout		1,855	45.5	
Conservative hold		Swing		

=== Harpur ===
Harpur
Party	Candidate	Votes	%	±%
Labour	Ian Nicholls*	959	41.1	−5.2
Conservative	Mohammed Kabir	817	35.0	+8.9
Better Bedford Party	Jonathan Baker	236	10.1	−2.6
Liberal Democrats	Michael Murphy	208	8.9	−1.0
Green	Jennifer Foley	114	4.9	±0.0
Majority		142	6.1	
Turnout		2,334	39.6	
Labour hold		Swing		

=== Kempston South ===
Kempston South
Party	Candidate	Votes	%	±%
Labour	Carl Meader*	962	47.4	+1.8
Conservative	Steven Collins	830	40.9	+32.2
Liberal Democrats	Michele Bonito	166	8.2	−0.5
Green	Anthony Upton	71	3.5	+1.6
Majority		132	6.5	
Turnout		2,029	36.4	
Labour hold		Swing		

=== Kingsbrook ===
Kingsbrook
Party	Candidate	Votes	%	±%
Liberal Democrats	Anita Gerard*	995	45.9	+0.6
Conservative	Gurmit Sandhu	487	22.5	+13.4
Labour	Keiran Pedley	485	22.4	−8.4
Better Bedford Party	Maxine Ali	109	5.0	−9.7
Green	Paul Taylor	93	4.3	N/A
Majority		508	23.4	
Turnout		2,169	33.3	
Liberal Democrats hold		Swing		

=== Putnoe ===
Putnoe
Party	Candidate	Votes	%	±%
Liberal Democrats	Salyanne Smith	1,327	42.3	−6.9
Liberal Democrats	Myrtle Stewardson*	1,225	39.1	−10.1
Conservative	Janet Lehain	930	29.6	+12.8
Conservative	Mark Lehain	916	29.2	+12.4
Better Bedford Party	Raymond Hostler	479	15.3	−3.5
Better Bedford Party	Susan Hayhurst	437	13.9	−4.9
Labour	Karandeep Garcha	237	7.6	+1.1
Labour	Rosemary Roome	228	7.3	+0.8
Green	David Maxwell	93	3.0	N/A
Majority		295	9.5	
Turnout		3,137	48.1	
Liberal Democrats hold		Swing		
Liberal Democrats hold		Swing		

=== Roxton ===
Roxton
Party	Candidate	Votes	%	±%
Conservative	Tom Wootton	770	74.2	+3.6
Liberal Democrats	Paul Stekelis	116	11.2	−7.6
Labour	Terence Carroll	82	7.9	−2.8
Better Bedford Party	Cecilia Thomas	70	6.7	−0.2
Majority		654	63.0	
Turnout		1,038	44.5	
Conservative hold		Swing		

=== Sharnbrook ===
Sharnbrook
Party	Candidate	Votes	%	±%
Conservative	Michael Hurley	623	48.5	+11.2
Better Bedford Party	Douglas McMurdo*	553	43.1	−11.1
Liberal Democrats	John Ryan	55	4.3	−0.4
Labour	Christina Holloway	53	4.1	+0.3
Majority		70	5.4	
Turnout		1,284	56.7	
Conservative gain from Better Bedford Party		Swing		

=== Turvey ===
Turvey
Party	Candidate	Votes	%	±%
Conservative	Mark Smith	697	69.8	−0.6
Liberal Democrats	Jacqueline Smithson	124	12.4	+2.7
Labour	Roger Barson	90	9.0	−0.3
Better Bedford Party	Michael Blackledge	88	8.8	−1.8
Majority		573	57.4	
Turnout		999	46.5	
Conservative hold		Swing		

=== Wilshamstead ===
Wilshamstead
Party	Candidate	Votes	%	±%
Conservative	Lynne Faulkner	689	42.7	+19.4
Independent	Anthony Hare*	460	28.5	−1.8
Better Bedford Party	Lloyd Allison	183	11.3	−6.7
Labour	Jane Owen	144	8.9	−0.6
Liberal Democrats	Conrad Longmore	137	8.5	−10.3
Majority		229	14.2	
Turnout		1,613	39.8	
Conservative gain from Independent		Swing		

=== Wootton ===
Wootton
Party	Candidate	Votes	%	±%
Liberal Democrats	Timothy Hill	667	38.9	−5.3
Conservative	John Keech	376	21.9	−14.1
Better Bedford Party	David Price	357	20.8	+9.7
UKIP	Robert Colman	177	10.3	N/A
Labour	Adrien Beardmore	92	5.4	−3.3
Green	Neil Foley	44	2.6	N/A
Majority		291	17.0	
Turnout		1,713	41.9	
Liberal Democrats hold		Swing		
