= 2015 Bedford Borough Council election =

2015 UK local government election

Results of the 2015 Bedford Borough Council election

The 2015 Bedford Borough Council election took place on 7 May 2015 to elect members of Bedford Borough Council in England. This was on the same day as other local elections.

== Overall results ==
Bedford local election result 2015
Party	Seats	Gains	Losses	Net gain/loss	Seats %	Votes %	Votes	+/−
Conservative	15	3	0	+3	37.5	39.73	45,874	+2.8
Labour	14	3	1	+2	35.0	27.48	31,738	-1.35
Liberal Democrats	9	0	3	-3	22.5	19.35	22,342	-6.33
Independent	2	0	2	-2	5.0	1.78	4,346	-4.06
Green	0	0	0	0	0.0	5.45	6,291	+4.27
UKIP	0	0	0	0	0.0	4.97	5,742	+4.69

A total of 115,477 valid votes were cast and there were 1,060 rejected ballots.
The turnout was 66.3%

== Council composition ==
Prior to the election the composition of the council was:

↓
12	12	12	4
Conservative	Labour	Liberal; Democrats	Ind

After the election the composition of the council was:

↓
15	14	9	2
Conservative	Labour	Liberal; Democrats	Ind

Ind - Independent

== Ward results ==
Incumbent councillors are denoted by an asterisk.

=== Brickhill ===
Brickhill (2 Seats)
Party	Candidate	Votes	%	±%
Liberal Democrats	Charles Royden*	2,123	45.54	−15.92
Liberal Democrats	Wendy Rider*	1,882	40.37	−12.44
Conservative	Olly Richbell	1,231	26.40	+0.19
Conservative	Rubina Shaikh	892	19.13	−3.85
Labour	Cathrine Ward	775	16.62	+3.91
Labour	Robert Frank Atkins	755	16.19	+6.80
Green	Sara Frances Browne	382	8.19	N/A
Majority		651	13.97	
Turnout		4,724	71.0	
Liberal Democrats hold		Swing		
Liberal Democrats hold		Swing		

=== Bromham and Biddenham ===
Bromham and Biddenham (2 Seats)
Party	Candidate	Votes	%	±%
Conservative	Roger Rigby*	2,730	72.55	+6.28
Conservative	Jon Gambold*	2,393	63.59	+0.66
Labour	Elizabeth Jane Luder	680	18.07	+0.48
Labour	Ashley Spencer Firth	638	16.95	+2.04
Liberal Democrats	Stelios Mores	436	11.59	+0.12
Liberal Democrats	Stephen John Rutherford	265	7.04	−0.28
Majority		1,713	45.52	
Turnout		3,822	66.0	
Conservative hold		Swing		
Conservative hold		Swing		

=== Castle ===
Castle (2 Seats)
Party	Candidate	Votes	%	±%
Conservative	David Stanton Fletcher	978	28.72	+3.10
Labour	Luigi Reale	853	25.05	+3.47
Conservative	Shish Miah	774	22.73	−1.45
Castle Ward Independent	Apu Bagchi*	753	22.11	−11.90
Labour	Mashuk Miah Ullah	698	20.50	−0.90
Castle Ward Independent	Caroline Sara Fensome*	678	19.91	−5.71
Green	Lucy Clare Bywater	539	15.83	+7.75
Green	Ben Foley	390	11.45	+7.50
Liberal Democrats	Muhmud Henry Rogers	181	5.32	−3.65
Liberal Democrats	Richard Rashid Rogers	140	4.11	−3.16
Independent	Ameer Shajahan Mohammed	64	1.88	N/A
Majority		79	2.32	
Turnout		3,437	60.0	
Conservative hold		Swing		
Labour gain from Independent		Swing		

=== Cauldwell ===
Cauldwell (2 Seats)
Party	Candidate	Votes	%	±%
Labour	Randolph Charles*	1,762	49.89	+3.55
Labour	Sue Oliver*	1,559	44.14	−2.63
Conservative	Darren Jason Russell	670	18.97	−0.69
Conservative	Nurul Islam	590	16.70	−1.11
UKIP	Janet Culley	477	13.51	N/A
Green	Esin Esat	228	6.46	N/A
Liberal Democrats	Jake Sale	216	6.12	−16.99
Liberal Democrats	Mohammad Sabir Rahman	153	4.33	−14.99
Independent	Aleksandr Zabolotnov	42	1.19	N/A
Majority		889	25.17	
Turnout		3,575	52.0	
Labour hold		Swing		
Labour hold		Swing		

=== Clapham ===
Clapham
Party	Candidate	Votes	%	±%
Conservative	Jane Anne Walker*	1,140	49.50	−9.78
Labour	Jenni Jackson	511	22.19	−8.76
UKIP	Peter Lund-Conlon	420	18.24	N/A
Green	Sarah Mingay	124	5.80	N/A
Liberal Democrats	John Robert Ryan	108	4.69	−5.08
Majority		629	27.31	
Turnout		2,303	67.0	
Conservative hold		Swing		

=== De Parys ===
De Parys (2 Seats)
Party	Candidate	Votes	%	±%
Liberal Democrats	Henry Paul Vann*	1,040	32.08	−4.48
Liberal Democrats	David Alexander Sawyer*	1,007	31.06	−13.68
Conservative	Adrian Alexander Lennox-Lamb	948	29.24	−3.31
Conservative	Robin Calverey Illingworth	937	28.90	−3.90
Labour	Monika Golebiewska	573	17.67	+0.73
Labour	Louise Whatham	509	15.70	−0.83
UKIP	John Lathaen	342	10.55	N/A
Green	Alex Charlton	224	6.91	+1.67
Green	Alex Willmott	176	5.43	N/A
Independent	John Lloyd	99	3.05	N/A
Majority		59	1.82	
Turnout		3,288	64.0	
Liberal Democrats hold		Swing		
Liberal Democrats hold		Swing		

=== Eastcotts ===
Eastcotts
Party	Candidate	Votes	%	±%
Liberal Democrats	Sarah Holland*	804	47.66	−16.66
Conservative	Michael Peter Abbott	539	31.95	+11.49
Labour	James Alexander Grady	344	20.39	+5.17
Majority		265	15.71	
Turnout		1,687	62.0	
Liberal Democrats hold		Swing		

=== Elstow & Stewartby ===
Elstow & Stewartby
Party	Candidate	Votes	%	±%
Liberal Democrats	Tim Hill*	941	46.61	+8.45
Conservative	Margaret Jean Turner	565	27.98	−5.07
Labour	Susan Ann Hoskin	355	17.58	+4.25
Independent	Tony Hare	158	7.83	−7.63
Majority		376	18.63	
Turnout		2,019	64.0	
Liberal Democrats hold		Swing		

=== Goldington ===
Goldington
Party	Candidate	Votes	%	±%
Labour	Anthony James Forth	1,291	33.38	+5.40
Labour	Jade Chelsea Uko	961	24.84	−1.42
Conservative	Phillippa Anne Martin-Moran	945	24.43	−0.3
Liberal Democrats	Lorna Rose Marchant	942	24.35	−18.97
Liberal Democrats	Richard Jefferies Harrison	874	22.60	−17.88
UKIP	Adrian John Haynes	663	17.14	N/A
Conservative	Zulika Maria Wightman	564	14.58	−5.91
Green	Brant Carl Tilds	218	5.64	N/A
Majority		16	0.41	
Turnout		3,907	60.0	
Labour gain from Liberal Democrats		Swing		
Labour gain from Liberal Democrats		Swing		

=== Great Barford ===
Great Barford (2 Seats)
Party	Candidate	Votes	%	±%
Conservative	Stephen Hellier Moon*	2,615	59.27	−4.29
Conservative	Sheryl Lesley Maxwell Corp	2,242	50.82	−17.75
Liberal Democrats	Stephen James Lawson	785	17.79	+3.43
Green	Mark Bowler	732	16.59	N/A
Liberal Democrats	Paul Stekelis	634	14.37	+1.15
Majority		1,457	33.03	
Turnout		4,511	72.0	
Conservative hold		Swing		
Conservative hold		Swing		

=== Harpur ===
Harpur (2 Seats)
Party	Candidate	Votes	%	±%
Labour	Colleen Atkins*	1,793	60.92	+2.49
Labour	Louise King*	1,316	44.72	+2.76
Conservative	Andrea Clare Spice	775	26.33	−3.18
Conservative	Sanjit Kaur Gill Chowdrey	541	18.38	−6.29
UKIP	Derek John Few	323	10.98	N/A
Independent	David John Allen	272	9.24	N/A
Liberal Democrats	Paul Martin Whitehead	224	7.61	+0.95
Green	Jen Foley	210	7.14	−0.70
Liberal Democrats	Ripal Pranesh Patel	175	5.95	−2.84
Green	Racheall Monton	153	5.20	−1.73
Majority		541	9.36	
Turnout		2,975	51.0	
Labour hold		Swing		
Labour hold		Swing		

=== Harrold ===
Harrold
Party	Candidate	Votes	%	±%
Conservative	Alison Jane Foster	1,762	74.60	+27.77
Green	Gary Nicholas Lloyd	377	15.96	N/A
Liberal Democrats	Joy Rose Winder	223	9.44	−34.75
Majority		1,385	58.64	
Turnout		2,362	75.0	
Conservative hold		Swing		

=== Kempston Central and East ===
Kempston Central and East (2 Seats)
Party	Candidate	Votes	%	±%
Conservative	Anthony Frank John Boutall	1,210	37.01	+2.61
Labour	Mohammed Nawaz*	1,034	31.63	−6.85
Labour	James Emmanuel Valentine*	1,028	31.45	−11.43
Conservative	Kuldip Singh	769	23.52	+5.86
UKIP	Nicky Attenborough	764	23.37	−9.41
Green	Richard James Baker	304	9.30	N/A
Liberal Democrats	Terry Gasson	245	7.49	+0.30
Liberal Democrats	Bipin Shah	158	4.83	−1.89
Majority		6	0.18	
Turnout		3,310	61.0	
Conservative gain from Labour		Swing		
Labour hold		Swing		

=== Kempston North ===
Kempston North
Party	Candidate	Votes	%	±%
Labour	Shan Hunt*	870	47.08	−9.71
Conservative	Matt McCarthy	810	43.83	+7.51
Green	Alex Sebastian Jones	120	6.49	N/A
Liberal Democrats	Mamun Islam	48	2.60	−4.28
Majority		60	3.25	
Turnout		1,848	64.0	
Labour hold		Swing		

=== Kempston Rural ===
Kempston Rural
Party	Candidate	Votes	%	±%
Conservative	Mark William Smith*	2,074	70.14	+12.64
Labour	Shah Shanoor Miah	540	18.26	+1.00
Liberal Democrats	Conrad Holden Longmore	343	11.60	−4.14
Majority		1,634	51.88	
Turnout		2,957	69.0	
Conservative hold		Swing		

=== Kempston South ===
Kempston South
Party	Candidate	Votes	%	±%
Labour	Carl Rex Meader	1,471	69.29	−6.34
Conservative	Sarah King McGee	545	25.67	+5.74
Green	Tim Crowhurst	54	2.54	N/A
Liberal Democrats	Philip Downing Standley	53	2.50	−1.94
Majority		926	43.62	
Turnout		2,123	67.0	
Labour hold		Swing		

=== Kempston West ===
Kempston West
Party	Candidate	Votes	%	±%
Labour	Will Hunt	956	42.58	−11.21
Conservative	Ryan Darren Michael Gray	746	33.23	−7.55
UKIP	Peter Hull	332	14.79	N/A
Green	Rosemary Josephine Elizabeth Wright	112	4.99	N/A
Liberal Democrats	Simon Paul Hart	99	4.41	−1.02
Majority		210	9.35	
Turnout		2,245	61.0	
Labour hold		Swing		

=== Kingsbrook ===
Kingsbrook
Party	Candidate	Votes	%	±%
Labour	James Saunders*	1,461	40.27	+1.21
Liberal Democrats	Anita Joan Gerard*	923	25.44	−12.25
Labour	Abu Sultan	848	23.37	−6.62
Liberal Democrats	Becky Guynn	751	20.70	−16.13
UKIP	Chris Billington	603	16.62	N/A
Conservative	Martine Moon	554	15.27	−2.73
Conservative	Shekh Sayed	456	12.57	−1.01
Green	Lynn Herron	242	6.67	N/A
Majority		75	2.07	
Turnout		3,664	55.0	
Labour hold		Swing		
Liberal Democrats hold		Swing		

=== Newnham ===
Newnham
Party	Candidate	Votes	%	±%
Conservative	John Kenneth Samuel Mingay*	1,516	38.48	+1.83
Conservative	Giovanni Carofano	1,143	29.01	+1.14
Labour	Margaret Ann Badley	976	24.77	+4.26
Labour	June Aileen McDonald	749	19.01	+1.68
Liberal Democrats	Gordon Willey	666	16.90	−10.97
Liberal Democrats	Dean Gary Crofts	648	16.45	−6.78
UKIP	John Norman Robertson	382	9.70	N/A
UKIP	Domenico Canzoneri	361	9.16	N/A
Green	Janice Mary Jones	328	8.32	+1.78
Independent	Saverio Bongo	228	5.79	N/A
Green	George Lewis Murphy	200	5.08	N/A
Majority		167	4.24	
Turnout		3,980	69.0	
Conservative hold		Swing		
Conservative hold		Swing		

=== Oakley ===
Oakley
Party	Candidate	Votes	%	±%
Independent	Patricia Margaret Olney	955	41.20	−42.86
Conservative	Ade Clewlow	914	39.43	N/A
UKIP	Sebastian Sharpe	171	7.38	N/A
Labour	Anne Saunders	152	6.56	−2.64
Liberal Democrats	Daniel Millington Norton	84	3.62	−3.11
Green	David Peter Mingay	42	1.81	N/A
Majority		41	1.77	
Turnout		2,318	78.0	
Independent hold		Swing		

=== Putnoe ===
Putnoe (2 Seats)
Party	Candidate	Votes	%	±%
Liberal Democrats	Michael Paul Headley*	2,014	45.32	−13.58
Liberal Democrats	Rosemary Jean Bootiman	1,578	35.51	−10.68
Conservative	Peter Anthony Allen	1,447	32.56	+11.41
Conservative	Susan Mary Spratt	1,105	24.86	−3.11
Labour	Ceciliah Chigwada	588	13.23	−1.04
Labour	Graham John Tranquada	533	11.99	−1.55
Green	Rosie Layton	275	6.19	N/A
Majority		131	2.95	
Turnout		4,488	74.0	
Liberal Democrats hold		Swing		
Liberal Democrats hold		Swing		

=== Queens Park ===
Queens Park (2 Seats)
Party	Candidate	Votes	%	±%
Labour	Mohammad Yasin*	2,062	53.77	−6.54
Labour	Mohammed Masud*	1,947	50.77	+0.36
Conservative	Balal Shah	1,262	32.91	−6.55
Conservative	Muzakkir Hussain Khan	965	25.16	−0.46
Green	Hannah Mary Jones	297	7.74	N/A
Liberal Democrats	Dorothea Manar Rogers	138	3.60	+0.66
Liberal Democrats	Richard William Struck	108	2.82	−0.55
Majority		685	17.86	
Turnout		3,893	65.0	
Labour hold		Swing		
Labour hold		Swing		

=== Riseley ===
Riseley
Party	Candidate	Votes	%	±%
Conservative	Martin Edward James Towler	1,206	57.95	+31.19
UKIP	James Timkey	344	16.53	N/A
Labour	John Gerard Dawson	235	11.29	+4.13
Independent	Eileen Brenda Whitmore	154	7.40	N/A
Liberal Democrats	Patrick Solomon	142	6.83	+4.00
Majority		862	41.42	
Turnout		2,081	76.0	
Conservative gain from Independent		Swing		

=== Sharnbrook ===
Sharnbrook
Party	Candidate	Votes	%	±%
Independent	Doug McMurdo*	1,042	42.53	−16.63
Conservative	Robert Peter Tickle	886	36.16	+7.57
Labour	Susan Jane Caroline Aykin	266	10.86	+1.97
Green	Elisabeth Magda Evershed	158	6.45	N/A
Liberal Democrats	Janet Elizabeth Trengrove	98	4.00	+0.65
Majority		156	6.37	
Turnout		2,450	76.0	
Independent hold		Swing		

=== Wilshamstead ===
Wilshamstead
Party	Candidate	Votes	%	±%
Conservative	Graeme Stuart Coombes*	1,698	72.78	+8.68
Labour	Akm Masum	383	16.42	−2.58
Liberal Democrats	Steve Mason	252	10.80	−6.10
Majority		1,315	56.36	
Turnout		2,333	68.0	
Conservative hold		Swing		

=== Wootton ===
Wootton
Party	Candidate	Votes	%	±%
Conservative	John Stephen Wheeler	1,119	42.91	+4.47
UKIP	Bill Hall	560	21.47	+8.32
Liberal Democrats	Gareth Trevor Lloyd	525	20.13	−18.31
Labour	Ali Askor	266	10.20	−0.27
Green	Carlos Linnett	138	5.29	N/A
Majority		559	21.44	
Turnout		2,608	71.0	
Conservative gain from Liberal Democrats		Swing		

=== Wyboston ===
Wyboston
Party	Candidate	Votes	%	±%
Conservative	Tom Wootton*	1,618	73.48	+2.95
Liberal Democrats	Martin Joseph Kavanagh	316	14.35	+1.18
Green	Lisa Bradbury	268	12.17	N/A
Majority		1,302	59.13	
Turnout		2,202	73.0	
Conservative hold		Swing		
