= 2023 Bedford Borough Council election =

- 4 May 2023

All 46 seats to Bedford Borough Council 24 seats needed for a majority
- Turnout: 34.9%

	First party	Second party	Third party
Leader	Sue Oliver	Graeme Coombes	Dave Hodgson (Note: Dave Hodgson elected mayor, Christine McHugh group leader)
Party	Labour	Conservative	Liberal Democrats
Last election	11 seats, 27.6%	11 seats, 31.3%	15 seats, 30.3%
Seats won	14	13	13
Seat change	▲3	▲2	▼2
Popular vote	24,563	23,316	23,194
Percentage	29.4%	27.9%	27.7%
Swing	▲1.8%	▼3.4%	▼2.6%
	Fourth party	Fifth party	Sixth party
Leader	N/A	N/A	N/A
Party	Green	Independent	Vacant
Last election	2 seats, 6.4%	1 seat, 3.7%
Seats won	3	2	1
Seat change	▲1	▲1	▲1
Popular vote	6,786	5,479
Percentage	8.1%	6.5%
Swing	▲1.8%	▲2.8%
- Winner of each seat at the 2023 Bedford Borough Council election
Mayor before election
Dave Hodgson
Liberal Democrat
No overall control
Mayor after election
Tom Wootton
Conservative
No overall control

The 2023 Bedford Borough Council election took place on 4 May 2023, electing members of Bedford Borough Council in Bedfordshire, England. An election for the borough's directly-elected mayor took place at the same time. This was the same day as other local elections.

The whole council was up for election on new ward boundaries. The total number of seats increased by 6, from 40 to 46. Issues being debated by the candidates included the route of East West Rail through the town, with Government confirmation on the route still awaited at the time of the election.

The council remained under no overall control after the election. The Conservative candidate, Tom Wootton, won the mayoralty, defeating the Liberal Democrat incumbent, Dave Hodgson, who had held the post since 2009.

== Summary ==
=== Election result ===
2023 Bedford Borough Council election (new boundaries)
Party	Candidates	Seats	Gains	Losses	Net gain/loss	Seats %	Votes %	Votes	+/−
Labour	45	14	1	0	▲3	31.1	29.4	24,563	+1.8
Conservative	45	13	0	1	▲2	28.9	27.9	23,316	–3.4
Liberal Democrats	46	13	0	2	▼2	28.9	27.7	23,194	–2.6
Green	25	3	1	0	▲1	6.7	8.1	6,786	+1.7
Independent	9	2	1	0	▲1	4.4	6.5	5,479	+2.8
Reform	2	0	0	0	Steady	0.0	0.4	310	New
TUSC	1	0	0	0	Steady	0.0	<0.1	6	New
Communist	1	0	0	0	Steady	0.0	<0.1	5	New
Vacant	0	1	0	0	Steady	2.2	N/A	N/A	N/A

== Ward results ==
Official results were published by Bedford Borough Council as the count progressed. They were also reported live by the Bedford Independent and also reported by the Bedford Times and Citizen newspaper, initially through its website.

The Statement of Persons Nominated, which details the candidates standing in each ward, was released by Bedford Borough Council following the close of nominations on 5 April 2023.

=== Biddenham ===
Biddenham
Party	Candidate	Votes	%
Conservative	Jon Gambold*	442	44.4
Green	Adrian Spurrell	423	42.5
Labour	Christopher Howes	90	9.0
Liberal Democrats	Stelios Mores	40	4.0
Majority		19	1.9
Turnout		995	41.4
Registered electors		2,406	
Conservative win (new seat)			

=== Brickhill ===
Brickhill (2 seats)
Party	Candidate	Votes	%	±%
Liberal Democrats	Charles Royden*	1,208	50.3	–11.2
Liberal Democrats	Wendy Rider*	1,201	50.0	–11.5
Conservative	Gill Scott	645	26.8	+8.4
Conservative	Sharon Thompson	609	25.3	+11.1
Labour	Elizabeth Pugsley	380	15.8	+4.7
Labour	Warwick Mackie	352	14.6	+4.4
Green	Stephen Bywater	232	9.7	+0.8
Turnout		2,403	36.8	–6.8
Registered electors		6,531		
Liberal Democrats hold				
Liberal Democrats hold				

=== Bromham ===
Bromham (2 seats)
Party	Candidate	Votes	%
Conservative	Robert Rigby	1,061	47.2
Conservative	Dylan Simmons	1,055	46.9
Liberal Democrats	Richard Jones	449	20.0
Labour	Gordon Charlton	419	18.6
Labour	Ashley Frith	383	17.0
Green	Kathryn Hill	320	14.2
Liberal Democrats	Stephen Rutherford	230	10.2
Reform	Kathy Wallis	194	8.6
Turnout		2,248	39.0
Registered electors		5,764	
Conservative win (new seat)			
Conservative win (new seat)			

=== Castle and Newnham ===
Castle and Newnham (2 seats)
Party	Candidate	Votes	%
Green	Lucy Bywater*	1,689	63.3
Green	Paul Edmonds	1,157	43.3
Labour	Sam Blacklaws	626	23.4
Liberal Democrats	Hilde Hendrickx*	566	21.2
Liberal Democrats	Tom Pattinson	348	13.0
Conservative	Simon Briggs	295	11.0
Conservative	Josh Walker	284	10.6
Turnout		2,670	44.6
Registered electors		5,986	
Green win (new seat)			
Green win (new seat)			

=== Cauldwell ===
Cauldwell (3 seats)
Party	Candidate	Votes	%	±%
Labour	Fouzia Atiq*	1,331	62.1	+15.0
Labour	Abu Sultan*	1,137	53.1	+2.9
Labour	Harish Thapar	1,127	52.6	N/A
Conservative	Suresh Sunda	498	23.2	–2.4
Conservative	Spenser Groves	433	20.2	N/A
Conservative	Ionut Milea	388	18.1	N/A
Liberal Democrats	Charlotte Bagnall	279	13.0	–3.6
Liberal Democrats	Eve McGrath	240	11.2	–3.1
Green	Susan Throssell	224	10.5	–3.3
Liberal Democrats	Tristan Steyn	173	8.1	N/A
Turnout		2,142	26.0	–3.0
Registered electors		8,238		
Labour hold				
Labour hold				
Labour win (new seat)				

=== Clapham and Oakley ===
Clapham and Oakley (2 seats)
Party	Candidate	Votes	%
Conservative	Jane Walker*	1,101	55.5
Liberal Democrats	Jonathan Abbott*	808	40.7
Conservative	Phillipa Simms	795	40.1
Liberal Democrats	John Manning	539	27.2
Labour	June McDonald	200	10.1
Labour	Thoufique Ali	175	8.8
Green	Lynne Gray	163	8.2
Turnout		1,985	37.9
Registered electors		5,328	
Conservative win (new seat)			
Liberal Democrats win (new seat)			

=== De Parys ===
De Parys (2 seats)
Party	Candidate	Votes	%	±%
Liberal Democrats	Henry Vann*	1,044	55.4	–2.7
Liberal Democrats	David Sawyer*	968	51.4	–4.1
Conservative	Jason Gordon	369	19.6	–5.5
Conservative	Freddie Linsley	347	18.4	–4.1
Labour	Shaun Bowman	322	17.1	+5.1
Labour	Mohammad Islam	268	14.2	+3.9
Green	Harrison Marley	230	12.2	N/A
Turnout		1,884	35.3	–5.1
Registered electors		5,383		
Liberal Democrats hold				
Liberal Democrats hold				

=== Goldington ===
Goldington (2 seats)
Party	Candidate	Votes	%	±%
Liberal Democrats	Timothy Caswell*	792	45.6	+8.3
Liberal Democrats	Christine McHugh*	729	42.0	+6.0
Labour	Shane Kelly	578	33.3	–0.8
Labour	Cathrine Ward	505	29.1	–1.6
Conservative	Bernard Jones	257	14.8	+3.1
Green	Philippa Fleming	136	7.8	+2.2
Reform	Adrian Haynes	116	6.7	N/A
Turnout		1,736	29.3	–4.4
Registered electors		5,925		
Liberal Democrats hold				
Liberal Democrats hold				

=== Great Barford ===
Great Barford
Party	Candidate	Votes	%	±%
Conservative	Phillippa Martin-Moran-Bryant*	781	69.9	+15.8
Green	Toby Waltham	160	14.3	±0.0
Liberal Democrats	Malcolm Smith	103	9.2	–13.7
Labour	Harvey Stimson	73	6.5	–2.1
Majority		621	55.6	N/A
Turnout		1,117	40.9	+2.0
Registered electors		2,752		
Conservative hold		Swing	▲7.9	

=== Great Denham ===
Great Denham
Party	Candidate	Votes	%
Conservative	Jim Weir*	623	57.1
Liberal Democrats	Joanna Szaub-Newton	295	27.0
Labour	Mohammad Teahleel	132	12.1
Green	Tim Crowhurst	42	3.8
Majority		328	30.1
Turnout		1,092	34.8
Registered electors		3,158	
Conservative win (new seat)			

=== Greyfriars ===
Greyfriars
Party	Candidate	Votes	%
Green	Ben Foley*	274	36.2
Labour	Sudesh Rani	223	29.5
Independent	Syedur Rahman	144	19.0
Conservative	Karen Boyes	67	8.9
Liberal Democrats	Nigel Spencer	43	5.7
TUSC	Paul Mannion	6	0.8
Majority		51	6.7
Turnout		757	26.5
Registered electors		2,898	
Green win (new seat)			

=== Harpur ===
Harpur (2 seats)
Party	Candidate	Votes	%	±%
Labour	Colleen Atkins*	1,178	60.3	+2.9
Labour	Zara Layne	977	50.0	+1.8
Conservative	Steve Spring	302	15.4	+2.0
Conservative	Elizabeth Akinwande	276	14.1	+2.3
Independent	David Allen	258	13.2	–5.4
Green	Jonathan Westwood	165	8.4	N/A
Green	Barry Freeman	160	8.2	N/A
Liberal Democrats	Martin Kavanagh	158	8.1	–7.8
Liberal Democrats	Patricia Wood	128	6.5	–5.4
Turnout		1,955	30.4	–4.0
Registered electors		6,431		
Labour hold				
Labour hold				

=== Harrold ===
Harrold
Party	Candidate	Votes	%	±%
Conservative	Alison Foster*	789	60.6	–7.1
Liberal Democrats	James Thomson	190	14.6	+8.8
Labour	David Bevan	164	12.6	+6.1
Green	Niamh Lynch	160	12.3	–7.7
Majority		599	46.0	
Turnout		1,303	40.9	
Registered electors		3,209		
Conservative hold		Swing	▼8.0	

=== Kempston Central and East ===
Kempston Central and East (2 seats)
Party	Candidate	Votes	%	±%
Labour	Mohammed Nawaz*	907	46.4	–3.1
Labour	Caroline White	875	44.8	–9.1
Liberal Democrats	Jas Parmar	612	31.3	+20.3
Liberal Democrats	Louise Crofts	429	21.9	+14.2
Conservative	Joseph Johnson	276	14.1	–18.6
Conservative	Simran Nahar	224	11.5	–13.0
Green	Mark Brown	170	8.7	N/A
Turnout		1,920	28.5	–2.7
Registered electors		6,737		
Labour hold				
Labour hold				

=== Kempston North ===
Kempston North
Party	Candidate	Votes	%	±%
Labour	Sue Oliver*	665	64.8	+17.5
Conservative	Elizabeth Hedison	233	22.7	–17.5
Green	Laura Fitzgerald	78	7.6	–0.3
Liberal Democrats	Bipinchandra Shah	50	4.9	+0.3
Majority		432	42.1	
Turnout		1,026	32.0	–4.1
Registered electors		3,228		
Labour hold		Swing	▲17.5	

=== Kempston South ===
Kempston South
Party	Candidate	Votes	%	±%
Labour	Carl Meader*	902	82.8	–0.7
Conservative	Barry Ryan	113	10.4	–2.7
Liberal Democrats	Janet Trengrove	44	4.0	+0.6
Green	Sanjay Patel	31	2.8	N/A
Majority		789	72.4	
Turnout		1,090	33.5	–3.9
Registered electors		3,256		
Labour hold		Swing	▲1.0	

=== Kempston West ===
Kempston West
Party	Candidate	Votes	%	±%
Labour	James Valentine*	615	68.6	+16.5
Conservative	Elizabeth Wootton	191	21.3	–19.4
Liberal Democrats	Paramjeet Kaur	60	6.7	–0.5
Green	James Long	26	2.9	N/A
Communist	Markus Keaney	5	0.6	N/A
Majority		424	47.3	
Turnout		897	28.9	–2.9
Registered electors		3,119		
Labour hold		Swing	▲18.0	

=== Kingsbrook ===
Kingsbrook (2 seats)
Party	Candidate	Votes	%	±%
Liberal Democrats	Dean Crofts*	879	39.5	–1.6
Labour	Ralley Rahman	805	36.1	+1.4
Labour	Mashuk Ullah	776	34.8	+5.9
Liberal Democrats	Henna Khanum	701	31.5	–10.1
Conservative	Caroline Fensome	405	18.2	+5.5
Conservative	Sharanjit Sira	309	13.9	N/A
Green	Nick Meek	187	8.4	–1.7
Turnout		2,227	29.9	–0.3
Registered electors		7,448		
Liberal Democrats hold				
Labour gain from Liberal Democrats				

=== Putnoe ===
Putnoe (2 seats)
Party	Candidate	Votes	%	±%
Liberal Democrats	Michael Headley*	1,638	62.1	–1.8
Liberal Democrats	Max Royden*	1,380	52.3	+2.5
Conservative	Katherine Groves	581	22.0	–4.7
Conservative	Martin MacPherson-Lawley	495	18.8	–0.6
Labour	Wendie Harvey	336	12.7	+3.9
Labour	Geoffrey Pearce	275	10.4	+2.4
Green	Jen Feneley	245	9.3	+1.8
Turnout		2,638	40.6	–5.0
Registered electors		6,498		
Liberal Democrats hold				
Liberal Democrats hold				

=== Queens Park ===
Queens Park (3 seats)
Party	Candidate	Votes	%	±%
Labour	Nesreen Akhtar*	1,604	50.4	+1.6
Labour	Mohammed Masud*	1,484	46.6	+4.8
Labour	Mohammed Din	1,433	45.0	N/A
Independent	Mohammad Rafi	1,349	42.4	N/A
Independent	Zaffar Iqbal	1,042	32.7	N/A
Independent	Gulam Monowar	803	25.2	N/A
Independent	Ishtiaq Ahmed	248	7.8	N/A
Liberal Democrats	Sydney Campbell	193	6.1	+2.6
Conservative	Jennifer Wootton	182	5.7	–7.0
Conservative	Peter Davis	163	5.1	–1.3
Green	Kelvin Plomer	146	4.6	–3.9
Conservative	Verity Wootton	146	4.6	–3.9
Liberal Democrats	James Baggaley	133	4.2	+1.1
Liberal Democrats	Rashid Rogers	73	2.3	N/A
Turnout		3,184	48.8	–1.0
Registered electors		6,524		
Labour hold				
Labour hold				
Labour win (new seat)				

=== Renhold and Ravensden ===
Renhold and Ravensden
Party	Candidate	Votes	%
Independent	Nicola Gribble	564	49.6
Conservative	Fiona Cardinale	397	34.9
Labour	Melanie Purves	98	8.6
Liberal Democrats	Conrad Longmore	78	6.9
Majority		167	14.7
Turnout		1,137	37.0
Registered electors		3,081	
Independent win (new seat)			

=== Riseley ===
Riseley
Party	Candidate	Votes	%	±%
Conservative	Martin Towler*	865	62.1	+1.6
Labour	Min Rodruguez	265	19.0	–6.9
Green	Joanne Hill	142	10.2	N/A
Liberal Democrats	Lorna Marchant	121	8.7	–4.9
Majority		600	43.1	
Turnout		1,393	44.0	+6.1
Registered electors		3,212		
Conservative hold		Swing	▲4.3	

=== Riverfield ===
Riverfield
Party	Candidate	Votes	%
Liberal Democrats	Billy Thompson	524	55.4
Conservative	John Robertson	223	23.6
Labour	Neil Mann	143	15.1
Green	Daniel Stachowiak	56	5.9
Majority		300	31.8
Turnout		946	32.3
Registered electors		2,943	
Liberal Democrats win (new seat)			

=== Sharnbrook ===
Sharnbrook
Party	Candidate	Votes	%	±%
Independent	Doug McMurdo*	946	67.0	+2.9
Conservative	Douglas Hansen-Luke	252	17.9	–7.8
Labour	Thomas McEwan	123	8.7	+4.3
Liberal Democrats	Paul Stekelis	90	6.4	+0.6
Majority		694	49.1	
Turnout		1,411	44.6	–5.3
Registered electors		3,185		
Independent hold		Swing	▲5.4	

=== Shortstown ===
Shortstown (2 seats)
Party	Candidate	Votes	%
Liberal Democrats	Leigh Coombs	652	41.7
Conservative	Sarah-Jayne Gallagher*	605	38.7
Liberal Democrats	Stephen Bowering	529	33.8
Conservative	Sam Holland	419	26.8
Labour	Ali Akbor	253	16.2
Labour	Mansoor Nasir	204	13.1
Green	Richard Baker	170	10.9
Turnout		1,563	30.9
Registered electors		5,059	
Liberal Democrats win (new seat)			
Conservative win (new seat)			

=== Wixams and Wilstead ===
Wixams and Wilstead (3 seats)
Party	Candidate	Votes	%
Conservative	Graeme Coombes*	1,307	45.0
Conservative	Marc Frost	1,129	38.9
Conservative	Andrea Spice	969	33.4
Liberal Democrats	Linda Jack	918	31.6
Liberal Democrats	John Symonds	868	29.9
Liberal Democrats	Sachdev Goldi	829	28.5
Labour	Steve Conway	516	17.8
Labour	Terri Conway	511	17.6
Labour	Amir Khan	448	15.4
Independent	Lee Melville	269	9.3
Turnout		2,905	31.4
Registered electors		9,252	
Conservative win (new seat)			
Conservative win (new seat)			
Conservative win (new seat)			

=== Wootton and Kempston Rural ===
Wootton and Kempston Rural (2 seats)
Party	Candidate	Votes	%
Conservative	John Wheeler*	885	43.7
Liberal Democrats	Susan Abood	858	42.4
Liberal Democrats	Peter Stephens	848	41.9
Conservative	Tristan Tyerman	652	32.2
Labour	John Dawson	296	14.6
Labour	Hamayun Shaid	268	13.2
Turnout		2,025	30.6
Registered electors		6,616	
Conservative win (new seat)			
Liberal Democrats win (new seat)			

=== Wyboston ===
Wyboston
Party	Candidate	Votes	%	±%
Conservative	Tom Wootton*	878	76.0	+4.5
Liberal Democrats	Thomas Townsend	156	13.5	–15.0
Labour	Ian Nicholls	121	10.5	N/A
Majority		722	62.5	
Turnout		1,155	40.6	–1.5
Registered electors		2,875		
Conservative hold		Swing	▲9.8	

== Changes 2023–2027 ==
- June 2025: Caroline White, elected as a Labour councillor for the ward of Kempston East and Central, left the party to sit as an independent. In November 2025, White joined the Green Party and became their fourth councillor.

=== Wyboston (29 June 2023) ===
Wyboston by-election: 29 June 2023
Party	Candidate	Votes	%	±%
Conservative	Julie Cox	610	63.1	–12.9
Liberal Democrats	Thomas Townsend	323	33.4	+19.9
Labour	Ian Nicholls	34	3.5	–7.0
Majority		287	29.7	
Turnout		967	33.8	−6.8
Registered electors		2,860		
Conservative hold		Swing	-16.4	

The by-election was held because Tom Wootton, elected as a councillor for Wyboston at the ordinary election, was also elected Mayor of Bedford.

In November 2023, Mohammed Mahboob Din, elected as a Labour councillor, left the party to sit as an independent.

=== Riverfield ===
Riverfield by-election: 2 May 2024
Party	Candidate	Votes	%	±%
Liberal Democrats	Hilde Hendrickx	579	57.3	+1.9
Conservative	Natalie Christian-John	249	24.7	+1.1
Labour	Warwick Mackie	130	12.9	−2.2
Green	Emma Smart	52	5.1	−0.8
Majority		330	32.6	
Turnout		1,010	34.3	+2.0
Registered electors		2,953		
Liberal Democrats hold		Swing	+0.4	

The Riverfield by-election was triggered by the resignation of Liberal Democrat councillor Billy Thompson.

=== Wyboston (4 July 2024) ===
Wyboston by-election: 4 July 2024
Party	Candidate	Votes	%	±%
Conservative	Sharan Sira	1,096	58.1	–5.0
Liberal Democrats	Susan Henchley	515	27.3	−6.1
Green	Richard Baker	277	14.7	N/A
Majority		581	30.8	+1.1
Turnout		1,888	66.9	+33.1
Registered electors		2,870		
Conservative hold		Swing	+0.6	

The by-election was triggered by the previous councillor, Julie Cox, leaving office because of ill health.
