= Mayor of Bedford =

Directly elected mayor

- Incumbent; Tom Wootton since 4 May 2023
- Style: Mr. Mayor
- Appointer: Electorate of Bedford
- Term length: Four years
- Inaugural holder: Frank Branston
- Website: Mayor of Bedford

The Mayor of Bedford is a directly elected local authority mayor responsible for the executive function, and ceremonial duty of Bedford Borough Council in Bedfordshire. The incumbent is Tom Wootton of the Conservative Party, elected in May 2023.

== History ==
The first known reference to a Mayor of Bedford in England was in 1264.

Prior to the Municipal Corporations Act, 1835, the Mayor of Bedford came into office on 29 September. The first Mayor of the reformed Corporation came into office on 1 January 1836, and subsequent Mayors on 9 November. After the Local Government Act, 1948, and the Local Government Act, 1972, the Mayors from 1949 onwards came into office in May. The civic mayor was replaced by a directly elected mayor in 2002.

Since April 2009 the Borough of Bedford is a unitary authority, with the executive having the powers and functions of both a non-metropolitan district and a non-metropolitan county.

In September 2026, the Labour group on Bedford Borough Council proposed a motion to hold a referendum on the abolition of the position; the motion was defeated by 24 votes to 16.

== Referendum ==
Bedford held a referendum on 21 February 2002 on whether to introduce a directly elected mayor after a petition was signed by at least 5% of the electorate. The move was approved with 11,316 voting in favour and 5,537 against on a turnout of 15.5%.

Mayor of Bedford referendum 21 February 2002
Choice	Votes	%
Elected Mayor	11,316	67.15
Cabinet System	5,537	32.85
Total	16,853	100.00
Valid votes	16,843	99.80
Invalid/blank votes	34	0.20
Total votes	16,877	100.00
Registered voters/turnout	108,817	15.51
Source: Bedford Borough Council

== Elections ==
The first mayoral election on 17 October 2002 saw independent Frank Branston elected as mayor.

=== 2002 ===
Bedford Mayoral Election 17 October 2002
Party	Candidate	1st round		2nd round			1st round votesTransfer votes, 2nd round
Party	Candidate	Total	Of round	Transfers	Total	Of round	1st round votesTransfer votes, 2nd round
Better Bedford Party	Frank Branston	9,557	34.5%	2,521	12,078	63.4%	
Liberal Democrats	Christine McHugh	4,711	17.0%	2,253	6,964	36.6%	
Conservative	Charles Rose	4,661	16.8%				
Labour	Apu Bagchi	4,114	14.8%				
Independent	Ian Clifton	1,893	6.8%				
Independent	Arthur Foster	1,826	6.6%				
Green	Mark Powell	735	2.7%				
Independent	Gurminder Dosanjh	218	0.8%				
Better Bedford Party win							

=== 2007 ===
In 2007 Frank Branston was re-elected as mayor.

Bedford Mayoral Election 3 May 2007
Party	Candidate	1st round		2nd round			1st round votesTransfer votes, 2nd round
Party	Candidate	Total	Of round	Transfers	Total	Of round	1st round votesTransfer votes, 2nd round
Better Bedford Party	Frank Branston	15,966	36.7%	3,732	19,698	59.7%	
Conservative	Nicky Attenborough	10,710	24.6%	2,603	13,313	40.3%	
Liberal Democrats	Christine McHugh	10,533	24.2%				
Labour	Randolph Charles	4,758	10.9%				
Green	Justina McLennan	1,538	3.5%				
Better Bedford Party hold							

=== 2009 by-election ===
A by-election took place on 15 October 2009 after the death of the previous incumbent, Frank Branston in August 2009. The by-election was won by the Liberal Democrat, Dave Hodgson.

Bedford Mayoral By-Election 15 October 2009
Party	Candidate	1st round		2nd round			1st round votesTransfer votes, 2nd round
Party	Candidate	Total	Of round	Transfers	Total	Of round	1st round votesTransfer votes, 2nd round
Liberal Democrats	Dave Hodgson	9,428	26.8%	4,127	13,555	54.0%	
Conservative	Parvez Akhtar	9,105	25.9%	2,438	11,543	46.0%	
Independent	Apu Bagchi	7,631	21.7%				
Independent	Tony Hare	4,316	12.3%				
Labour	James Valentine	3,482	9.9%				
Green	Eve Robinson-Morley	1,183	3.4%				
Liberal Democrats gain from Better Bedford Party							

=== 2011 ===
Dave Hodgson was elected to a full term as mayor on 5 May 2011 after being elected to finish the term of Frank Branston in 2009.

Bedford Mayoral Election 5 May 2011
Party	Candidate	1st round		2nd round			1st round votesTransfer votes, 2nd round
Party	Candidate	Total	Of round	Transfers	Total	Of round	1st round votesTransfer votes, 2nd round
Liberal Democrats	Dave Hodgson	19,966	37.7%	4,325	24,291	55.7%	
Conservative	John Guthrie	17,501	33.0%	1,824	19,325	44.3%	
Labour	Michelle Harris	11,197	21.1%				
Independent	Tony Hare	3,133	5.9%				
Green	Greg Paszynski	1,211	2.3%				
Liberal Democrats hold							

=== 2015 ===
The 2015 mayoral election took place on 7 May 2015, the same day as elections of Bedford Borough Councillors, and the UK General Election. Hodgson was re-elected.

Bedford Mayoral Election 7 May 2015
Party	Candidate	1st round		2nd round			1st round votesTransfer votes, 2nd round
Party	Candidate	Total	Of round	Transfers	Total	Of round	1st round votesTransfer votes, 2nd round
Liberal Democrats	Dave Hodgson	25,282	31.4%	10,020	35,302	57.1%	
Conservative	Jas Parmar	19,417	24.1%	7,096	26,513	42.9%	
Labour	Tim Douglas	15,931	19.8%				
Independent	Steve Lowe	12,883	16.0%				
UKIP	Adrian Haynes	7,060	8.8%				
Liberal Democrats hold							

=== 2019 ===
The 2019 mayoral election took place on 2 May 2019, the same day as the 2019 Bedford Borough Council election, as part of the 2019 United Kingdom local elections.

Bedford Mayoral Election 2 May 2019
Party	Candidate	1st round		2nd round			1st round votesTransfer votes, 2nd round
Party	Candidate	Total	Of round	Transfers	Total	Of round	1st round votesTransfer votes, 2nd round
Liberal Democrats	Dave Hodgson	17,596	36.0%	3,820	21,416	54.2%	
Conservative	Giovanni Carafano	15,778	32.3%	2,327	18,105	45.8%	
Labour Co-op	Jenni Jackson	9,677	19.8%				
Green	Adrian Spurrell	3,239	6.6%				
UKIP	Adrian Haynes	2,627	5.4%				
Liberal Democrats hold							

=== 2023 ===
The 2023 mayoral election took place on 4 May 2023, the same day as the 2023 Bedford Borough Council election, as part of the 2023 United Kingdom local elections. The candidates were Saqhib Ali (Labour Party), the incumbent Dave Hodgson (Liberal Democrats), Adrian Spurrell (Green Party), Alberto Thomas (Heritage Party), and Tom Wootton (Conservative Party).

The result was declared on the night of 5 May, with Wootton defeating Hodgson by 145 votes. Unlike previous elections, this election did not provide for transfer votes due to the passing of the Elections Act 2022, which mandated that mayoral elections in England should be conducted using first-past-the-post rather than the supplementary vote system.

Bedford Mayoral Election 4 May 2023
Party	Candidate	Votes	%	±%
Conservative	Tom Wootton	15,747	33.1	▲0.8
Liberal Democrats	Dave Hodgson	15,602	32.8	▼3.2
Labour	Saqhib Ali	11,568	24.3	▲4.5
Green	Adrian Spurrell	3,795	8.0	▲1.4
Heritage	Alberto Thomas	887	1.9	New
Majority		145	0.3	
Turnout		47,599	35	
Conservative gain from Liberal Democrats		Swing		

== See also ==
- List of Mayors of Bedford
