= Frank Branston =

English journalist and mayor

Mayor of Bedford
- In office 21 October 2002 – 14 August 2009
- Preceded by: New Office
- Succeeded by: Dave Hodgson

Personal details
- Born: 9 May 1939 Retford, Nottinghamshire, England
- Died: 14 August 2009 (aged 70)
- Party: Independent
- Website: www.bedford.gov.uk

Frank Branston (9 May 1939 – 14 August 2009) was a journalist, novelist and newspaper proprietor, and the first directly elected mayor of the Borough of Bedford in Bedfordshire, England.

== Early life and career ==
Frank Branston was born in Retford, Nottinghamshire, brought up in Chelsea, west London, and educated at Sloane Grammar School, Chelsea, leaving in 1955 aged 16. He married Marlies, originally from Germany, in 1968, and was the father of two children: Naomi (a lawyer) and Antonia (marketing).

Prior to entering politics he was a journalist, although he was for a while a member of the Labour Party in the 1970s. In 1974 he was the first journalist on a weekly newspaper to be named as the National Press Awards' Provincial Journalist of the Year. After launching his own newspaper, Bedfordshire on Sunday, in 1977, he also received a number of other awards.

Branston was the owner of five local newspapers: Bedfordshire on Sunday, Luton on Sunday, Hertfordshire on Sunday, Leighton Buzzard on Sunday and the Milton Keynes News, with a total distribution approaching 400,000. He and his wife sold their 88% stake in the newspapers in 2005. He was also the author of two novels, "Sergeant Ritchie's Conscience" (1978) and "An Up and Coming Man" (1977).

== Religion ==
Branston described himself as a "non-practising" Jew, and was the town's second Jewish mayor—coincidentally following on from the first Jewish mayor of the town. Talking about a visit to a local school arranged by the Board of Deputies of British Jews, he said:

Bedford Modern gave room for a travelling exhibition at the request of the Board of Deputies of British Jews and asked me to open it. I am sure they were not aware that I am Jewish (non-practising). I pointed out that while Bedford is certainly one of the oldest boroughs in the country, having been chartered in 1166, it had to wait a long time before getting its first Jewish mayor, Cllr Judith Cunningham in 2002. I succeeded her. Isn’t that always the way? You wait 836 years for a Jewish Mayor then two come along at once..

== Political career ==
Frank Branston stood as an independent in the borough's first direct election for mayor in 2002, backed at the time by the Better Bedford Independent Party, which has since announced that it will field no further candidates. His platform was based on encouraging investment in the town and on focussing on getting things done rather than on party politics (the borough and the county both had a history of hung councils and unimplemented development plans over several decades).

Branston was re-elected with an increased majority on Thursday 3 May 2007, after a count which lasted 16 hours due to problems with an experimental electronic counting system.

== Death ==
In July 2009, he suffered an aortic aneurysm and underwent emergency surgery at Papworth Hospital. He died on 14 August 2009.

In December 2009, a new section of the A428 trunk road bypassing the west of Bedford was named The Branston Way in his memory.

Political offices
New creation	Mayor of Bedford; 2002–2009	Succeeded by Dave Hodgson
