= Dave Hodgson =

Liberal Democrat and former mayor of Bedford

Dave Hodgson MBE
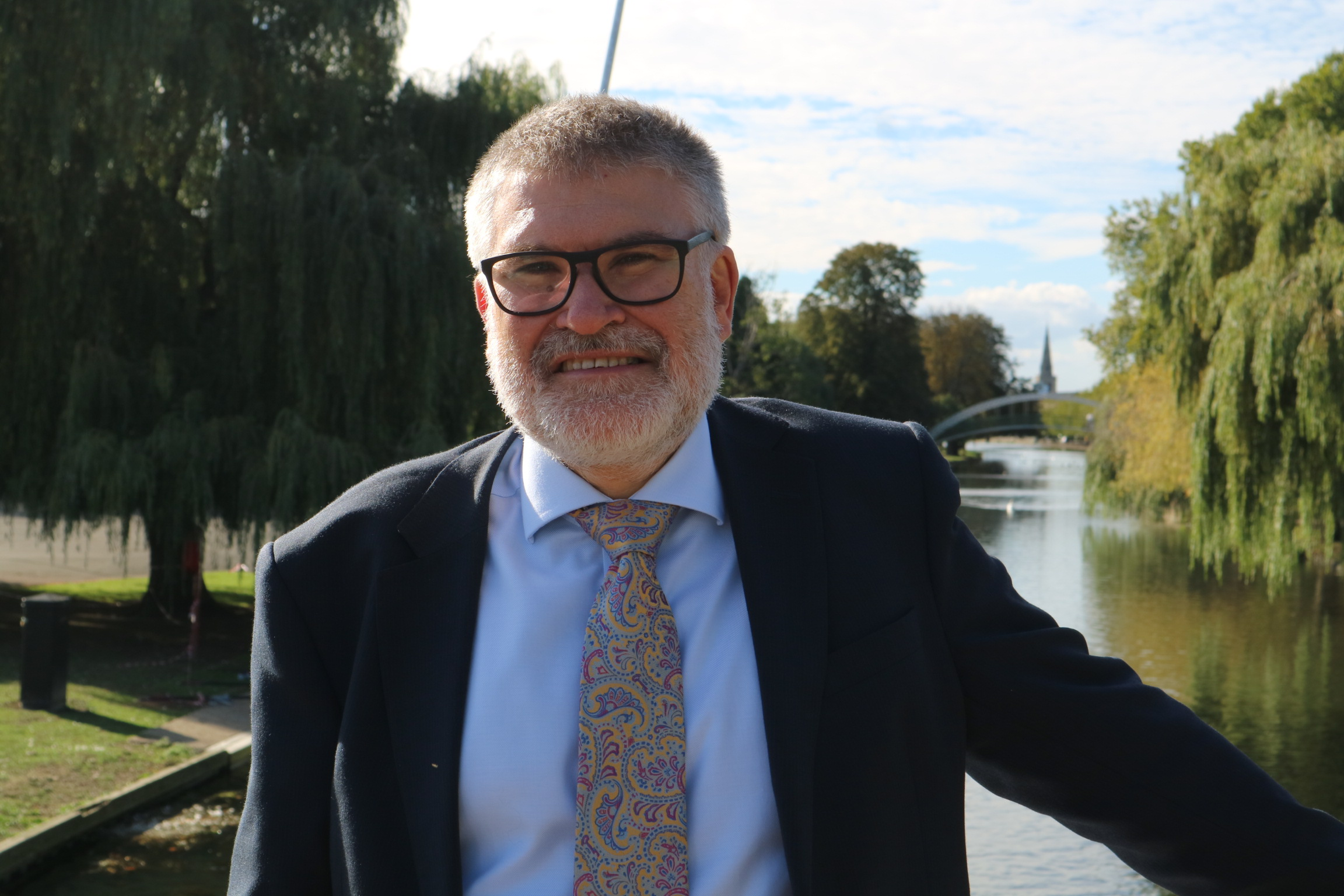

Mayor of Bedford
- In office 19 October 2009 – 5 May 2023
- Preceded by: Frank Branston
- Succeeded by: Tom Wootton

Personal details
- Born: 21 October 1959 (age 66)
- Party: Liberal Democrats
- Website: daveformayor.org.uk

David Stuart Hodgson MBE (born 21 October 1959) is a British Liberal Democrat politician who served as the directly elected mayor of the Borough of Bedford in Bedfordshire, England, from 2009 to 2023. Hodgson was the second elected mayor to represent the Liberal Democrats in the United Kingdom.

Hodgson was elected to office in a by-election held on 15 October 2009, following the death of previous mayor, Frank Branston.

He lost his Mayoralty in the May 2023 local elections.

== Early life and career ==
Hodgson has lived in Bedford since he was nine years old. He attended Mark Rutherford School, where his father was headmaster. Attaining a degree in Computing and Business, Hodgson's career outside politics has included IT, lecturing and operating his own secretarial services business.

== Political career ==
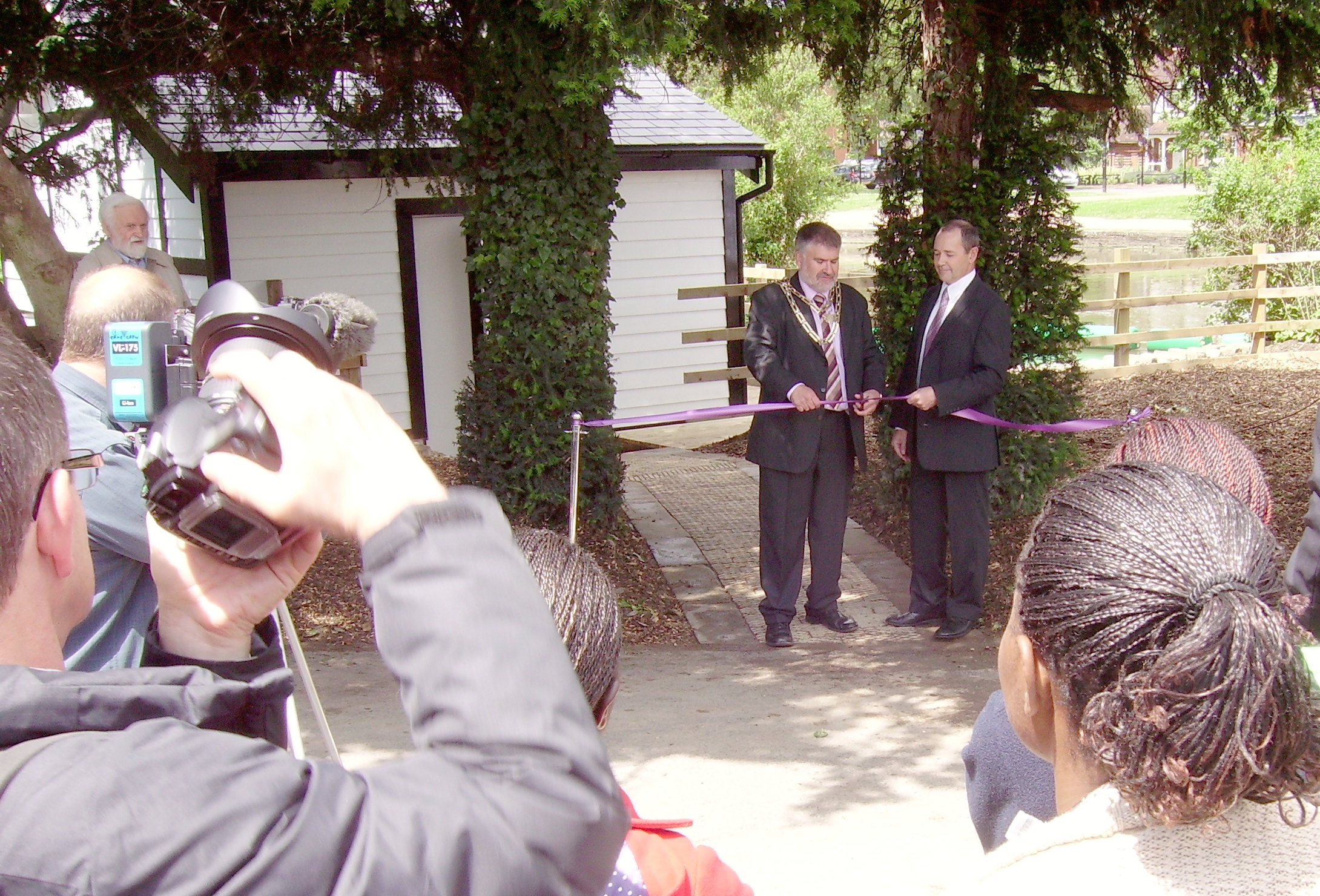
Hodgson opening the Bedford Boat Slide Weir Turbine in June 2012.

Hodgson was elected to Bedford Borough Council in 2002, representing Kingsbrook. After the 2009 local elections, Hodgson became leader of the Liberal Democrat group on the council, and was also appointed an executive member with the Portfolio for Partnerships and IT by the mayor, Frank Branston.

After the death of Branston in August 2009, Hodgson was selected as the Liberal Democrat candidate for the mayoral by-election which was held on October 15, 2009. Hodgson gained 9,428 votes in the first round of the election, to his nearest opponent's 9,105. In the second round he gained a further 4,127 votes, and was declared winner.

In May 2011, he was re-elected mayor for a second term, winning 19,966 in the first round to his opponent's 17,501, and then gained a further 4,325 in the second round to win by a majority of 4,966.

In May 2015, he was elected mayor a third time, with 25,282 first-round votes, with Conservative Jas Parmar polling 19,417. With the low-ranked candidates eliminated and second-preference votes taken into account Hodgson had 35,302 compared to his opponent's 26,513, a majority of 8,789.

Hodgson was appointed Member of the Order of the British Empire (MBE) in the 2016 Birthday Honours for services to local government.

In May 2023, Hodgson lost his re-election bid for the Mayoralty. He received 15,602 votes versus his opponent Tom Wootton's 15,747 votes.

== Personal life ==
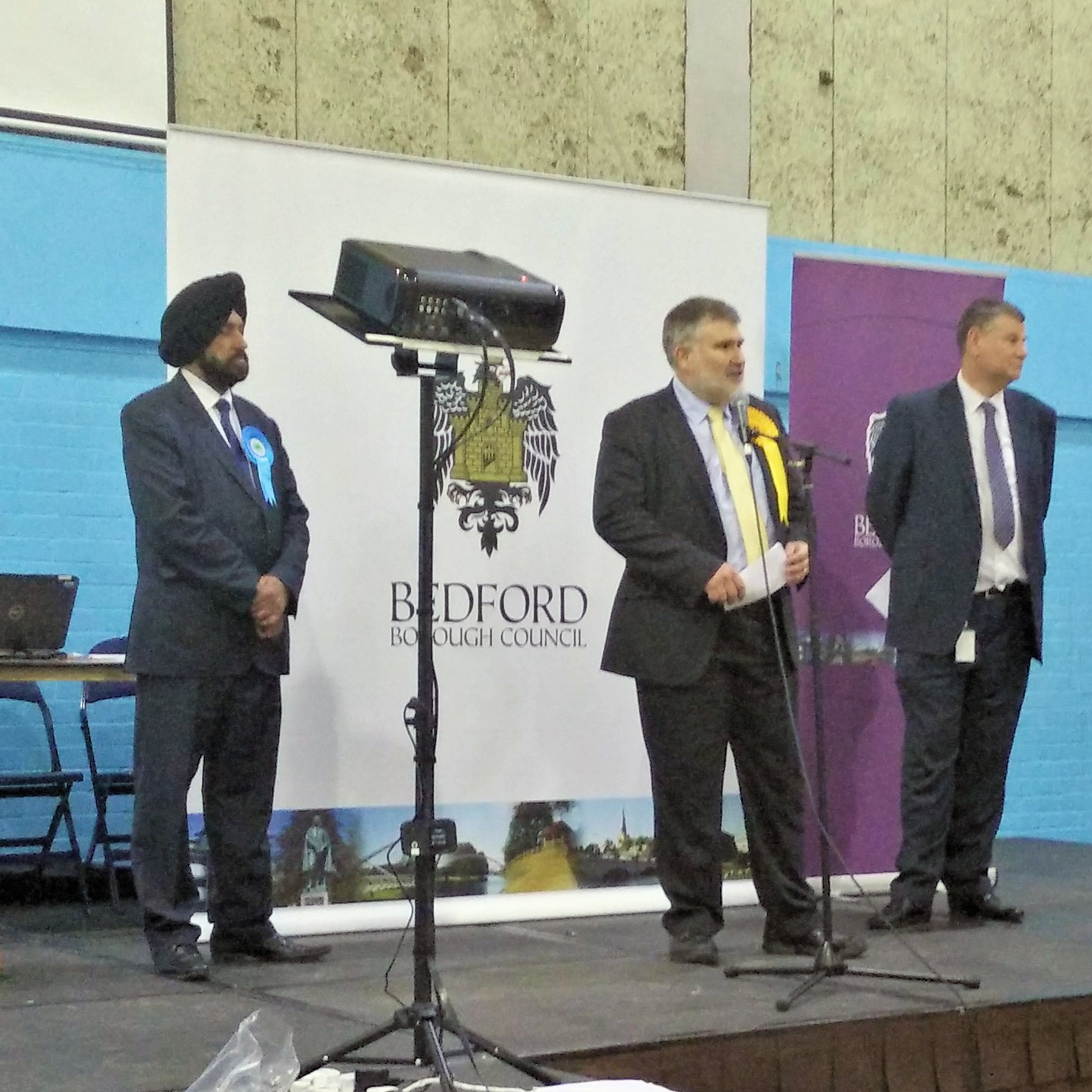
Dave Hodgon's acceptance speech, May 2015.

Hodgson lives in the Kingsbrook area of Bedford with his wife, Christine who previously stood as Mayor of Bedford in both 2002 and 2007. His interests and pursuits include gardening, golf, and watching football with his wife.

Political offices
Preceded by Frank Branston	Mayor of Bedford; 2009 – 2023	Succeeded by Tom Wootton
