= Bedford Borough Council =

Local authority in Bedfordshire, England

Type
- Type: Unitary authority

Leadership
- Speaker: Tim Caswell, Liberal Democrat since 13 May 2026
- Mayor: Tom Wootton, Conservative since 9 May 2023
- Chief Executive: Laura Church since October 2021

Structure
- Seats: 46 councillors plus elected mayor
- Political groups: Administration (14+1) Conservative (14 + mayor) Opposition (32) Liberal Democrats (13) Labour (12) Green (4) Independent (3)
- Length of term: Executive mayor elected every four years Whole council elected every four years

Elections
- Voting system: Plurality-at-large or First-past-the-post (councilllors)
- Voting system: Supplementary vote (Mayor)
- Last election: 4 May 2023
- Next election: 6 May 2027

Meeting place
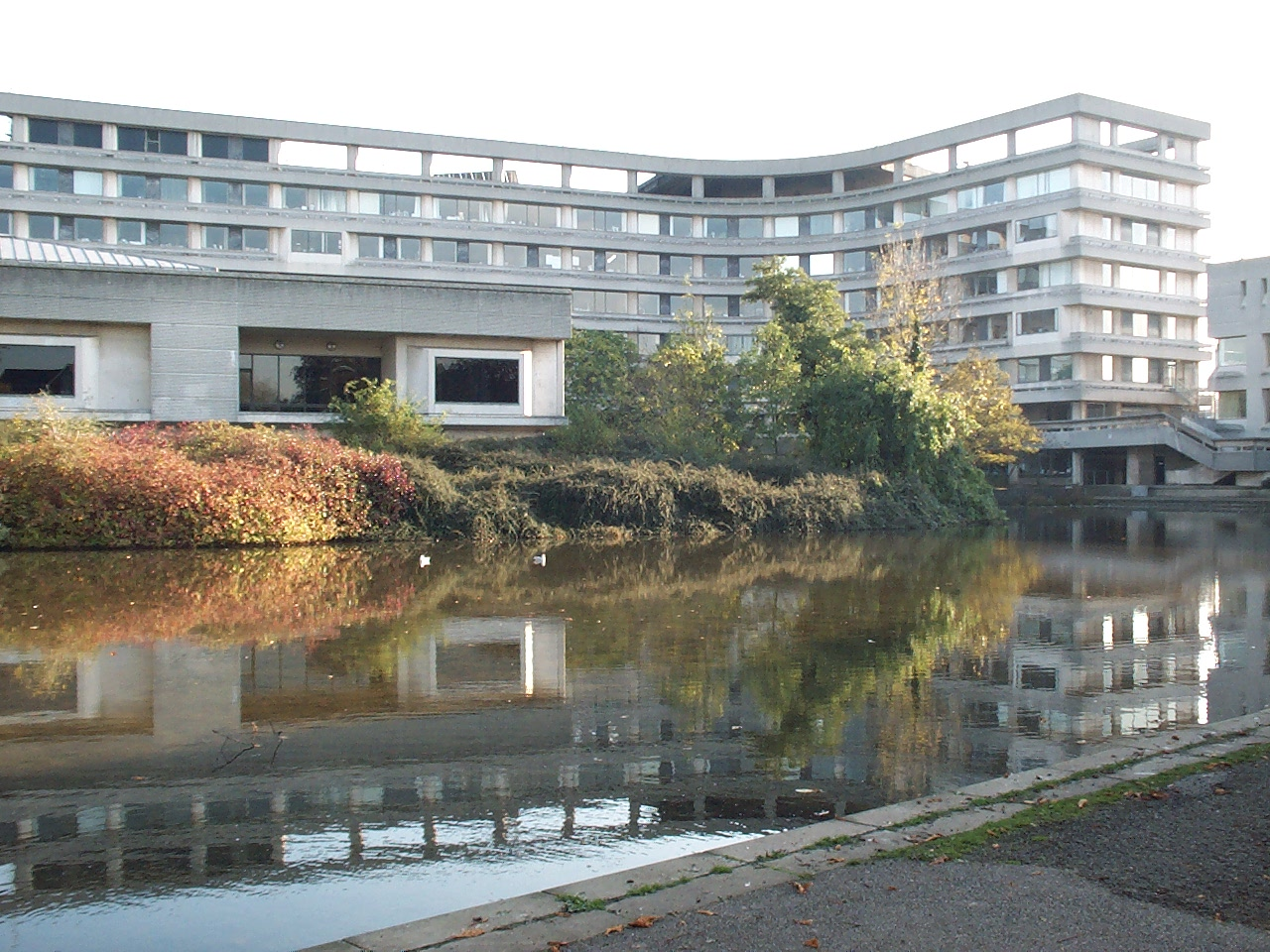
- Borough Hall, Cauldwell Street, Bedford, MK42 9AP

Website
- www.bedford.gov.uk

Bedford Borough Council is the local authority of the Borough of Bedford, a local government district in the ceremonial county of Bedfordshire, England.

The town of Bedford has been a borough since at least the 12th century. Until 1974, the borough's local authority was the borough corporation, which covered only the town and not its rural surroundings. Following nationwide local government restructuring in 1974, a new non-metropolitan district council was created to replace the existing local authorities in Bedford and two neighbouring areas. Initially named Bedford District Council, the council became North Bedfordshire Borough Council in 1975 and adopted its current name in 1992.

From 1889, local government in the area was part of a two-tier system, with county-level services provided by Bedfordshire County Council. Bedfordshire County Council was abolished in 2009, since when Bedford Borough Council has been a unitary authority, being a district council which also performs the functions of a county council.

The council has been under no overall control since 1986. Since 2002 the council has been led by the directly elected Mayor of Bedford. The current mayor, elected in 2023, is Tom Wootton, a Conservative. The council is based at Borough Hall, Bedford.

== History ==
The town of Bedford was an ancient borough, with its first known charter dating from 1166. The ancient borough covered the five parishes of St Cuthbert, St John, St Mary, St Paul and St Peter.

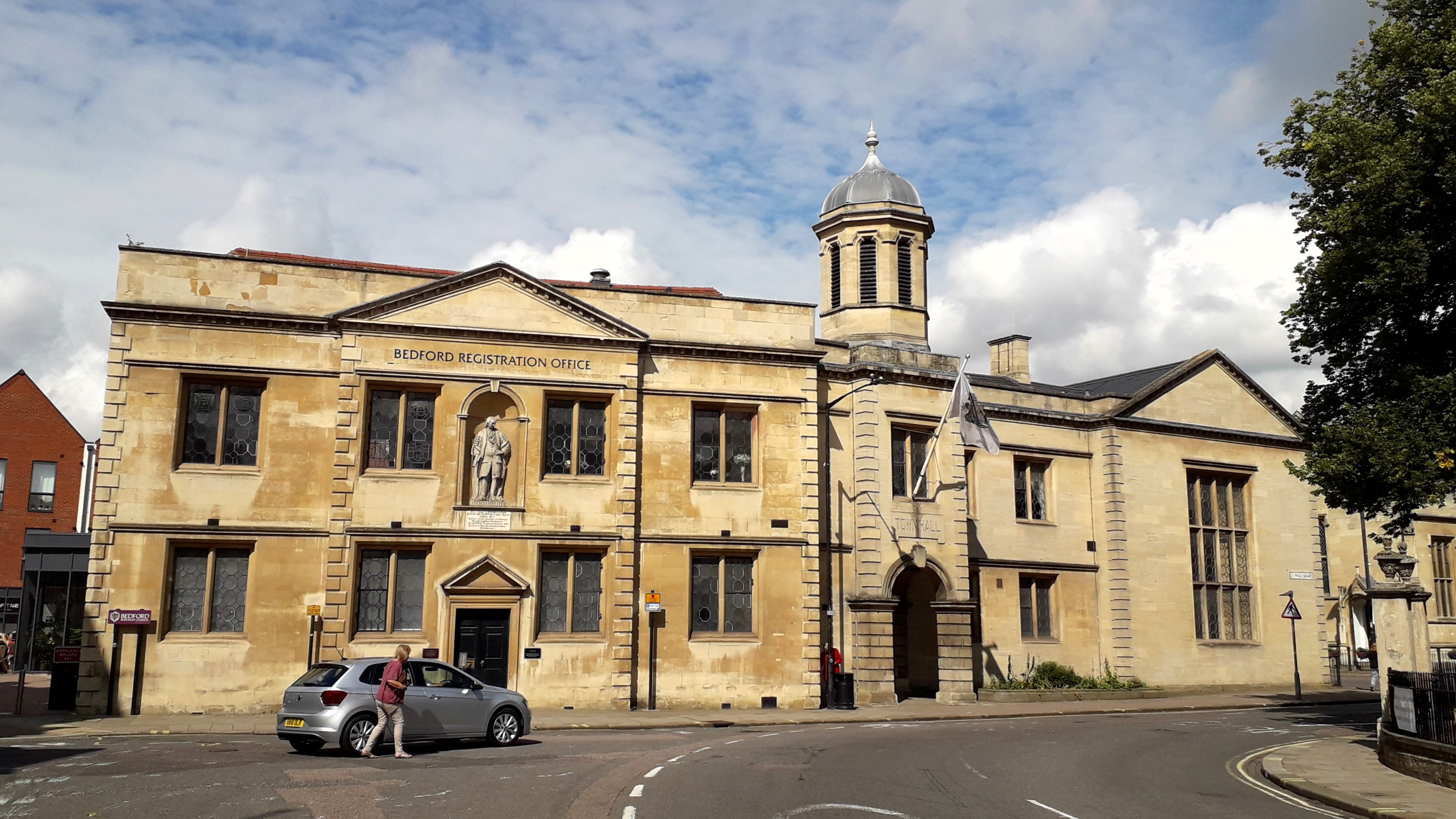
Town Hall, St Paul's Square: Council's headquarters 1892–2009

Bedford was reformed to become a municipal borough in 1836 under the Municipal Corporations Act 1835, which standardised how most boroughs operated across the country. It was then governed by a body formally called the 'mayor, aldermen and burgesses of the borough of Bedford', generally known as the corporation, town council or borough council. The borough boundaries were significantly enlarged in 1934 to take in areas from several neighbouring parishes, notably including most of Goldington parish, including the village. The boundaries were expanded again in 1968.

The modern district and its council were created in 1974 under the Local Government Act 1972, with the first election held in 1973. For its first year it operated as a shadow authority alongside the area's outgoing authorities, being the old Bedford Borough Council, Kempston Urban District Council and Bedford Rural District Council. The new district and its council formally came into being on 1 April 1974.

The new district was initially called Bedford, and it was not given borough status to begin with. To preserve Bedford's ancient mayoralty, the councillors representing wards in the town itself acted as charter trustees. On 16 October 1975 the district was both renamed North Bedfordshire and granted borough status, allowing the chair of the council to take the title of mayor, at which point the charter trustees were abolished. The council changed the district's name back to Bedford with effect from 1 October 1992, becoming Bedford Borough Council.

Following a referendum in 2002, the council chose to have a directly elected mayor as its political leader.

Local government in Bedfordshire was reorganised again with effect from 1 April 2009. Bedfordshire County Council was abolished and Bedford Borough Council became a unitary authority. The change implemented was to create a new non-metropolitan county called Bedford covering the same area as the borough, but with no separate county council; instead the existing borough council took on county council functions, making it a unitary authority. Bedford remains part of the ceremonial county of Bedfordshire for the purposes of lieutenancy.

== Governance ==
As a unitary authority, Bedford Borough Council provides both district-level and county-level functions. Most of the borough is covered by civil parishes, which form an additional tier of local government for their areas. The exception is the central part of the Bedford urban area, roughly corresponding to the pre-1974 borough of Bedford, which is unparished.

The council is a member of the East of England Local Government Association.

=== Political control ===
The council has been under no overall control since 1986.

Political control since the 1974 reforms has been as follows:

Lower tier non-metropolitan district

Party in control	Years
No overall control	1974–1976
Conservative	1976–1986
No overall control	1986–2009

Unitary authority

Party in control	Years
No overall control	2009–present

=== Leadership ===
Bedford Borough Council is one of a relatively small number of councils in England to have a directly elected mayor as its political leader, having chosen to move to directly-elected mayors following a referendum in 2002. The mayors of Bedford since 2002 have been:

Mayor	Party	From	To
Frank Branston	Independent	21 Oct 2002	14 Aug 2009
Dave Hodgson	Liberal Democrats	19 Oct 2009	8 May 2023
Tom Wootton	Conservative	9 May 2023	

=== Composition ===
The council comprises 46 councillors plus the elected mayor. Following the 2023 election and subsequent by-elections and changes of allegiance up to May 2026, the composition of the council (excluding the elected mayor's seat) was:

Party	Seats
Conservative	14
Liberal Democrats	13
Labour	12
Green	4
Independent	3
Total	46

The next election is due to be held in 2027.

== Elections ==
Since the last boundary changes in 2023, the council has comprised 46 councillors, elected from 28 wards. Council and mayoral elections are held together every four years.

== Premises ==
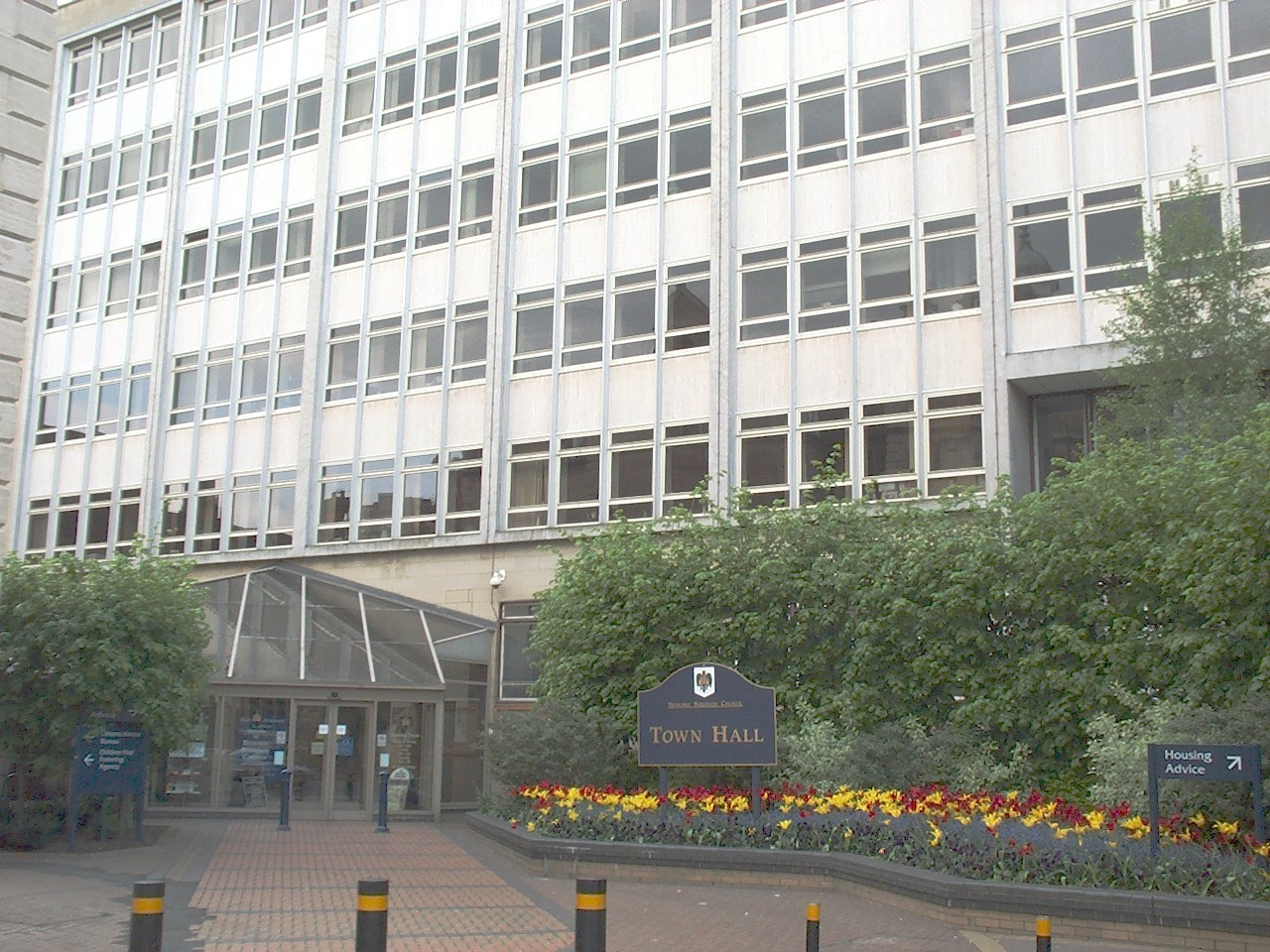
1962 office wing of Bedford Town Hall: Council's main offices 1962–2009, demolished 2014.

From 1892 the old Bedford Borough Council was based at the Town Hall in St Paul's Square, which had previously been part of Bedford School, with parts of the building dating back to c. 1550. A large tower block extension was added to the building in 1962. The Town Hall passed to the new council on local government reorganisation in 1974.

Following the abolition of Bedfordshire County Council in 2009, Bedford Borough Council took over the old County Hall on Cauldwell Street, which had been completed in 1969 for the county council, renaming it Borough Hall. The 1962 wing of the Town Hall was subsequently demolished and the older part of the building renovated to become Bedford's register office.

== Arms ==
Bedford has been granted two distinct coats of arms. The first is per pale Argent and Gules a fess Azure, and the second Argent an eagle displayed wings inverted and head turned towards the sinister Sable ducally crowned and surmounted by a castle of three tiers Or.
