= Tom Wootton =

Politician

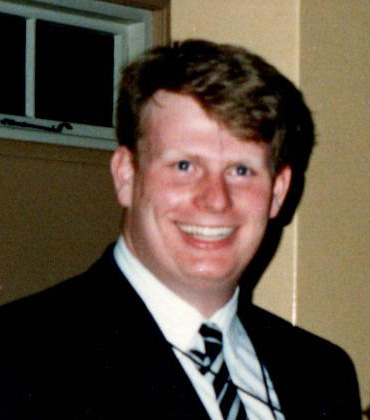
- February 1991
- Preceded by: Dave Hodgson

Mayor of Bedford
- Incumbent
- Assumed office May 2023

Personal details
- Party: Conservative

Tom Wootton is a British Conservative Party local politician. He became the directly elected Mayor of Bedford in May 2023 local elections and was previously the Bedford Borough Councillor for Wyboston Ward.

Wootton defeated incumbent Dave Hodgson, a Liberal Democrat who had held the office of mayor for 13 years, by just 145 votes under the first-past-the-post system. According to the Sunday Telegraph, Wootton was successful in the election due to his "uncompromising line" on the controversial East West Rail project, which he branded as an "utter disaster from start to finish".

A vote of no confidence in Wootton, calling on him to resign as mayor, was passed by a 28-to-12 majority at a Bedford Borough Council meeting in July 2026.

He lives in Ravensden where he manages the family farm, and is married with four children.

Bedford Mayoral Election 4 May 2023
Party	Candidate	Votes	%	±%
Conservative	Tom Wootton	15,747	33.1	▲0.8
Liberal Democrats	Dave Hodgson	15,602	32.8	▼3.2
Labour	Saqhib Ali	11,568	24.3	▲4.5
Green	Adrian Spurrell	3,795	8.0	▲1.4
Heritage	Alberto Thomas	887	1.9	New
Majority		145	0.3	
Turnout		47,599		
Conservative gain from Liberal Democrats		Swing		

Political offices
Preceded by Dave Hodgson	Mayor of Bedford; 2023 – present	Incumbent
