= Bedford Borough Council elections =

Local government elections in Bedfordshire, England

Bedford Borough Council is the local authority for the unitary authority of Bedford in Bedfordshire, England. Until 1 April 2009 it was a non-metropolitan district. Since 2002 it has also had a directly elected mayor.

== Council elections ==
Composition of the council
Year	Conservative	Labour	Liberal Democrats (Note: Includes totals for the predecessors of the Liberal Democrats, the Liberal Party and SDP (both of which participated in the Alliance).)	Green (Note: Includes totals for the predecessors of the Green Party of England and Wales, the Ecology Party and Green Party UK.)	Independents & Others	Council control after election
Local government reorganisation; council established (56 seats)
1973	20	22	2	–	12	No overall control
1976	34	9	6	0	7	Conservative
1979	36	10	7	0	3	Conservative
New ward boundaries (53 seats)
1983	32	9	9	0	3	Conservative
1984	31	11	10	0	1	Conservative
1986	23	14	15	0	1	No overall control
1987	26	12	14	0	1	No overall control
1988	25	13	14	0	1	No overall control
1990	24	15	13	0	1	No overall control
1991	21	16	13	0	3	No overall control
1992	25	15	10	0	3	No overall control
1994	22	16	11	0	4	No overall control
1995	16	20	12	0	5	No overall control
1996	10	22	16	0	5	No overall control
1998	9	22	15	0	7	No overall control
1999	9	19	18	0	7	No overall control
2000	13	18	16	0	6	No overall control
New ward boundaries (54 seats)
2002	25	14	11	0	4	No overall control
2003	18	13	12	0	11	No overall control
2004	16	15	13	0	10	No overall control
2006	17	12	15	0	10	No overall control
2007	19	12	16	0	7	No overall control
Bedford becomes a unitary authority (39 seats)
2009	9	7	13	0	7	No overall control
New ward boundaries (40 seats)
2011	12	12	12	0	4	No overall control
2015	15	14	9	0	2	No overall control
2019	11	11	15	2	1	No overall control
New ward boundaries (46 seats)
2023	13	14	13	3	3 (Note: Including 1 vacant seat.)	No overall control

== Results maps ==
2002 results map

2003 results map

2004 results map

2006 results map

2007 results map

2009 results map

2011 results map

2015 results map

2019 results map

2023 results map

== Mayoral elections ==
Bedford held a referendum on 21 February 2002 on whether to introduce a directly elected mayor after a petition was signed by at least 5% of the electorate. The move was approved with 11,316 voting in favour and 5,357 against on a turnout of 15.5%. The first mayoral election on 17 October 2002 saw independent Frank Branston elected as mayor.

=== 2007 ===
In 2007 Frank Branston was re-elected as mayor.

Bedford Mayoral Election Results 2007
Name	Party	1st Preference Votes	%	2nd Preference Votes¹	%	Final	%²
Frank Branston	Better Bedford Independent	15,966		3,732		19,698	
Nicky Attenborough	Conservative	10,710		2,603		13,313	
Christine McHugh	Lib Dem	10,553				N/A	
Randolph Charles	Labour	4,758				N/A	
Justina McLennan	Green	1,538				N/A	

¹Using the Supplementary Vote system.

²Percentage figures are not officially used on the final votes, they are produced here for illustration and are calculated by the candidates final vote divided by the total of final votes.

=== 2009 ===
A by-election for Mayor of Bedford took place on 15 October 2009 after the death of the previous incumbent, Frank Branston in August 2009. The election was won by the Liberal Democrat, Dave Hodgson.

Bedford Mayoral Election Results 2009
Name	Party	1st Preference Votes	%	2nd Preference Votes	%	Final	%
Dave Hodgson	Liberal Democrat	9,428	26.8	4,127		13,555	54.0
Parvez Akhtar	Conservative	9,105	25.9	2,438		11,543	46.0
Apu Bagchi	Independent	7,631	21.7			N/A	
Tony Hare	Independent	4,316	12.3			N/A	
James Valentine	Labour	3,482	9.9			N/A	
Eve Morley	Green Party	1,183	3.4			N/A	

=== 2011 ===
Bedford Mayoral Election 5 May 2011
Party	Candidate	1st round		2nd round			1st round votesTransfer votes, 2nd round
Party	Candidate	Total	Of round	Transfers	Total	Of round	1st round votesTransfer votes, 2nd round
Liberal Democrats	Dave Hodgson	19,966	37.7%	4,325	24,291	55.7%	
Conservative	John Guthrie	17,501	33.0%	1,824	19,325	44.3%	
Labour	Michelle Harris	11,197	21.1%				
Independent	Tony Hare	3,133	5.9%				
Green	Greg Paszynski	1,211	2.3%				
Liberal Democrats hold							

=== 2015 ===
Bedford Mayoral Election 7 May 2015
Party	Candidate	1st round		2nd round			1st round votesTransfer votes, 2nd round
Party	Candidate	Total	Of round	Transfers	Total	Of round	1st round votesTransfer votes, 2nd round
Liberal Democrats	Dave Hodgson	25,282	31.4%	10,020	35,302	57.1%	
Conservative	Jas Parmar	19,417	24.1%	7,096	26,513	42.9%	
Labour	Tim Douglas	15,931	19.8%				
Independent	Steve Lowe	12,883	16.0%				
UKIP	Adrian Haynes	7,060	8.8%				
Liberal Democrats hold							

=== 2019 ===
Bedford Mayoral Election 2 May 2019
Party	Candidate	1st round		2nd round			1st round votesTransfer votes, 2nd round
Party	Candidate	Total	Of round	Transfers	Total	Of round	1st round votesTransfer votes, 2nd round
Liberal Democrats	Dave Hodgson	17,596	36.0%	3,820	21,416	54.2%	
Conservative	Giovanni Carafano	15,778	32.3%	2,327	18,105	45.8%	
Labour Co-op	Jenni Jackson	9,677	19.8%				
Green	Adrian Spurrell	3,239	6.6%				
UKIP	Adrian Haynes	2,627	5.4%				
Liberal Democrats hold							

=== 2023 ===
Bedford Mayoral Election 4 May 2023
Party	Candidate	Votes	%	±%
Conservative	Tom Wootton	15,747	33.1	▲0.8
Liberal Democrats	Dave Hodgson	15,602	32.8	▼3.2
Labour	Saqib Ali	11,568	24.3	▲4.5
Green	Adrian Spurrell	3,795	8.0	▲1.4
Heritage	Alberto Thomas	887	1.9	New
Majority		145	0.3	
Turnout		47,599		
Conservative gain from Liberal Democrats		Swing		

== By-election results ==
=== 1998-2002 ===
Kingsbrook By-Election 8 April 1999
Party	Candidate	Votes	%	±%
Liberal Democrats	Dan Rogerson	1,043	53.0	+32.0
Labour	Michael Webb	816	41.5	−21.9
Conservative	Janet Suter	108	5.5	−10.1
Majority		227	11.5	
Turnout		1,967		
Liberal Democrats gain from Labour		Swing		

=== 2009-2011 ===
Kingsbrook By-Election 10 December 2009
Party	Candidate	Votes	%	±%
Liberal Democrats	Andrew Gerard	661	49.4	+3.1
Labour	James Saunders	370	27.6	+3.5
Conservative	Adam Pritchard	150	11.2	−9.2
Independent	Tony Hare	85	6.3	+6.3
Independent	Patrick O'Rourke	73	5.5	+5.5
Majority		291	11.8	
Turnout		1,339	18.4	
Liberal Democrats hold		Swing		

Kempston North By-Election 24 June 2010
Party	Candidate	Votes	%	±%
Labour	Shan Hunt	715	52.1	
Conservative	Martin Quince	384	28.0	
Liberal Democrats	Ant Caprioli	272	19.8	
Majority		331	24.1	
Turnout		1,371	33.2	
Labour hold		Swing		

=== 2011-2015 ===
Putnoe By-Election 22 May 2014
Party	Candidate	Votes	%	±%
Liberal Democrats	Rosemary Bootiman	1,364	46.3	
Conservative	Susan Spratt	707	24.0	
UKIP	Adrian Haynes	412	14.0	
Labour	Graham Tranquada	367	12.5	
Green	Ben Fitch	94	3.2	
Majority		657	22.3	
Turnout		2,944		
Registered electors		2,860		
Liberal Democrats hold		Swing		

=== 2023-2027 ===
Wyboston By-Election 29 June 2023
Party	Candidate	Votes	%	±%
Conservative	Julie Cox	610	63.1	–12.9
Liberal Democrats	Thomas Townsend	323	33.4	+19.9
Labour	Ian Nicholls	34	3.5	–7.0
Majority		287	29.7	
Turnout		967		
Conservative hold		Swing		

Riverfield By-Election 2 May 2024
Party	Candidate	Votes	%	±%
Liberal Democrats	Hilde Hendrickx	579	57.3	+1.9
Conservative	Natalie Christian-John	249	24.7	+1.1
Labour	Warwick Mackie	130	12.9	−2.2
Green	Emma Smart	52	5.1	−0.8
Majority		330	32.7	
Turnout		1,010		
Liberal Democrats hold		Swing		

Wyboston By-Election 4 July 2024
Party	Candidate	Votes	%	±%
Conservative	Sharan Sira	1,096	58.1	−5.0
Liberal Democrats	Susan Henchley	515	27.3	−6.1
Green	Richard Baker	277	14.7	+14.7
Majority		581	30.8	
Turnout		1,888		
Conservative hold		Swing		

== European Union Membership Referendum 2016 ==
The electorate of Bedford Borough voted by a margin of 51.8% to 48.2% (on a 72.1% turnout) to leave the European Union during the 2016 United Kingdom European Union membership referendum (reflecting the national picture). The Kingsbrook ward voted most heavily in favour of Leave (60.71%), while the Queen's Park ward voted most strongly for Remain (57.66%). Other areas of Bedford to favour Remain were Bromham and Biddenham, Castle, De Parys, Harpur, Kempston Rural, Newnham, Oakley and Sharnbrook.

District	Votes		Proportion of votes	
District	Remain	Leave	Remain	Leave
Brickhill	2,000	2,092	48.88%	51.12%
Bromham and Biddenham	2,138	1,996	51.72%	48.28%
Castle	1,835	1,366	57.33%	42.67%
Cauldwell	1,322	1,880	41.29%	58.71%
Clapham	1,256	1,731	42.05%	57.95%
De Parys	1,683	1,302	56.38%	43.62%
Eastcotts	1,111	1,322	45.66%	54.34%
Elstow and Stewartby	1,406	1,677	45.60%	54.40%
Goldington	1,575	2,062	43.30%	56.70%
Great Barford	1,987	2,282	46.54%	53.46%
Harpur	1,837	1,398	56.79	43.21%
Harrold	1,295	1,316	49.60%	50.40%
Kempston Central and East	1,664	2,080	44.44%	55.56%
Kempston North	1,153	1,406	45.06%	54.94%
Kempston Rural	2,066	1,889	52.24%	47.76%
Kempston South	1,170	1,624	41.88%	58.12%
Kempston West	1,433	1,747	45.06%	54.94%
Kingsbrook	1,374	2,123	39.29%	60.71%
Newnham	1,962	1,634	54.56%	45.44%
Oakley	1,269	1,158	52.29%	47.71%
Putnoe	1,818	2,028	47.27%	52.73%
Queens Park	1,573	1,155	57.66%	42.34%
Riseley	1,173	1,282	47.78%	52.22%
Sharnbrook	1,425	1,200	54.29%	45.71%
Wilshamstead	1,300	1,661	43.90%	56.10%
Wootton	1,649	1,891	46.58%	53.42%
Wyboston	1,023	1,268	44.65%	55.35%
