= Haynes, Bedfordshire =

Village in Bedfordshire, England

Coordinates: 52.05°N 0.416667°W

Haynes
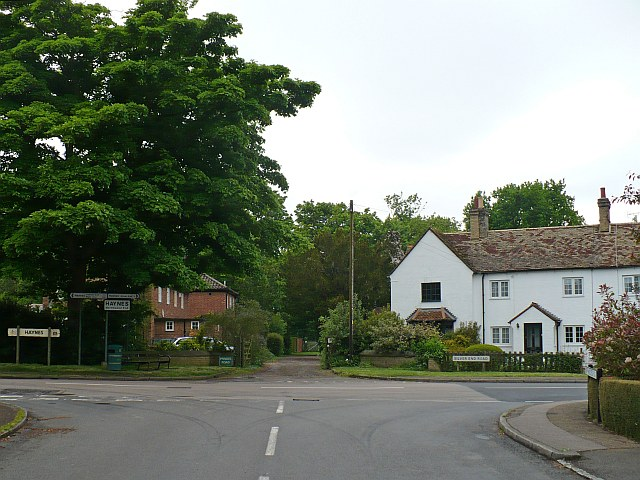

- Location within Bedfordshire
- Population: 1,199 (2011 Census)
- Unitary authority: Central Bedfordshire
- Ceremonial county: Bedfordshire
- Region: East
- Country: England
- Sovereign state: United Kingdom
- Post town: BEDFORD
- Postcode district: MK45
- Dialling code: 01234
- Police: Bedfordshire
- Fire: Bedfordshire
- Ambulance: East of England
- UK Parliament: Mid Bedfordshire

Haynes is a village and civil parish in Bedfordshire, England, about seven miles (11 km) south of Bedford. It includes the small hamlet of Haynes Church End. It used to be known as Hawnes. North from Haynes is a hamlet named Silver End, then further up is Herrings Green, Cotton End and Shortstown. There is a pub, "The Greyhound", a shop, a post office, a village hall and a Lower School.

In 1730 the philosopher John Gay became Vicar of Wilshamstead (later adding the living of Haynes).

== Etymology ==
The name Haynes is first attested in the Domesday Book of 1086, as Hagenes. This derives from an Old English word *hægen or *hagen meaning 'enclosure', in its plural form.

== Manor ==
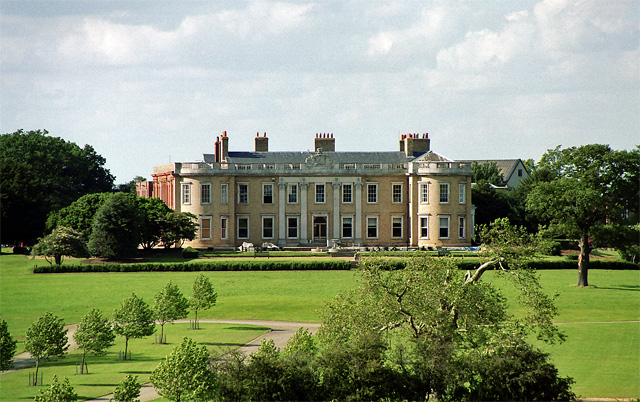
Haynes Park in 2001

Haynes or Hawnes Manor belonged to Sir Robert Newdigate, who died in 1613, and King James was a regular visitor. Anne of Denmark came in July 1605 and was entertained by a Scottish singing woman and Morris dancers. King James came to Haynes on 22 July 1615. The next day he heard that his brother-in-law Christian IV was in London at Denmark House, and he raced back riding through a hail storm.

Haynes manor was acquired in about 1667 by Vice Admiral Sir George Carteret, 1st Baronet (c.1610-1680) of Jersey.

The present mansion of Haynes Park was built c.1725 by his son John Carteret, 2nd Earl Granville.

== Education ==
The majority of this community is in the catchment zone for Robert Bloomfield Academy.

The majority of this community is in the catchment area for Samuel Whitbread Academy, which has upper secondary and sixth form.
