= Eastcotts =

Electoral ward in Bedfordshire, England

Coordinates: 52.097597°N 0.418091°W

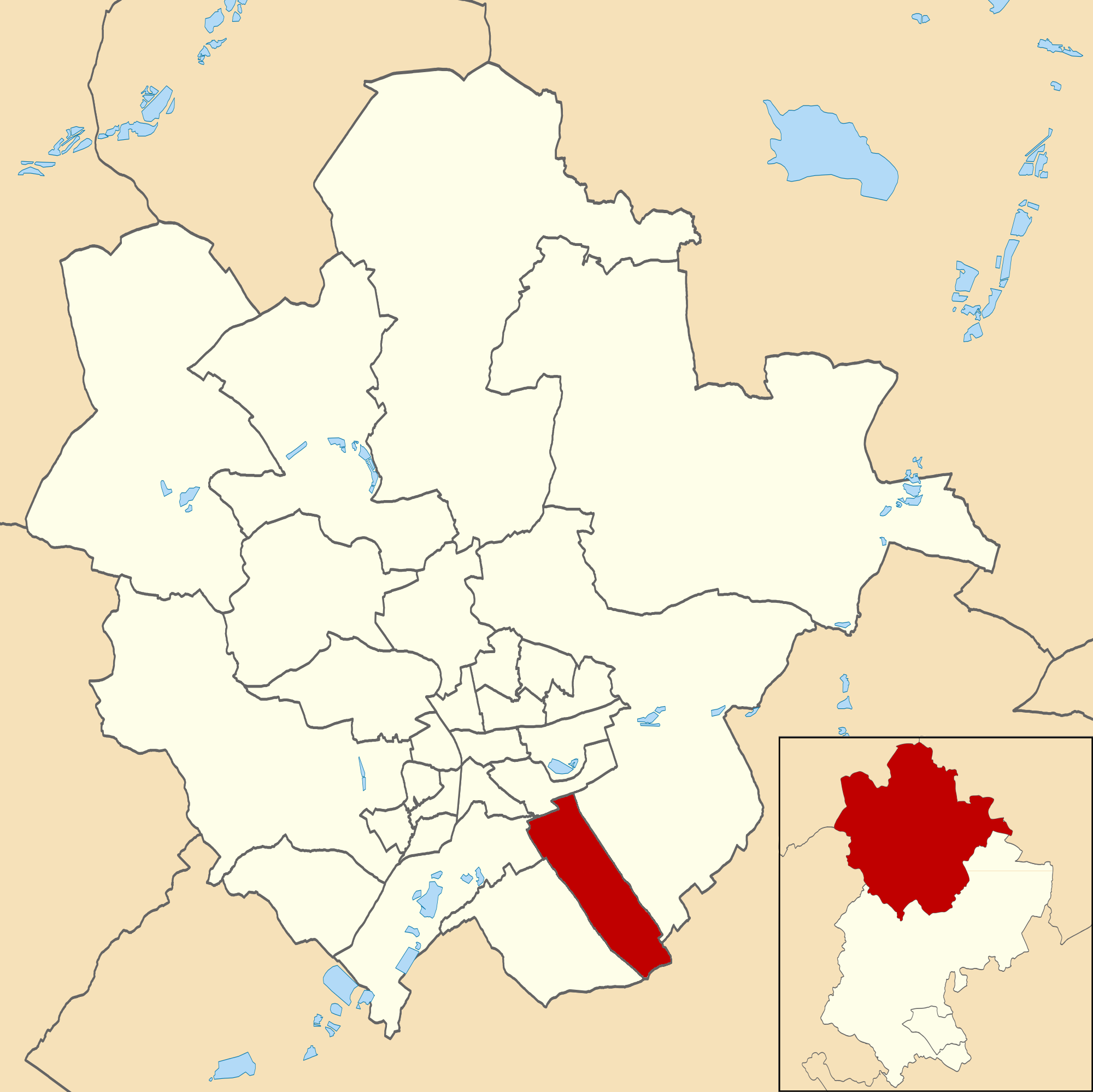
- Eastcotts parish within Bedford

- Location within Bedfordshire
- Population: 4,004 (2016 Census including Harrowden and Shortstown)
- OS grid reference: TL083344
- Unitary authority: Bedford
- Ceremonial county: Bedfordshire
- Region: East
- Country: England
- Sovereign state: United Kingdom
- Post town: BEDFORD
- Postcode district: MK42
- Police: Bedfordshire
- Fire: Bedfordshire
- Ambulance: East of England
- UK Parliament: North Bedfordshire

Eastcotts was an electoral ward within the Borough of Bedford, in the ceremonial county of Bedfordshire, England. It was formerly also a civil parish until its abolition on 1 April 2019, when Cotton End and Shortstown parishes were established.

The boundaries of Eastcotts are approximately Exeter Wood to the east, Bedfordshire Greensand Ridge to the south and Shocott Spring to the west. There are two woodlands; Shocott Spring and Exeter Wood, two villages; Shortstown and Cotton End and two hamlets; Harrowden and Herrings Green. And some landmarks such as the Cardington Sheds.

== History ==
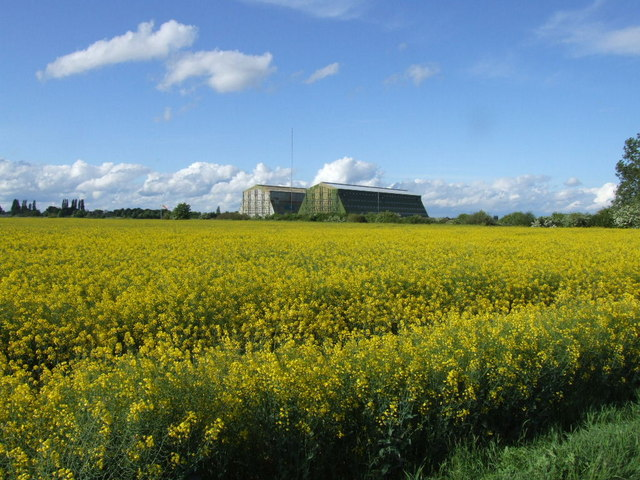
The Cardington Hangars

Eastcotts Castle a small motte castle constructed of timber was built during the 11th or 12th century. Located on the Bedfordshire Greensand Ridge, it overlooked the parish to the north.

In 1831 Eastcotts was described as a chapelry in the parish of Cardington, in the hundred of Wixamtree, 3 1/2 miles south-east of Bedford. It became a separate civil parish in 1866. The township and civil parish initially comprised the hamlets of Cotton End, Fenlake and Harrowden.

In 1915 Short Brothers bought land in the parish to build airships for the Admiralty and constructed a 700-foot-long (210 m) airship hangar to build the two R31 class airships. They also built a housing estate for workers which they named Shortstown. The site was nationalised in 1919 and became known as the Royal Airship Works. The shed was extended in 1926 and its roof was raised to accommodate the R101. A second shed was moved here from RNAS Pulham, Norfolk, in 1928, but after the crash of the R101 in 1930, all work stopped in Britain on airships and the site became a storage station. It became known as RAF Cardington in 1936 and started building barrage balloons and became the No 1 RAF Balloon Training Unit. The site has since been used for a variety of other purposes by a number of organisations including the Royal Aircraft Establishment, the Building Research Establishment, the Meteorological Research Unit, Airship Industries and Hybrid Air Vehicles. The sheds are both listed buildings, but Hangar Number 1 is at risk, needing complete repair and refurbishment.

On 1 April 2019 the parish was abolished and split to Cotton End and Shortstown.

The electoral ward of Eastcotts was abolished in 2021 following an electoral review and replaced by the Shortstown electoral ward. Eastcotts returned one councillor, with Shortstown returning two councillors.

== Population ==
As a result of the building of Shortstown, the population of Eastcotts rose from 848 in 1911 to 2,065 by 1921.

With the ending of National Service in the early 1960's and cuts in the armed forces, the RAF’s presence at Cardington began to dwindle and largely disappeared in the 1970s. As a result, the population of Eastcotts declined from 3,675 in 1951 to 1,710 in 1981.

The majority of the population of the parish, which was 4,004 in 2016, lives in Shortstown in the northern part of the parish, which was built-in in the early 20th century to house workers from the Cardington airship works.

The population of the ward is expected to rise substantially in the near future, as planning permission for the development of 1,100 homes on the new site built in 2011 named New Cardington. 42 hectares (100 acres) site of the former RAF camp in Shortstown was granted in November 2005.

=== Population table ===
Year	Eastcotts	Shortstown	Cotton End
1911	848	-	-
1921	2,065	-	-
1951	3,675	-	-
1981	1,710	-	-
2001	2,431	1,745	686
2011	3,239	2,401	838
2016	4,004	2,392	1,612

== Community facilities ==
Eastcott's open spaces include Shortstown Playing Field near Southcote, Shocott Spring between Cotton End and Shortstown and Exeter Wood which is south-east of the parish.

== Education ==
A boarding school was established as a result of the Elementary Education Act 1870. The school was built in 1874, at a cost of £1,174, for 140 children with a schoolmaster’s house attached.

A primary school was built in Shortstown around 1957, which was then demolished in 2012 to create a new primary school, located in New Cardington, that was completed in September 2013.

There are currently two schools in Eastcotts. One in Shortstown, and another in Cotton End.

== Councillors ==
Election	Councillor
2002	Christine McHugh
2004	Christine McHugh
2009	Sarah-Jayne Gallagher
2011	Sarah-Jayne Gallagher
2015	Sarah-Jayne Gallagher
2019	Sarah-Jayne Gallagher
2021	Sarah-Jayne Gallagher
2023	Ward abolished
