= Eastcotts Castle =

- Eastcotts, Bedfordshire, England
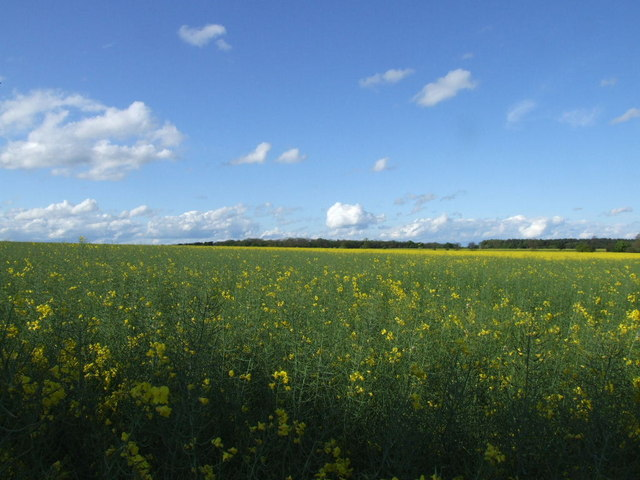
- Exeter Wood near the site of Eastcotts Castle

Site information
- Type: Castle
- Condition: Earthworks

Location
- Shown within Bedfordshire
- Coordinates: 52.0855°N 0.3957°W
- Grid reference: grid reference TL10024423

Eastcotts Castle was a medieval castle located in the parish of Eastcotts, at the edge of Exeter Wood, in the county of Bedfordshire, England.

Eastcotts Castle is believed to have been constructed during the late 11th, or early 12th, centuries. It was a small motte castle, made of timber, located on the northern edge of the Bedfordshire Greensand Ridge. It was in a prime location, overlooking the village of Cardington, as well as the River Ouse.

Only earthworks remain at the site, which is a Scheduled Monument, located in Exeter Wood, 780m south east of Wood Farm.

== See also ==
- Castles in Great Britain and Ireland
- List of castles in England
