= Lord John Thynne =

English aristocrat and Anglican cleric

The Reverend Lord John Thynne
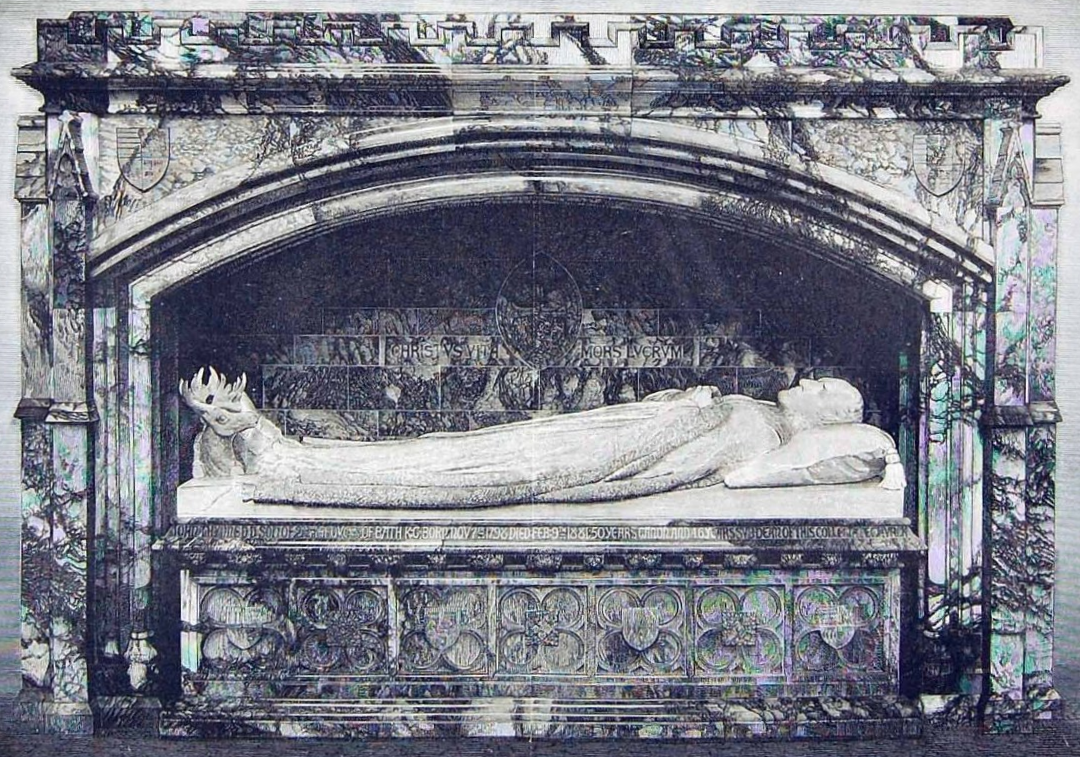
- Monument and effigy of Lord John Thynne in Westminster Abbey
- Born: 7 November 1798
- Died: 9 February 1881
- Education: Eton and St John's College, Cambridge
- Spouse: Anna Constantia Beresford (1806–1866)
- Parent(s): Thomas Thynne, 2nd Marquess of Bath (1765–1837) and Hon. Isabella Elizabeth Byng (1773–1830)
- Church: Church of England
- Ordained: 1822
- Offices held: Curate of Corsley (1822–1823); Rector of Backwell, Street with Walton and Kingston Deverill (1823–1828); Prebendary and subdean of Lincoln (1828–1831)

Arms of Lord John Thynne: Quarterly of 4, 1st and 4th grand quarters: 1&4: Barry of ten or and sable (Botteville); 2nd and 3rd: Argent, a lion rampant tail nowed and erect gules (Thynne); 2: Gules, four fusils in fess argent (Carteret): 3: Gules, three clarions or (Granville). Detail from monument in Kilkhampton Church to his grandson Lt-Col. Algernon Carteret Thynne

The Rev. Lord John Thynne (7 November 1798 – 9 February 1881) was an English aristocrat and Anglican cleric, who served for 45 years as Deputy Dean of Westminster.

== Career ==
Lord John was born in 1798, the third son of Thomas Thynne, 2nd Marquess of Bath (1765–1837) by his wife Hon. Isabella Elizabeth Byng, a daughter of George Byng, 4th Viscount Torrington.

He was educated at Eton College and St John's College, Cambridge, and was ordained by John Fisher, Bishop of Salisbury, in 1822. His first post was as curate of Corsley, a parish on his father's estate of Longleat, Wiltshire. Next he served as rector simultaneously of Backwell, Street with Walton, and Kingston Deverill, all in Somerset and Wiltshire. In 1828 he was appointed a canon and subdean of Lincoln Cathedral, then became a Canon of Westminster Abbey in 1831. He became sub-dean of Westminster in 1835, later declining the deaneries of Westminster, Wells and Windsor. He lived at Ashburnham House near Westminster Abbey and assisted at the coronation of King William IV and Queen Adelaide, and later at the coronation of Queen Victoria in 1838.

== Marriage and family ==
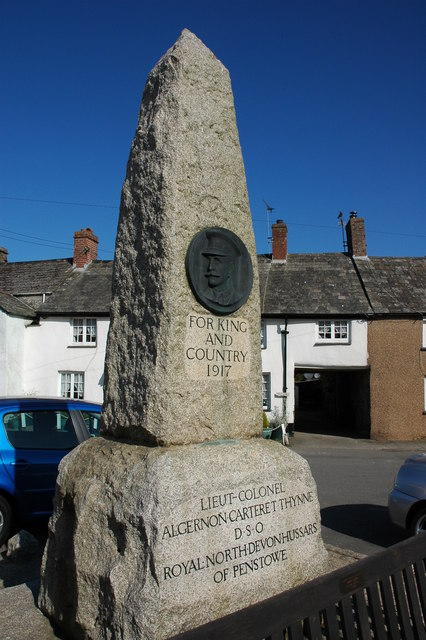
Granite obelisk monument to Lt-Col. Algernon Carteret Thynne (1868–1917), Kilkhampton, Cornwall

On 2 March 1824 at St James's Church, Piccadilly, he married Anna Constantia Beresford, a daughter of the Rev. Charles Cobbe Beresford. She later built the first marine aquarium in Britain. By his wife he had the following issue:

- George Emillus Thynne (1824–1838), eldest son who died aged 14 and predeceased his father.
- Frederick Charles Thynne (1826–1827), died aged 1.
- Francis John Thynne (1830–1910), eldest surviving son and heir, of Haynes Park, Bedfordshire, lord of the manors of Kilkhampton, Stratton and Binhamy, married Edith Marcia Caroline Sheridan daughter of Richard Brinsley Sheridan who had issue including:
  - Lt-Col. Algernon Carteret Thynne (1868–1917), Royal North Devon Hussars, DSO, of Penstowe in the parish of Kilkhampton, Cornwall, killed in action in Palestine during World War I, whose granite obelisk monument survives in the village centre of Kilkhampton with another within the parish church.
  - Capt. George Augustus Carteret Thynne (1869–1945), Royal North Devon Yeomanry, who had descendants surviving in 1968.
- Reverend Arthur Christopher Thynne (1832–1908) married Gwenllian Elizabeth Fanny Isabel Kendall, daughter of Russell Kendall. They had seven sons, and four daughters.
- Captain William Frederick Thynne (1834–1858)
- Lt.-Col. Alfred Walter Thynne (1836–1917)
- John Charles Thynne (1838–1918) married Mary Elizabeth Mac Gregor, daughter of Sir John Murray-Macgregor, 3rd Baronet. They had one son, and three daughters.
- Emily Constantia Thynne (1840–1926) married twice. First to Capt. Eustace Patten, son of John Wilson-Patten, 1st Baron Winmarleigh, on 12 August 1863. Two years after his death she married Thomas Taylour, 3rd Marquess of Headfort. With Patten she one son and a two daughters, and with Lord Headfort one son and a daughter.
- Selina Charlotte Thynne (1842–1913), unmarried
- Maj.-Gen. Sir Reginald Thomas Thynne (1843–1926)

He inherited the estate of Haynes Park, Bedfordshire, and the manor of Kilkhampton in Cornwall from his childless uncle, John Thynne, 3rd Baron Carteret (1772–1849). Stowe House in Kilkhampton had been the seat of his distant ancestor John Granville, 1st Earl of Bath (1628–1701), and had descended from him via the Cartaret family.

== Death and burial ==
He died on 9 February 1881, and was buried at Haynes Park. His monument designed by Henry Hugh Armstead, a recumbent effigy within an arched recess, survives in the north choir aisle of Westminster Abbey.

Religious titles
Preceded by Thomas Manners Hutton	Canon of Westminster; 1831–1881	Succeeded by Alfred Barry
