= Robert Newdigate =

Robert Newdigate or Newdegate (died 1613) was an English courtier and landowner.

== Biography ==
Newdigate was the son of John Newdigate of Harefield, Middlesex, and Anne Conquest (died 1619). He was the younger brother of John Newdigate (died 1610), the husband of Anne Fitton.

Newdigate was a squire of the body to Elizabeth I. He was knighted by James VI and I in May 1603. He was a Member of Parliament for Grampound (1597) and Buckingham (1601).

In July 1605, Anne of Denmark stayed at his house at Hawnes or Haynes near Ampthill. She was entertained by a Scottish singing woman and Morris dancers, and gave them rewards of 40 shillings.

He married Elizabeth Stuteville, a daughter of Thomas Stuteville of Dalham, in 1590. Their children included Robert and Joan.

Newdigate died on 5 September, 1613.
