= Haynes Church End =

Coordinates: 52.06125°N 0.42297°W

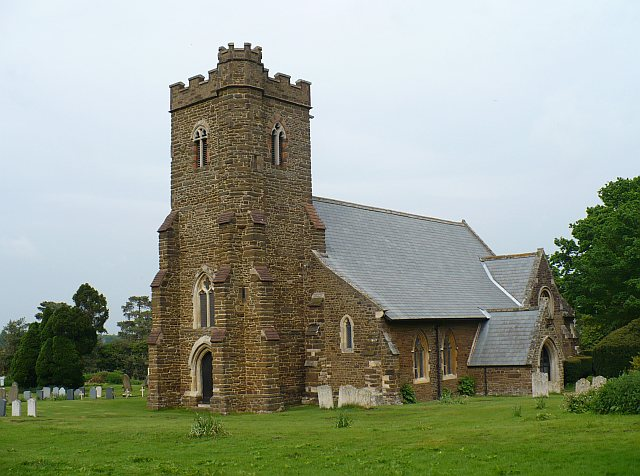
- The parish church of St Mary the Virgin

- Location within Bedfordshire
- OS grid reference: TL082414
- Civil parish: Haynes
- Unitary authority: Central Bedfordshire
- Ceremonial county: Bedfordshire
- Region: East
- Country: England
- Sovereign state: United Kingdom
- Post town: BEDFORD
- Postcode district: MK45
- Dialling code: 01234
- Police: Bedfordshire
- Fire: Bedfordshire
- Ambulance: East of England
- UK Parliament: Mid Bedfordshire

Haynes Church End is located in the Central Bedfordshire district of Bedfordshire, England.

The settlement is close to the larger villages of Houghton Conquest and Haynes. Haynes Church End forms part of the Haynes civil parish and contains the Grade-II*-listed parish church of St Mary the Virgin, as well as Haynes Park.
