= Herrings Green =

Hamlet in Bedfordshire, England

Coordinates: 52.08773°N 0.41697°W

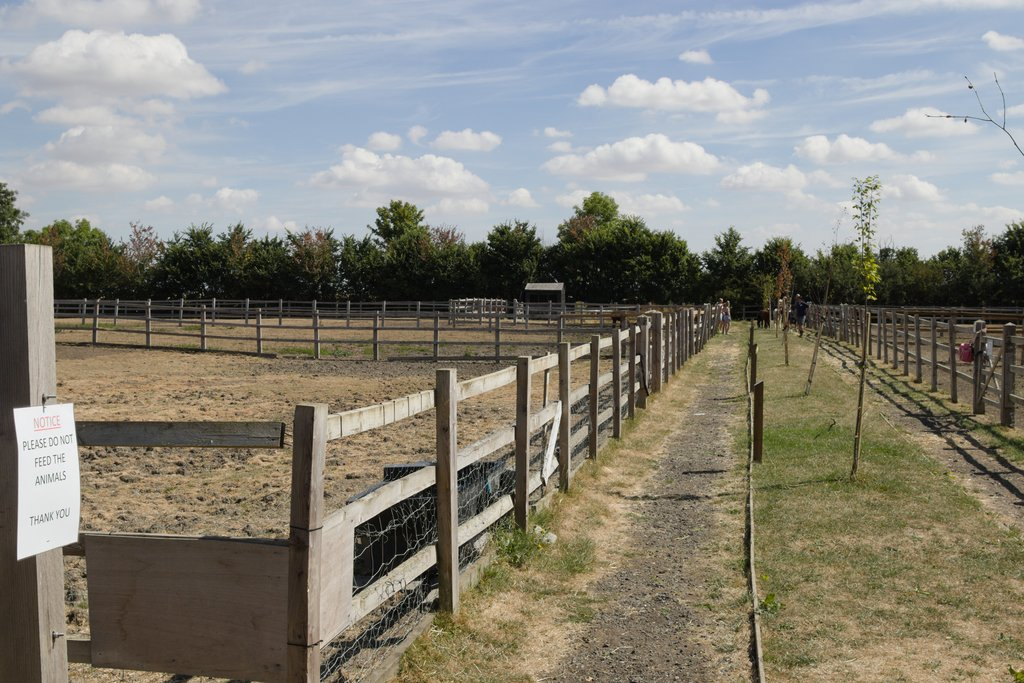
- Enclosures at Herrings Green Farm

- Location within Bedfordshire
- OS grid reference: TL085444
- Civil parish: Cotton End
- Unitary authority: Bedford
- Ceremonial county: Bedfordshire
- Region: East
- Country: England
- Sovereign state: United Kingdom
- Post town: Bedford
- Postcode district: MK45
- Dialling code: 01234
- Police: Bedfordshire
- Fire: Bedfordshire
- Ambulance: East of England
- UK Parliament: North Bedfordshire

Herrings Green is a hamlet in the civil parish of Cotton End, 4 miles (6.4 km) south-east of Bedford in the ceremonial county of Bedfordshire, England. The settlement is close to Cotton End and Wilstead. Until 2019 Herrings Green formed part of Eastcotts civil parish.

Herring's Green Farmhouse on Cotton End Road is Grade II listed. Landowner, Samuel Whitbread (1720–1796) had the farmhouse rebuilt in 1785–6. It has two storeys plus attics under two separate and parallel Dutch gabled roofs, architecturally known as a "double-pile plan". The listing notes this is an "unusual feature" in Bedfordshire.
