= Harrowden, Bedfordshire =

Hamlet in Bedfordshire, England

Coordinates: 52.112605°N 0.441836°W

Harrowden
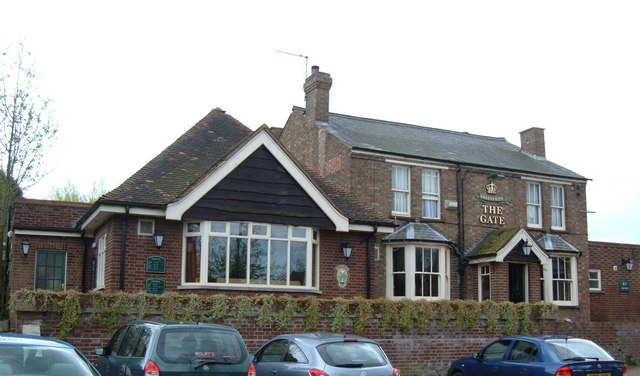
- The Gate public house in 2008 (Now closed and is a house)

- Location within Bedfordshire
- Area: 0.093 km^{2} (0.036 sq mi)
- Population: 32
  - Density: 344/km^{2} (890/sq mi)
- OS grid reference: TL068894
- Civil parish: Eastcotts
- Unitary authority: Bedford
- Ceremonial county: Bedfordshire
- Region: East
- Country: England
- Sovereign state: United Kingdom
- Post town: BEDFORD
- Postcode district: MK42
- Dialling code: 01234
- Police: Bedfordshire
- Fire: Bedfordshire
- Ambulance: East of England
- UK Parliament: North Bedfordshire

Harrowden is a one-street hamlet in the civil parish of Shortstown, Bedfordshire, England. Its name comes from the Old English Hearg-dūn, meaning "Temple Hill".

The street runs from east to west parallel and to the south of the A421 Bedford Southern Bypass, and 200 metres to the north of the village of Shortstown. There is a path at the west side of Harrowden named Bumpy Lane that leads to Abbey Fields. Like Shortstown, Harrowden is in the Eastcotts parish, of the Borough of Bedford.

== History ==
Harrowden is mentioned in the Domesday Survey of 1086, though by the 13th century the area became known as Eastcotes or Cotes. The name derives from the Old English name for a cottage – 'cotum'.

John Bunyan, the Christian writer, was born in Harrowden. (See also Slough of Despond).

Prior to the creation of Shortstown civil parish in 2019, Harrowden was within Eastcotts civil parish. From 2023 Harrowden forms part of the Shortstown ward for elections to Bedford Borough Council.
