= Shortstown =

Village and civil parish in Bedfordshire, England

Coordinates: 52.1106°N 0.4305°W

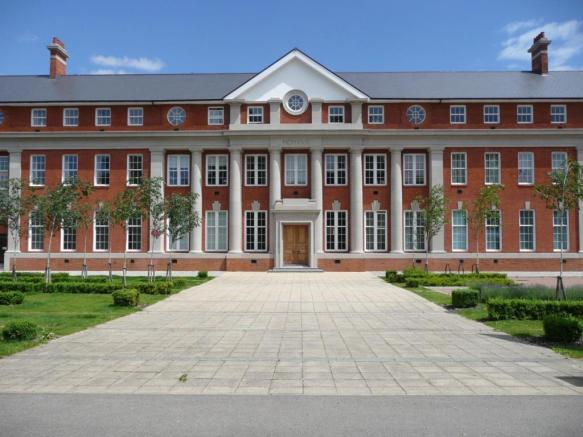
- The Shorts Building

- Location within Bedfordshire
- Area: 0.905 km^{2} (0.349 sq mi)
- Population: 2,392 (2016 Census)
  - Density: 2,643/km^{2} (6,850/sq mi)
- OS grid reference: TL072594
- Civil parish: Shortstown
- District: Bedford
- Unitary authority: Bedford Borough Council
- Ceremonial county: Bedfordshire
- Region: East
- Country: England
- Sovereign state: United Kingdom
- Post town: BEDFORD
- Postcode district: MK42
- Dialling code: 01234
- Police: Bedfordshire
- Fire: Bedfordshire
- Ambulance: East of England
- UK Parliament: North Bedfordshire
- Website: Shortstown Parish Council

Shortstown is a village and civil parish on the outskirts of Bedford, on a ridge above the River Great Ouse, originally called Tinkers Hill. The ridge overlooks Harrowden to the north and Cotton End to the south. The village name is taken from Short Brothers. The Admiralty established an airship works for the company in 1916. The company pulled out of airship work just three years later, but the name Shortstown remained.

== Village history ==
Shortstown was built on Tinker's Hill, Harrowden. Before it was built, a windmill stood on the site from 13th to 16th century. From 17th to 18th century, the area was known as Windmill Hill. Shortstown started with the establishment of the Airship Works in 1917 when housing for the workforce was built next to the airfield. In 1918 and 1927, sheds (later Grade II* listed buildings) were built for the R100 and R101 airships which then represented the latest passenger flight technology. The village was originally built by the Short Brothers for its workers, but evolved into a settlement for people working at the RAF Cardington base.

A map from 1915 of an area where Shortstown now stands.

A map from 1946 of an area where Shortstown now stands.

Shortstown was only created from 1916 onwards. The land originally lay in the township of Eastcotts which was itself a part of the ancient parish of Cardington. Eastcotts became a separate civil parish in 1866.

The site selected for the Short Brothers airship works was broad, level and unobstructed. It had good road and rail links with London and was beyond the range of World War I German bombers based in Belgium.

In October 1916, the site was acquired by the Admiralty from the Whitbread Estate for £110,000. Short Brothers planned to build housing for 600 employees in a new settlement near to the works. By June 1919, one hundred and fifty one homes in a "simplified neo-Georgian style", mostly of red brick with dark red tile roofs had been constructed. Architects were Robert Burns Dick and James Cackett of Newcastle upon Tyne. The houses were arranged in groups of terraces and a social club was built.

Short Brothers vacated the Cardington site on 1 April 1919 and it was taken over by the government and renamed the Royal Airship Works.

=== Shorts Building ===
The Shorts Building was built in 1917. It has taken on many guises, ranging from an Administration Block in the early airship days to Station HQ in WW2 and, in more recent years, as a training centre for the Civil Service. However, despite its many uses, it is still referred to today as The Shorts Building and now, over 90 years later, has been restored to its former glory as part of the new Bellway development.

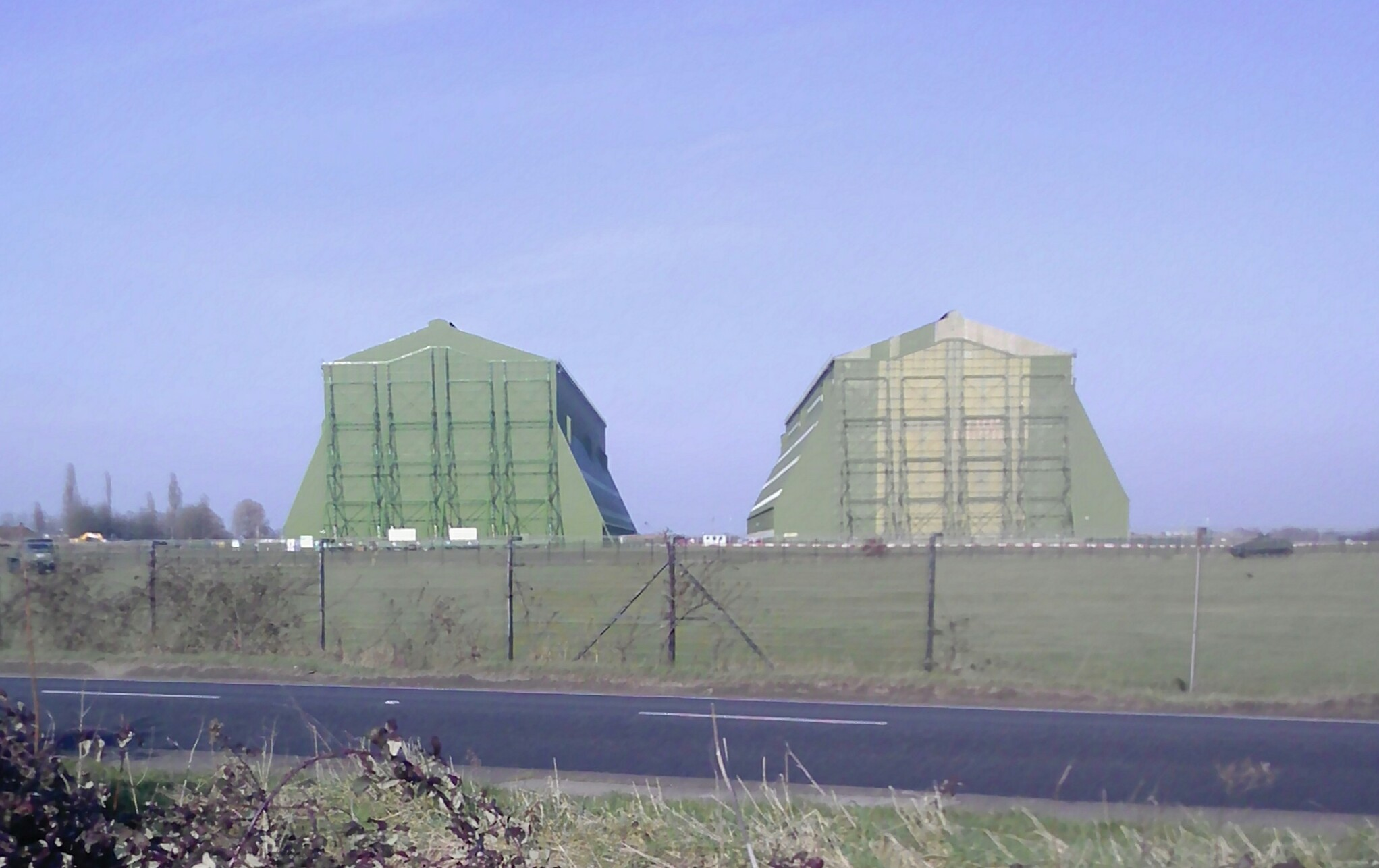
Cardington airship sheds, former Short Brothers works housing R100 and R101 airships. Shed no.1 (left) now holds the new aircraft Airlander 10. Shed no.2 (right) is used for creating films that require a large open-space area

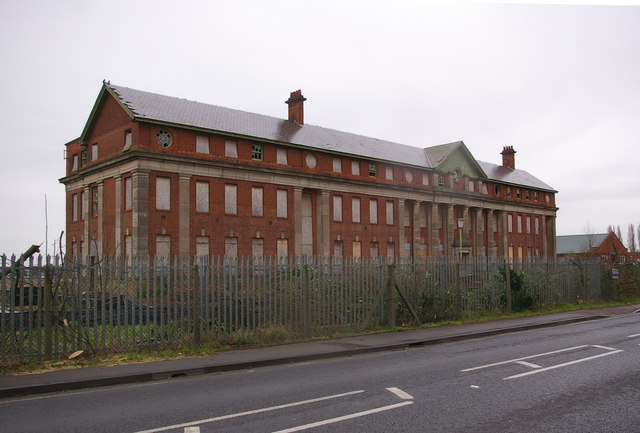
The Shorts Building before it was refurbished in 2011

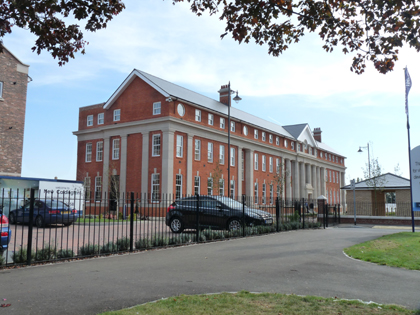
The Shorts Building fully refurbished

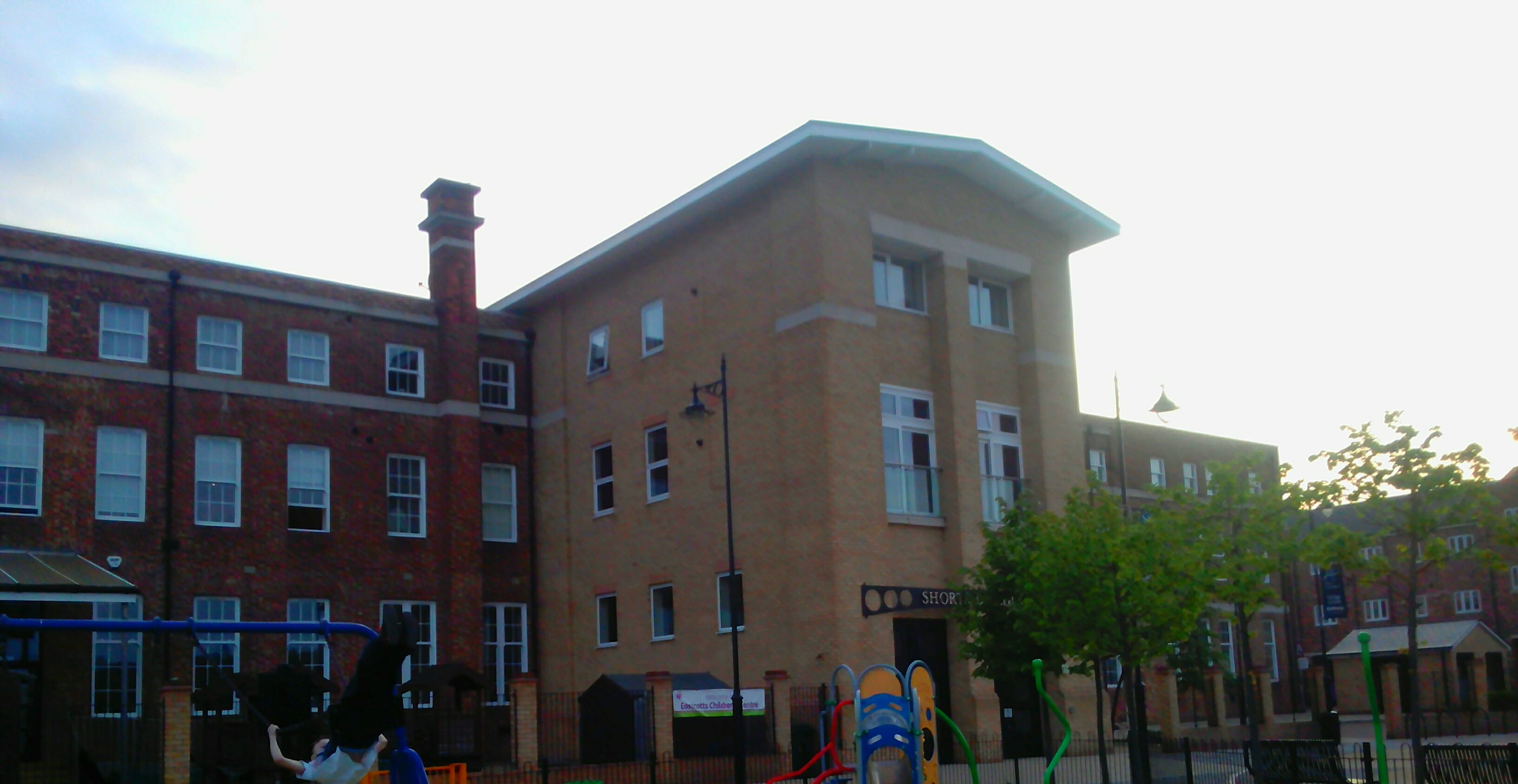
The back of the refurbished Shorts Building

The building was refurbished in 2011, and a new site called New Cardington was also built. It is now used for 20 residential apartments and has a Public Common Hall, that shows a permanent display of 17 enhanced historic R101 photographs taken from The Airship Heritage Trust collection. There are also additional community rooms and Eastcotts Children's Centre is based here too.

=== RAF Cardington ===
The Royal Airship Works was put on a care and maintenance basis until 1938, when it was renamed the Balloon Development Establishment. However, the social club at Shortstown was still known as the Royal Airship Works and Shortstown Club in the 1980s.

In the meantime, in 1936, an RAF station had opened at Cardington, being particularly concerned with producing gas for barrage balloons and training barrage balloon crews as well as more general training of recruits and NCOs. Throughout the 1940s, Cardington remained a busy RAF station, and from 1953, it became the RAF's main recruitment centre.

After the Second World War, further houses were built at Shortstown as married quarters for RAF personnel. The three avenues off the southern extension of Greycote are named after three prominent victims of the R101 disaster: Brigadier-General Lord Thomson, Secretary of State for Air; Air Vice Marshal Sir W. Sefton Brancker, Director of Civil Aviation at the Air Ministry and Major George Herbert Scott, Assistant Director of Airship Development (Flying and Training) at the Royal Airship Works.

The roads of the western half of the site are all named after Second World War bomber aircraft.

With the ending of National service and cuts in the armed forces the RAF's presence at Cardington began to dwindle and largely disappeared in the 1970s. As a result, the population of Eastcotts declined from 3,675 in 1951 to 1,710 in 1981.

== Shortstown today ==
Since 2012, there has been significant housing development on land to the east of the A600, this part of the village is marketed as New Cardington and Eastcotts Green to appeal as more upmarket than Shortstown. Over half of the homes on New Cardington development are for Housing Associations. A new school and shops have been built in the centre of Shortstown. Although Bellway Homes marketed the development as New Cardington, in fact, it remains an extension of Shortstown.

In May 2017, Shortstown celebrated its centenary with Shortstown Fun Day in June, a firework display in September and a Centenary Reunion in November.

In April 2019 Shortstown became a civil parish, having previously been part of the parish of Eastcotts.

== Transport ==
Road access to the village is provided by the A600 road. The Stagecoach bus also runs frequent routes in the village, with Route 9 running to and from the town centre at frequent intervals. Routes 9A and 9B also provide connections to Bedford as well as the nearby locations of Cotton End and Shefford, continuing on to Hitchin.

== Education ==
Shortstown County Primary School was opened in 1957. The first headmaster was Mr Evans; a road in the village was supposedly named after him.

A new school named Shortstown Primary School was built in New Cardington: construction started in late 2012 and completed in September 2013. This school replaced the old, and now demolished school named Shortstown Lower School, where houses now stand.

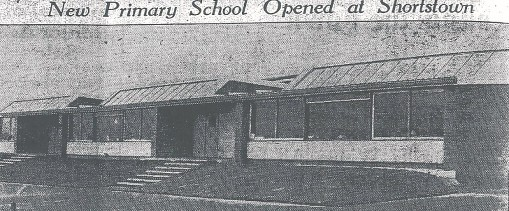
The first school in Shortstown, built in 1957.

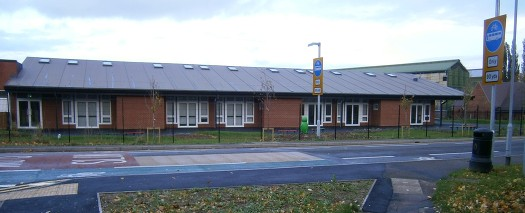
Current Shortstown Primary School

== Notable people ==
- Eustace Short (1875–1932) – Aerospace engineer
- Horace Short (1872–1917) – Aerospace engineer
- Oswald Short (1883–1969) – Aerospace engineer
- Alfred Pugsley (1903–1998) – Structural engineer
- John Fleetwood Baker (1901–1985) – Scientist and Structural engineer
- Neville Shute (1899–1960) – Novelist and Aeronautical engineer
- Walter William Bygraves (1922–2012) – Comedian, Singer and actor
- Bill Wyman (1936–present) – Musician, Songwriter and photographer
- Donald Campbell (1921–1967) – holder of several world land and water speed records in the 1950s and 60s
- Alan Ayckbourn (1939–present) – Playwright and director

== Geology ==
The solid or underlying geology is a mudstone called Oxford Clay Formation. This was laid down between 154 and 164 million years ago in the warm, shallow seas of the Jurassic period. The northern part of the area has a superficial geology consisting of river terrace deposits of sand, gravel, clay and silt. A similar mixture, called head, lies in the southern part of the community. There is a woodland created by the Forest of Marston Vale called Shocott Spring, which is between Shortstown and Cotton End.
