= Anna Thynne =

British zoologist

Anna Thynne, Lady John Thynne
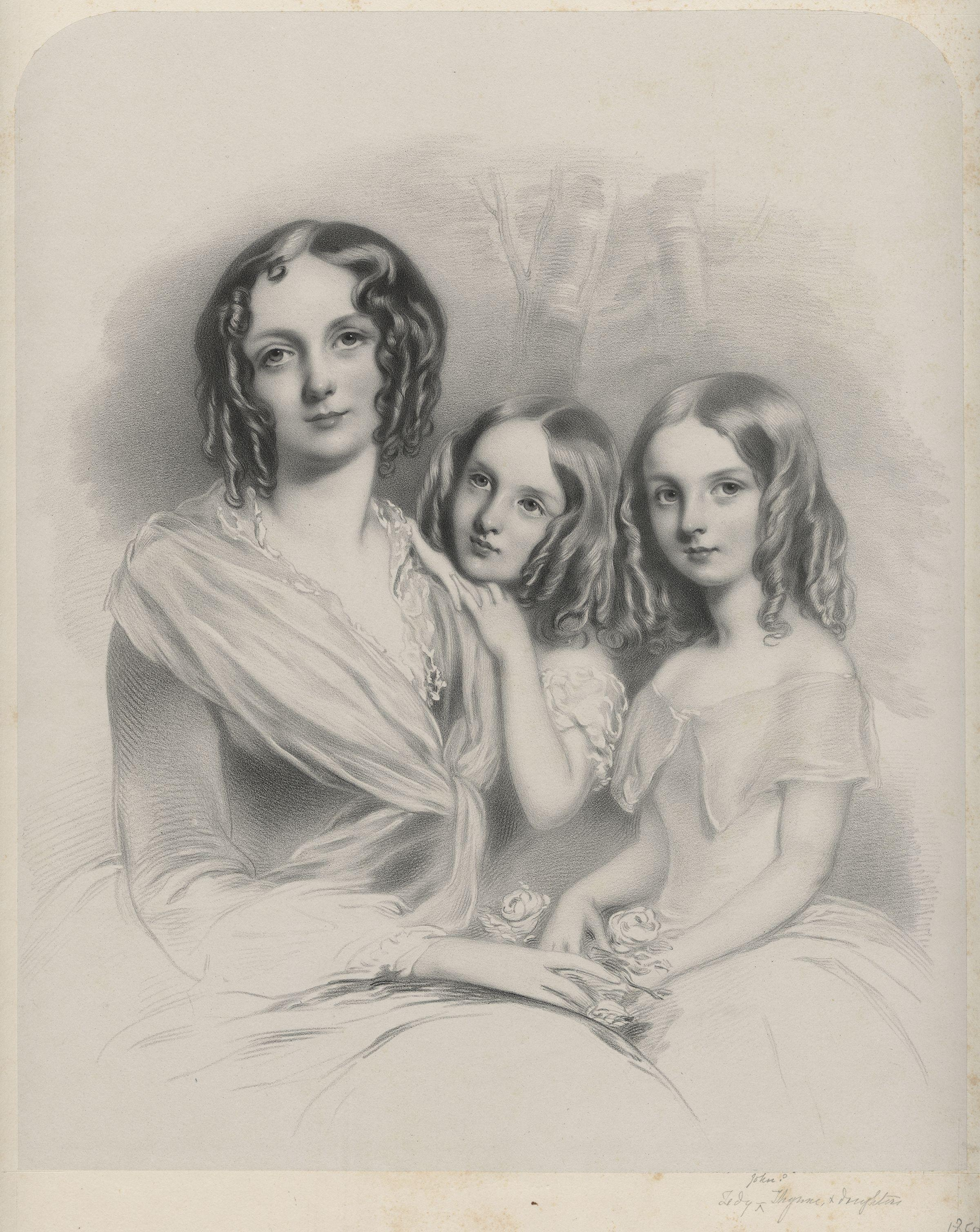
- Anna Thynne with her daughters Selina and Emily
- Born: Anna Constantia Beresford; 1806
- Died: 22 April 1866
- Citizenship: British
- Known for: marine zoology
- Spouse: Lord John Thynne
- Scientific career
- Fields: zoology

Anna Constantia Thynne, known as Lady John Thynne, was born Anna Constantia Beresford (1806–1866) in County Waterford, Ireland. She was the daughter of the Reverend Charles Cobbe Beresford, an Anglican clergyman, and his wife Amelia Montgomery, daughter of Sir William Montgomery, 1st Baronet.

On 24 March 1823 she married Lord John Thynne at St James's Church, Piccadilly, London. Thynne was an Anglican clergyman who later served as a canon and sub-dean of Westminster Abbey. He was also the third son of Thomas Thynne, 2nd Marquess of Bath. The couple had a large family together, with at least ten children.

Thynne's first love was geology, but in 1846 she encountered a madrepore coral and began studying it after realizing that something that appeared to be a rock was actually a living organism.

Wanting to take specimens back to London from Torquay, she began experimenting with ways to keep them alive in seawater. She fixed the corals to a sponge using a needle and thread and placed them in a stone jar. Later she moved them to a glass bowl, changing the seawater every other day.

When she ran out of fresh seawater, she began aerating the water by repeatedly pouring it between containers in front of an open window. This work, often assisted by a household servant, helped keep the animals alive.

In 1847 she added marine plants to the bowls. Within two years she had created a stable marine aquarium that was able to keep marine animals alive in captivity for extended periods.

In 1859 she published the paper "On the Increase of Madrepores" in the Annals and Magazine of Natural History, describing her experiments and explaining how the marine aquarium had been developed.

Her work later influenced the naturalist Philip Henry Gosse, who helped popularize marine aquaria and developed the Fish House at London Zoo in 1853.

== Publication ==
"On the increase of Madrepores". Annals and Magazine of Natural History. 3 (29). London: Taylor and Francis: 449–461. 1859.

== See also ==
- Timeline of women in science
