= 2000 Bedford Borough Council election =

2000 UK local government election

The 2000 Bedford Borough Council election took place on 4 May 2000 to elect members of Bedford Borough Council in England. This was on the same day as other local elections.

== Summary ==
=== Election result ===
2000 Bedford Borough Council election
Party	This election			Full council			This election		
Party	Seats	Net	Seats %	Other	Total	Total %	Votes	Votes %	+/−
Labour	5	▼1	27.8	13	18	34.0	8,509	28.9	–6.9
Liberal Democrats	5	▼2	27.8	11	16	30.2	7,882	26.8	+0.3
Conservative	7	▲4	38.9	6	13	24.5	10,860	36.9	+4.6
Independent	1	▼1	5.6	5	6	11.3	2,194	7.5	+2.0

== Ward results ==
=== Brickhill ===
Brickhill
Party	Candidate	Votes	%	±%
Conservative	Susan Evans	1,133	45.0	+21.0
Liberal Democrats	Cheryl Green*	1,124	44.7	−13.2
Labour	Ivor Amery	259	10.3	–7.8
Majority		9	0.4	
Turnout		2,516	44.1	
Registered electors		5,734		
Conservative gain from Liberal Democrats		Swing		

=== Bromham ===
Bromham
Party	Candidate	Votes	%	±%
Conservative	Terence Rigby	1,350	68.7	+4.4
Independent	William Jago	321	16.3	N/A
Labour	Roger Jackson	189	9.6	–10.3
Liberal Democrats	David Sawyer	105	5.3	–10.6
Majority		1,029	52.4	
Turnout		1,965	35.9	
Registered electors		5,486		
Conservative hold		Swing		

=== Carlton ===
Carlton
Party	Candidate	Votes	%	±%
Independent	Victor Brandon*	731	72.0	–8.5
Conservative	Richard Davison-Francis	198	19.5	N/A
Labour	Terence Carroll	64	6.3	–13.2
Liberal Democrats	Christopher Hall	22	2.2	N/A
Majority		533	52.5	
Turnout		1,015	58.2	
Registered electors		1,747		
Independent hold		Swing		

=== Castle ===
Castle
Party	Candidate	Votes	%	±%
Conservative	Margaret Davey	850	47.7	+11.5
Labour	Catherine Moorhouse*	760	42.6	–12.4
Liberal Democrats	Jacqueline Smithson	173	9.7	+0.9
Majority		90	5.0	
Turnout		1,783	39.0	
Registered electors		4,625		
Conservative gain from Labour		Swing		

=== Cauldwell ===
Cauldwell
Party	Candidate	Votes	%	±%
Labour	Robert Elford*	1,027	72.6	–3.3
Conservative	Edward Davey	269	19.0	+4.5
Liberal Democrats	Anita Gerard	119	8.4	–1.2
Majority		758	53.6	
Turnout		1,415	22.5	
Registered electors		6,314		
Labour hold		Swing		

=== Clapham ===
Clapham
Party	Candidate	Votes	%	±%
Conservative	Mollie Foster	543	54.3	+25.0
Labour	Paul Smith	239	23.9	–3.5
Liberal Democrats	Giorgio Garofalo	218	21.8	N/A
Majority		304	30.4	
Turnout		1,000	36.0	
Registered electors		2,781		
Conservative gain from Independent		Swing		

=== De Parys ===
De Parys
Party	Candidate	Votes	%	±%
Liberal Democrats	John Ryan	1,064	46.8	−5.0
Conservative	Robert Rigby	866	38.1	+7.7
Labour	Charles Baily	229	10.1	–7.7
Independent	Brian Gibbons	113	5.0	N/A
Majority		198	8.7	
Turnout		2,272	39.5	
Registered electors		5,775		
Liberal Democrats hold		Swing		

=== Eastcotts ===
Eastcotts
Party	Candidate	Votes	%	±%
Conservative	Anthony Hare	431	40.1	+6.0
Liberal Democrats	Terence Outen	324	30.2	–16.1
Independent	Peter Harper	209	19.5	N/A
Labour	Caron Rosovske	110	10.2	–9.4
Majority		107	10.0	
Turnout		1,074	36.6	
Registered electors		2,942		
Conservative gain from Liberal Democrats		Swing		

=== Goldington ===
Goldington
Party	Candidate	Votes	%	±%
Liberal Democrats	Patrick Naughton	918	58.2	+10.0
Labour	Laurence Evans	443	28.1	–12.1
Conservative	Peter Hand	215	13.6	+2.0
Majority		475	30.1	
Turnout		1,576	30.0	
Registered electors		5,258		
Liberal Democrats hold		Swing		

=== Harpur ===
Harpur
Party	Candidate	Votes	%	±%
Labour	Julie Sturgess*	688	45.1	–19.7
Conservative	Brian Dillingham	682	44.7	+18.7
Liberal Democrats	Michael Murphy	157	10.3	+1.1
Majority		6	0.4	
Turnout		1,527	25.4	
Registered electors		6,026		
Labour hold		Swing		

=== Kempston East ===
Kempston East
Party	Candidate	Votes	%	±%
Labour	Carl Meader	1,022	52.7	−4.9
Conservative	Michael Williams	651	33.6	+3.1
Liberal Democrats	Timothy Hill	266	13.7	+1.7
Majority		371	19.1	
Turnout		1,939	27.0	
Registered electors		7,316		
Labour hold		Swing		

=== Kempston West ===
Kempston West
Party	Candidate	Votes	%	±%
Labour	William Hunt*	827	47.8	−16.1
Conservative	Philip Catterill	758	43.8	+17.6
Liberal Democrats	Paulette Lodge	146	8.4	−1.5
Majority		638	37.7	
Turnout		1,731	26.5	
Registered electors		6,548		
Labour hold		Swing		

=== Kingsbrook ===
Kingsbrook
Party	Candidate	Votes	%	±%
Liberal Democrats	Dan Rogerson*	742	46.5	+30.2
Labour	Elizabeth Saunders	668	41.9	−27.7
Conservative	Domenico De Benedictis	186	11.7	−2.4
Majority		74	4.6	
Turnout		1,596	32.9	
Registered electors		4,875		
Liberal Democrats gain from Labour		Swing		

The Liberal Democrats had previously gained the Labour seat in a by-election.

=== Newnham ===
Newnham
Party	Candidate	Votes	%	±%
Conservative	John Mingay*	732	41.2	−2.3
Liberal Democrats	William Muir**	617	34.8	+11.3
Labour	Richard Crane	426	24.0	−9.0
Majority		115	6.4	
Turnout		1,775	34.3	
Registered electors		5,180		
Conservative hold		Swing		

William Muir was a sitting councillor for Putnoe ward.

=== Putnoe ===
Putnoe
Party	Candidate	Votes	%	±%
Liberal Democrats	Ralph Hall	1,062	55.8	−1.8
Conservative	Denise Coates	644	33.9	+5.9
Labour	David Lukes	196	10.3	−4.2
Majority		418	21.9	
Turnout		1,902	35.6	
Registered electors		5,361		
Liberal Democrats hold		Swing		

=== Queen's Park ===
Queen's Park
Party	Candidate	Votes	%	±%
Labour	Frank Garrick	1,184	66.7	−3.9
Conservative	Stewart Lister	402	22.6	+1.9
Liberal Democrats	Linda Weerasirie	189	10.6	+1.8
Majority		782	44.1	
Turnout		1,775	27.9	
Registered electors		6,414		
Labour hold		Swing		

=== Roxton ===
Roxton
Party	Candidate	Votes	%	±%
Conservative	William Clarke	615	62.2	–1.6
Independent	Paul Jolley	247	25.0	N/A
Labour	Yvonne Anderson	74	7.5	−13.1
Liberal Democrats	Myrtle Stewardson	53	5.4	−10.1
Majority		989	37.2	
Turnout		766	51.5	
Registered electors		1,934		
Conservative hold		Swing		

=== Wootton ===
Wootton
Party	Candidate	Votes	%	±%
Liberal Democrats	Judith Cunningham*	583	36.6	−3.7
Independent	Dina Smith	573	35.9	N/A
Conservative	Andrew Bishop	335	21.0	–2.3
Labour	Robert Atkins	104	6.5	−18.7
Majority		10	0.7	
Turnout		1,595	40.0	
Registered electors		3,993		
Liberal Democrats hold		Swing		
