= Haynes Park =

Country house in Haynes Church End, England

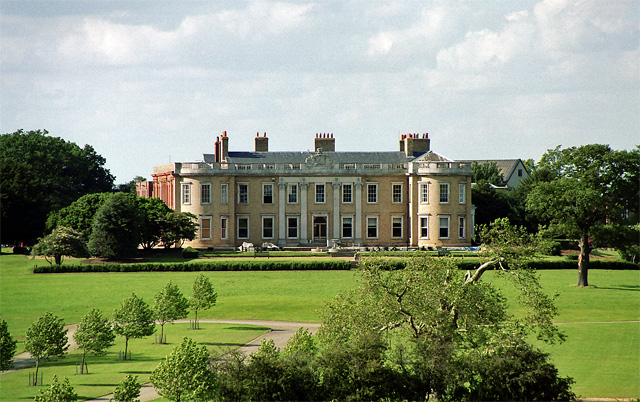
- Interactive map of the Haynes Park area

General information
- Type: Country House
- Architectural style: Georgian
- Location: Haynes Church End, Bedfordshire
- Coordinates: 52.0632°N 0.4261°W
- Completed: c.1725

Technical details
- Material: Brick with slate roof

Design and construction
- Designations: Grade I listed

Haynes Park is a Georgian country house which stands in parkland at Haynes Church End, Bedfordshire, England. It is a Grade I listed building.

Originally known as Hawnes Park it was built c.1725 for John Carteret, 2nd Earl Granville, a prominent statesman and remodelled and expanded several times since by his descendants. It is constructed of red and white brick to a square plan in two storeys with attics and slate roofs. Later extensions formed a courtyard. The south front has 13 bays in a 3-7-3 formation surmounted by a parapet, the two outer bays projecting in 2-storey bows. It stands in an estate which today comprises some 800 acres (320ha) of parkland and woodland.

The estate passed down to John Thynne, 3rd Baron Carteret, who died childless, leaving it to his nephew Lord John Thynne, sub-Dean of Westminster, thence to his eldest son Francis John Thynne, who was lord of the manors of Kilkhampton, Stratton and Binhamy in Cornwall. Stowe House in Kilkhampton, Cornwall, had been the seat of John Granville, 1st Earl of Bath (1628–1701), which manor had descended to his third daughter Lady Grace Granville, suo jure 1st Countess Granville (3 September 1654 – 18 October 1744), wife of George Carteret, 1st Baron Carteret of [Haynes Park, and mother of John Carteret, 2nd Baron Carteret, 2nd Earl Granville. The progeny of this marriage, Barons Carteret, Earls Granville, and Marquesses of Bath (Thynne), were co-heirs to William Granville, 3rd Earl of Bath (1692–1711) who died of smallpox aged 19 without progeny when the earldom became extinct. Haynes Park was the home of Rev. Lord John Thynne (1798–1881), DD, Canon of Westminster, (whose monument with effigy survives in Westminster Abbey), 3rd son of Thomas Thynne, 2nd Marquess of Bath. He inherited it from his childless uncle John Thynne, 3rd Baron Carteret (1772–1849).

Francis Thynne's younger brother was Rev. Arthur Thynne (1833–1908), Rector of Kilkhampton, and a Canon of Truro Cathedral, of the newly built Penstowe House, Kilkhampton. Francis Thynne's second son was Lt Col. Algernon Carteret Thynne (1868–1917), DSO, Royal North Devon Hussars, of Penstowe, Kilkhampton, who was killed in action in Palestine during World War I, and whose monument by Sir William Goscombe John R.A. (1860–1952) survives in Kilkhampton Church. His widow (Anita) Constance Thynne (1871–1961), JP, lived on at Penstowe until her death in 1961. Algernon Thynne's brother and heir was George Thynne of Trelana, Poughill, who sold Penstowe in 1963.

In 1908 Haynes Park was the residence of Mr. W. B. Greenfield (by apparent co-incidence "Greenfield" was the spelling adopted by the Grenville family during the 16th century), formerly tenant of Beechwood Park, Dunstable, and still contained a notable collection of portraits of Grenvilles, Carterets, and Thynnes, including John Grenville, 1st Earl of Bath (1628–1701), Sir Richard VIII Grenville (1542–1591) "of the Revenge", dated 1571, Sir Bernard Grenville (1567–1636), his son, and Sir Bevil Grenville (1596–1643), his great-grandson, killed at the Battle of Lansdowne. A portrait also existed there of Sir George Carteret, 1st Baronet (c.1610–1680), Governor of Jersey, who purchased Haynes in 1667 and whose grandson was the husband of Lady Grace Grenville.

In 1929 the house became a boarding school for girls known as Hawnes Girls School which closed in 1975 and was then taken over by Clarendon School for Girls after their previous premises at Abergele had been destroyed in a fire. After Clarendon School merged with Monkton Combe School near Bath, Somerset in 1992 the property was sold to the Radha Soami Satsang Beas British Isles (RSSB), a registered charity and is still occupied by the associated organisation Science of the Soul.
