= 1983 North Bedfordshire Borough Council election =

1983 UK local government election

The 1983 North Bedfordshire Borough Council election took place on 5 May 1983 to elect members of North Bedfordshire Borough Council in England. This was on the same day as other local elections.

== Summary ==
=== Election result ===
1983 North Bedfordshire Borough Council election
Party	Seats	Gains	Losses	Net gain/loss	Seats %	Votes %	Votes	+/−
Conservative	32			▼4	60.4	42.9	44,195	+1.7
Labour	9			▼1	17.0	29.7	30,606	+0.8
Alliance	9			▲2	17.0	24.4	25,122	–3.9
Independent	3			Steady	5.7	2.9	2,952	+1.3
Communist	0			Steady	0.0	0.1	56	N/A

== Ward results ==
=== Brickhill ===
Brickhill (3)
Party	Candidate	Votes	%	±%
Conservative	E. Constable	1,321	53.5	
Conservative	R. Gwynne Jones	1,218	49.3	
Conservative	A. Semark	1,172	47.5	
Alliance	F. Groves	791	32.0	
Alliance	T. Hill	713	28.9	
Alliance	N. Hill	712	28.8	
Labour	M. Hubbard	357	14.5	
Labour	C. Bainbridge	332	13.4	
Labour	M. Sargeant	324	13.1	
Turnout		2,469	41.7	
Conservative win (new seat)				
Conservative win (new seat)				
Conservative win (new seat)				

=== Bromham ===
Bromham (2)
Party	Candidate	Votes	%	±%
Conservative	V. Cartwright	1,321	66.4	
Conservative	G. Bates	1,172	58.9	
Alliance	A. Barnes	791	39.8	
Alliance	E. Macrae	713	35.8	
Labour	G. Blowers	332	16.7	
Labour	T. Albone	324	16.3	
Turnout		1,989	51.9	
Conservative win (new seat)				
Conservative win (new seat)				

=== Carlton ===
Carlton (1)
Party	Candidate	Votes	%	±%
Independent	V. Brandon	701	61.2	
Conservative	J. Fletcher	444	38.8	
Turnout		1,145	67.0	
Independent win (new seat)				

=== Castle ===
Castle (3)
Party	Candidate	Votes	%	±%
Conservative	M. Dewar	1,095	44.9	
Conservative	R. Rigby	1,053	43.2	
Conservative	M. Simic	1,038	42.5	
Labour	D. Marshall	724	29.7	
Labour	M. Brophy	719	29.5	
Labour	T. Samain	691	28.3	
Alliance	D. Scott	620	25.4	
Alliance	C. Green	572	23.4	
Alliance	Dave Hodgson	524	21.5	
Turnout		2,440	54.9	
Conservative win (new seat)				
Conservative win (new seat)				
Conservative win (new seat)				

=== Cauldwell ===
Cauldwell (3)
Party	Candidate	Votes	%	±%
Labour	W. Astle	1,654	62.4	
Labour	V. Storrow	1,618	61.0	
Labour	R. Elford	1,587	59.8	
Conservative	J. Simmonds	546	20.6	
Alliance	A. Christie	395	14.9	
Alliance	C. Green	343	12.9	
Alliance	M. Sears	318	12.0	
Communist	P. Waite	56	2.1	
Turnout		2,652	47.6	
Labour win (new seat)				
Labour win (new seat)				
Labour win (new seat)				

=== Clapham ===
Clapham (2)
Party	Candidate	Votes	%	±%
Alliance	M. Nice	783	45.4	
Alliance	D. Osborne	596	34.6	
Conservative	W. Martin	476	27.6	
Labour	D. Two	465	27.0	
Conservative	P. Grange	458	26.6	
Labour	M. Fletcher	290	16.8	
Turnout		1,725	57.3	
Alliance win (new seat)				
Alliance win (new seat)				

=== De Parys ===
De Parys (3)
Party	Candidate	Votes	%	±%
Conservative	F. Barley	1,413	55.7	
Conservative	D. Lennox-Lamb	1,411	55.6	
Conservative	A. Watkins	1,404	55.3	
Alliance	J. Struthers	706	27.8	
Alliance	S. Wilson	673	26.5	
Alliance	W. Wright	640	25.2	
Labour	E. Grugeon	420	16.5	
Labour	H. Mitchell	419	16.5	
Labour	Y. Anderson	408	16.1	
Turnout		2,539	46.1	
Conservative win (new seat)				
Conservative win (new seat)				
Conservative win (new seat)				

=== Eastcotts ===
Eastcotts (1)
Party	Candidate	Votes	%	±%
Alliance	J. Chapman	556	49.1	
Conservative	D. Hoyle	477	42.1	
Labour	S. Lowe	99	8.7	
Turnout		1,132	56.7	
Alliance win (new seat)				

=== Felmersham ===
Felmersham (1)
Party	Candidate	Votes	%	±%
Conservative	F. Gibbs	583	64.2	
Alliance	G. Shipp	115	12.7	
Independent	G. Airton	114	12.6	
Labour	J. Yoell	96	10.6	
Turnout		908	52.4	
Conservative win (new seat)				

=== Goldington ===
Goldington (3)
Party	Candidate	Votes	%	±%
Alliance	I. Hedley	1,171	47.4	
Alliance	S. Marsh	1,141	46.2	
Alliance	S. Hickman	1,122	45.4	
Labour	C. Loxley	773	31.3	
Labour	M. Haley	761	30.8	
Labour	J. Loxley	754	30.5	
Conservative	V. Fulford	523	21.2	
Conservative	D. Davis	518	21.0	
Conservative	S. King	496	20.1	
Turnout		2,469	45.0	
Alliance win (new seat)				
Alliance win (new seat)				
Alliance win (new seat)				

=== Great Barford ===
Great Barford (1)
Party	Candidate	Votes	%	±%
Conservative	D. Fordham	637	61.0	
Alliance	J. Abbott	341	32.6	
Labour	M. Holden	67	6.4	
Turnout		1,045	57.5	
Conservative win (new seat)				

=== Harpur ===
Harpur (3)
Party	Candidate	Votes	%	±%
Conservative	B. Dillingham	1,279	60.0	
Conservative	M. O'Driscoll	1,089	51.1	
Conservative	J. Temperley	1,012	47.5	
Labour	D. Heywood	607	28.5	
Labour	J. Shields	596	28.0	
Labour	B. Anderson	589	27.7	
Alliance	M. Waters	242	11.4	
Alliance	E. Evans	227	10.7	
Alliance	S. Blunt	225	10.6	
Turnout		2,130	42.6	
Conservative win (new seat)				
Conservative win (new seat)				
Conservative win (new seat)				

=== Harrold ===
Harrold (1)
Party	Candidate	Votes	%	±%
Conservative	D. Smith	642	53.8	
Alliance	R. Woodside	354	29.7	
Labour	M. Edwards	197	16.5	
Turnout		1,193	56.5	
Conservative win (new seat)				

=== Kempston East ===
Kempston East (3)
Party	Candidate	Votes	%	±%
Conservative	P. Hooley	1,325	47.9	
Conservative	C. Attenborough	1,284	46.4	
Conservative	G. Gilbert	1,240	44.8	
Labour	S. Devereaux	1,101	39.8	
Labour	N. Crowley	964	34.9	
Labour	W. Wilson	947	34.2	
Alliance	J. Brockett	341	12.3	
Alliance	N. Hickman	270	9.8	
Alliance	D. Johnson	225	8.1	
Turnout		2,766	44.8	
Conservative win (new seat)				
Conservative win (new seat)				
Conservative win (new seat)				

=== Kempston Rural ===
Kempston Rural (1)
Party	Candidate	Votes	%	±%
Conservative	B. Wake	787	67.4	
Alliance	J. Jones	199	17.1	
Labour	C. Neff	181	15.5	
Turnout		1,167	58.0	
Conservative win (new seat)				

=== Kempston West ===
Kempston West (3)
Party	Candidate	Votes	%	±%
Conservative	S. Clark	1,003	42.2	
Conservative	R. Hyde	970	40.8	
Conservative	M. Stupple	967	40.7	
Labour	D. Ayris	961	40.4	
Labour	R. Ward	847	35.6	
Labour	F. Garrick	810	34.1	
Alliance	P. Smith	416	17.5	
Alliance	T. Bowers	355	14.9	
Alliance	G. Seagrave	316	13.3	
Turnout		2,378	46.6	
Conservative win (new seat)				
Conservative win (new seat)				
Conservative win (new seat)				

=== Kingsbrook ===
Kingsbrook (3)
Party	Candidate	Votes	%	±%
Labour	T. Mansell	1,055	45.8	
Labour	E. Gledhill	962	41.7	
Labour	I. Luder	934	40.5	
Alliance	M. Nesbitt	776	33.7	
Alliance	P. Parkhouse	589	25.5	
Alliance	C. Davies	577	25.0	
Conservative	K. Haines	475	20.6	
Conservative	M. Haines	449	19.5	
Conservative	M. Williams	393	17.0	
Turnout		2,306	45.5	
Labour win (new seat)				
Labour win (new seat)				
Labour win (new seat)				

=== Newnham ===
Newnham (2)
Party	Candidate	Votes	%	±%
Conservative	R. Hughes	864	41.3	
Alliance	A. Lennon	828	39.5	
Alliance	M. Evans	815	38.9	
Conservative	R. Kendrick	807	38.5	
Labour	R. Crane	402	19.2	
Labour	P. Barton	318	15.2	
Turnout		2,094	55.3	
Conservative win (new seat)				
Alliance win (new seat)				

=== Oakley ===
Oakley (1)
Party	Candidate	Votes	%	±%
Conservative	E. Gough	573	57.2	
Alliance	K. West	295	29.5	
Labour	T. Carroll	133	13.3	
Turnout		1,001	60.0	
Conservative win (new seat)				

=== Putnoe ===
Putnoe (3)
Party	Candidate	Votes	%	±%
Alliance	J. Lennon	1,424	47.9	
Alliance	J. Marsh	1,315	44.2	
Conservative	J. Moore	1,304	43.9	
Alliance	C. Swann-Price	1,298	43.7	
Conservative	B. Purbrick	1,271	42.8	
Conservative	C. Woods	1,238	41.7	
Labour	D. Jones	243	8.2	
Labour	L. Holden	232	7.8	
Labour	R. Vant	204	6.9	
Turnout		2,972	54.8	
Alliance win (new seat)				
Alliance win (new seat)				
Conservative win (new seat)				

=== Queen's Park ===
Queen's Park (3)
Party	Candidate	Votes	%	±%
Labour	J. George	1,464	59.4	
Labour	D. Jones	1,396	56.6	
Labour	M. Cotter	1,329	53.9	
Conservative	P. Mayes	754	30.6	
Conservative	J. Phillips	718	29.1	
Conservative	A. Herring	690	28.0	
Alliance	J. Davis-Cooke	167	6.8	
Alliance	G. Davis-Cooke	164	6.7	
Alliance	K. Culbert	160	6.5	
Independent	A. Awan	80	3.2	
Turnout		2,465	47.9	
Labour win (new seat)				
Labour win (new seat)				
Labour win (new seat)				

=== Renhold ===
Renhold (1)
Party	Candidate	Votes	%	±%
Conservative	H. Bone	695	72.8	
Alliance	A. Tulk	158	16.5	
Labour	J. Caldwell	102	10.7	
Turnout		955	55.7	
Conservative win (new seat)				

=== Riseley ===
Riseley (1)
Party	Candidate	Votes	%	±%
Conservative	S. Cocksedge	858	76.3	
Alliance	R. Holmes	137	12.2	
Labour	J. Thynne	129	11.5	
Turnout		1,124	60.0	
Conservative win (new seat)				

=== Roxton ===
Roxton (1)
Party	Candidate	Votes	%	±%
Independent	P. Merton-Jones	572	73.3	
Alliance	B. Swann-Price	126	16.2	
Labour	M. Bramail	82	10.5	
Turnout		780	44.8	
Independent win (new seat)				

=== Sharnbrook ===
Sharnbrook (1)
Party	Candidate	Votes	%	±%
Conservative	R. Pearson	677	64.5	
Alliance	A. Nicholson	285	27.2	
Labour	S. Hunt	87	8.3	
Turnout		1,049	58.9	
Conservative win (new seat)				

=== Wilshamstead ===
Wilshamstead (1)
Party	Candidate	Votes	%	±%
Conservative	V. Wisson	755	73.7	
Labour	P. Cox	174	17.0	
Alliance	J. Brown	95	9.3	
Turnout		1,024	47.9	
Conservative win (new seat)				

=== Wootton ===
Wootton (2)
Party	Candidate	Votes	%	±%
Independent	D. Perry	965	42.9	
Conservative	M. Bruce	811	36.1	
Independent	P. Quirk	520	23.1	
Labour	D. Lewis	341	15.2	
Labour	A. Quinian	321	14.3	
Alliance	A. Daysh	129	5.7	
Alliance	F. Heraghty	94	4.2	
Turnout		2,247	66.1	
Independent win (new seat)				
Conservative win (new seat)				
