= 2003 Bedford Borough Council election =

2003 UK local government election

Results of the 2003 Bedford Borough Council election

The 2003 Bedford Borough Council election took place on 1 May 2003 to elect members of Bedford Borough Council in England. This was on the same day as other local elections.

Prior to the election, five councillors - four from the Conservatives and one from the Liberal Democrats - left their respective groups and formed the Better Bedford Independent Party.

== Summary ==
=== Election result ===
2003 Bedford Borough Council election
| Party | This election | | | | Full council | | | This election | | |
| Party | Candidates | Seats | Net | Seats % | Other | Total | Total % | Votes | Votes % | +/− |
|---|---|---|---|---|---|---|---|---|---|---|
| Conservative | {{{candidates}}} | 5 | ▼3 | 29.4 | 13 | 18 | 33.3 | 7,902 | 28.7 | –9.1 |
| Labour | {{{candidates}}} | 3 | ▼1 | 17.6 | 10 | 13 | 24.1 | 5,170 | 18.8 | –6.8 |
| Liberal Democrats | {{{candidates}}} | 5 | ▲2 | 29.4 | 7 | 12 | 22.2 | 6,706 | 24.4 | –2.5 |
| Better Bedford Party | {{{candidates}}} | 2 | ▲1 | 11.8 | 4 | 6 | 11.1 | 5,163 | 18.8 | N/A |
| Independent | {{{candidates}}} | 3 | ▲1 | 16.7 | 2 | 5 | 9.3 | 2,154 | 7.8 | –1.7 |
| BNP | {{{candidates}}} | 0 | Steady | 0.0 | 0 | 0 | 0.0 | 223 | 0.8 | N/A |
| Green | {{{candidates}}} | 0 | Steady | 0.0 | 0 | 0 | 0.0 | 186 | 0.7 | +0.4 |

== Ward results ==
=== Brickhill ===
Brickhill
| Party | Candidate | Votes | % | ±% |
|---|---|---|---|---|
| Conservative | Lynne Faulkner* | 1,191 | 45.0 | −1.8 |
| Liberal Democrats | Paul Whitehead | 1,003 | 37.9 | −2.0 |
| Better Bedford Party | Roberto Bosco | 234 | 8.8 | N/A |
| Labour | Karl Sorembik | 178 | 6.7 | −3.6 |
| Green | Jennifer Foley | 40 | 1.5 | N/A |
| Majority | | 188 | 7.1 | |
| Turnout | | 2,646 | 40.3 | |
| Registered electors | | 6,586 | | |
| Conservative hold | | Swing | | |

=== Bromham ===
Bromham
| Party | Candidate | Votes | % | ±% |
|---|---|---|---|---|
| Conservative | Robert Rigby* | 1,181 | 70.2 | −0.6 |
| Liberal Democrats | Stephen Rutherford | 176 | 10.5 | −3.0 |
| Better Bedford Party | Leslie Hunt | 175 | 10.4 | N/A |
| Labour | Arun Muzhi | 151 | 9.0 | −3.3 |
| Majority | | 1,005 | 59.7 | |
| Turnout | | 1,683 | 29.1 | |
| Registered electors | | 5,787 | | |
| Conservative hold | | Swing | | |

=== Carlton ===
Carlton
| Party | Candidate | Votes | % | ±% |
|---|---|---|---|---|
| Independent | Jim Brandon* | 953 | 81.2 | +5.0 |
| Conservative | Anthony Morris | 108 | 9.2 | −4.4 |
| Liberal Democrats | David Robertson | 63 | 5.4 | −4.8 |
| Labour | Stephen Poole | 49 | 4.2 | N/A |
| Majority | | 845 | 72.0 | |
| Turnout | | 1,173 | 50.3 | |
| Registered electors | | 2,342 | | |
| Independent hold | | Swing | | |

=== Castle ===
Castle
| Party | Candidate | Votes | % | ±% |
|---|---|---|---|---|
| Better Bedford Party | Margaret Davey* | 994 | 46.2 | +5.5 |
| Labour | Marilyn Leask | 751 | 34.9 | −2.0 |
| Conservative | Michael Williams | 230 | 10.7 | −30.0 |
| Liberal Democrats | Pierret Lob-Levyt | 177 | 8.2 | −3.0 |
| Majority | | 243 | 11.3 | |
| Turnout | | 2,152 | 35.8 | |
| Registered electors | | 6,052 | | |
| Better Bedford Party gain from Conservative | | Swing | | |

Margaret Davey was the incumbent councillor, originally elected for the Conservatives, but defected to the Better Bedford Party. Because this seat is compared to the last time it was up for election it is shown as a Better Bedford Party gain.

=== Cauldwell ===
Cauldwell
| Party | Candidate | Votes | % | ±% |
|---|---|---|---|---|
| Labour | Christopher Black* | 742 | 50.6 | −7.8 |
| Better Bedford Party | Gurminder Dosanjh | 352 | 24.0 | N/A |
| Liberal Democrats | Neal Bath | 206 | 14.1 | −1.1 |
| Conservative | Denise Coates | 166 | 11.3 | −0.7 |
| Majority | | 390 | 26.6 | |
| Turnout | | 1,466 | 25.7 | |
| Registered electors | | 5,774 | | |
| Labour hold | | Swing | | |

=== Clapham ===
Clapham
| Party | Candidate | Votes | % | ±% |
|---|---|---|---|---|
| Independent | Tom Foster | 633 | 48.1 | N/A |
| Conservative | Judith Arnold* | 310 | 23.6 | −26.6 |
| Independent | John Creasey | 196 | 14.9 | −15.8 |
| Labour | Terence Carroll | 119 | 9.0 | −8.5 |
| Liberal Democrats | Stephen Lawson | 57 | 4.3 | −4.0 |
| Majority | | 323 | 24.6 | |
| Turnout | | 1,315 | 32.0 | |
| Registered electors | | 4,128 | | |
| Independent gain from Conservative | | Swing | | |

=== De Parys ===
De Parys
| Party | Candidate | Votes | % | ±% |
|---|---|---|---|---|
| Liberal Democrats | David Sawyer | 559 | 38.6 | −2.6 |
| Conservative | Tarsem Paul* | 473 | 32.6 | −11.2 |
| Better Bedford Party | Susannah Senior | 242 | 16.7 | N/A |
| Labour | Jane Caldwell | 140 | 9.7 | −0.9 |
| Green | Mark Steinhardt | 35 | 2.4 | N/A |
| Majority | | 86 | 5.9 | |
| Turnout | | 1,449 | 35.1 | |
| Registered electors | | 4,126 | | |
| Liberal Democrats gain from Conservative | | Swing | | |

=== Goldington ===
Goldington
| Party | Candidate | Votes | % | ±% |
|---|---|---|---|---|
| Liberal Democrats | Paul Smith* | 975 | 54.6 | −2.4 |
| Better Bedford Party | Stewart Lister | 350 | 19.6 | N/A |
| Labour | David Lewis | 293 | 16.4 | −5.6 |
| Conservative | Valerie Fulford | 169 | 9.5 | −2.5 |
| Majority | | 625 | 35.0 | |
| Turnout | | 1,787 | 29.0 | |
| Registered electors | | 6,201 | | |
| Liberal Democrats hold | | Swing | | |

=== Great Barford ===
Great Barford
| Party | Candidate | Votes | % | ±% |
|---|---|---|---|---|
| Conservative | Carole Ellis* | 787 | 53.4 | +0.5 |
| Better Bedford Party | Elizabeth Ferguson | 454 | 30.8 | N/A |
| Liberal Democrats | Paul Stekelis | 121 | 8.2 | +0.6 |
| Labour | Pauline Curl | 112 | 7.6 | −8.7 |
| Majority | | 333 | 22.6 | |
| Turnout | | 1,474 | 36.3 | |
| Registered electors | | 4,103 | | |
| Conservative hold | | Swing | | |

=== Harpur ===
Harpur
| Party | Candidate | Votes | % | ±% |
|---|---|---|---|---|
| Labour | Ian Nicholls* | 777 | 46.3 | +6.2 |
| Conservative | Michael Spavins | 439 | 26.1 | −7.9 |
| Better Bedford Party | Stuart Channon | 214 | 12.7 | N/A |
| Liberal Democrats | Rodney Cottrell | 167 | 9.9 | −1.1 |
| Green | Colin Grimley | 82 | 4.9 | −5.6 |
| Majority | | 338 | 20.1 | |
| Turnout | | 1,679 | 27.6 | |
| Registered electors | | 6,128 | | |
| Labour hold | | Swing | | |

=== Kempston South ===
Kempston South
| Party | Candidate | Votes | % | ±% |
|---|---|---|---|---|
| Labour | Carl Meader | 749 | 49.2 | +11.7 |
| Better Bedford Party | David Merry | 481 | 31.6 | −0.8 |
| Conservative | Jagdish Singh | 132 | 8.7 | −5.4 |
| Liberal Democrats | Timothy Hill | 132 | 8.7 | −2.8 |
| Green | Neil Foley | 29 | 1.9 | N/A |
| Majority | | 268 | 17.6 | |
| Turnout | | 1,523 | 27.3 | |
| Registered electors | | 5,590 | | |
| Labour hold | | Swing | | |

=== Kingsbrook ===
Kingsbrook
| Party | Candidate | Votes | % | ±% |
|---|---|---|---|---|
| Liberal Democrats | Anita Gerard | 784 | 45.3 | +6.3 |
| Labour | James Valentine | 534 | 30.8 | −9.8 |
| Better Bedford Party | Katherine Alder | 255 | 14.7 | N/A |
| Conservative | Barbara Purbrick | 158 | 9.1 | −1.9 |
| Majority | | 250 | 14.4 | |
| Turnout | | 1,731 | 27.2 | |
| Registered electors | | 6,419 | | |
| Liberal Democrats gain from Labour | | Swing | | |

=== Putnoe ===
Putnoe
| Party | Candidate | Votes | % | ±% |
|---|---|---|---|---|
| Liberal Democrats | Myrtle Stewardson* | 1,250 | 49.2 | +9.5 |
| Better Bedford Party | Glenn Farrar | 477 | 18.8 | N/A |
| Conservative | Ralph Hall | 427 | 16.8 | −9.5 |
| BNP | Richard Green | 223 | 8.8 | N/A |
| Labour | David Williams | 166 | 6.5 | −3.6 |
| Majority | | 773 | 30.4 | |
| Turnout | | 2,543 | 38.5 | |
| Registered electors | | 6,618 | | |
| Liberal Democrats hold | | Swing | | |

=== Roxton ===
Roxton
| Party | Candidate | Votes | % | ±% |
|---|---|---|---|---|
| Conservative | William Clarke* | 497 | 70.6 | −0.3 |
| Liberal Democrats | Sophia Stow | 132 | 18.8 | +7.8 |
| Labour | Rosemary Roome | 75 | 10.7 | −0.2 |
| Majority | | 365 | 51.8 | |
| Turnout | | 704 | 31.9 | |
| Registered electors | | 2,227 | | |
| Conservative hold | | Swing | | |

=== Sharnbrook ===
Sharnbrook
| Party | Candidate | Votes | % | ±% |
|---|---|---|---|---|
| Better Bedford Party | Douglas McMurdo | 491 | 54.2 | N/A |
| Conservative | Richard Davison-Francis* | 338 | 37.3 | −22.7 |
| Liberal Democrats | Michael Murphy | 43 | 4.7 | −0.6 |
| Labour | Yanina Jones | 34 | 3.8 | −3.4 |
| Majority | | 153 | 16.9 | |
| Turnout | | 906 | 45.5 | |
| Registered electors | | 2,001 | | |
| Better Bedford Party gain from Conservative | | Swing | | |

=== Turvey ===
Turvey
| Party | Candidate | Votes | % | ±% |
|---|---|---|---|---|
| Conservative | Celia Hanbury* | 560 | 70.4 | −1.6 |
| Better Bedford Party | Eric Evans | 84 | 10.6 | N/A |
| Liberal Democrats | Gerald Elliott | 77 | 9.7 | −18.3 |
| Labour | Yvonne Anderson | 74 | 9.3 | N/A |
| Majority | | 479 | 59.9 | |
| Turnout | | 795 | 36.7 | |
| Registered electors | | 2,171 | | |
| Conservative hold | | Swing | | |

=== Wilshamstead ===
Wilshamstead
| Party | Candidate | Votes | % | ±% |
|---|---|---|---|---|
| Independent | Anthony Hare* | 372 | 30.3 | −26.9 |
| Conservative | Victor Wilson-Maccormack | 286 | 23.3 | −33.9 |
| Liberal Democrats | Martin Parker | 231 | 18.8 | −15.1 |
| Better Bedford Party | Vivian Suter | 221 | 18.0 | N/A |
| Labour | Francer Garrick | 117 | 9.5 | N/A |
| Majority | | 86 | 7.0 | |
| Turnout | | 1,227 | 34.0 | |
| Registered electors | | 3,629 | | |
| Independent gain from Conservative | | Swing | | |

Anthony Hare was the incumbent councillor, originally elected for the Conservatives, but defected to become an independent. Because this seat is compared to the last time it was up for election it is shown as an independent gain.

=== Wootton ===
Wootton
| Party | Candidate | Votes | % | ±% |
|---|---|---|---|---|
| Liberal Democrats | Gordon Willey* | 553 | 44.2 | +8.5 |
| Conservative | Roy Judge | 450 | 36.0 | +2.9 |
| Better Bedford Party | Leslie Walker | 139 | 11.1 | N/A |
| Labour | Adrien Beardmore | 109 | 8.7 | −0.7 |
| Majority | | 103 | 8.2 | |
| Turnout | | 1,251 | 30.8 | |
| Registered electors | | 4,078 | | |
| Liberal Democrats hold | | Swing | | |
