= Bedfordshire Greensand Ridge =

Escarpment in the south and east of England

Coordinates: 51.918°N 0.661°W

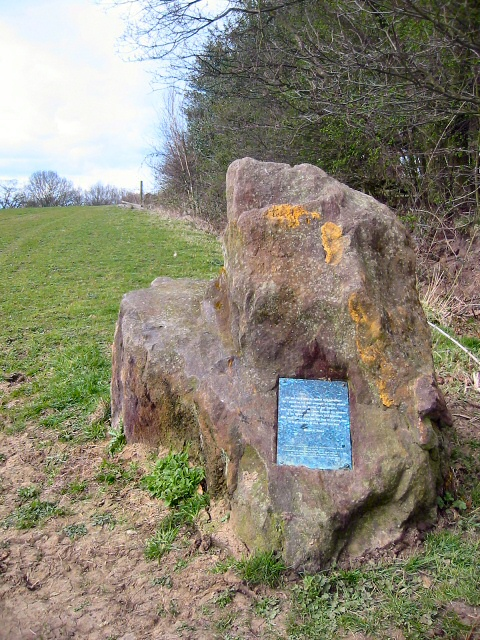
Marker stone near Ampthill Park

The Bedfordshire Greensand Ridge is an escarpment which runs through Buckinghamshire, Bedfordshire, and Cambridgeshire in the south and east of England. A pathway runs along the ridge from Leighton Buzzard to Gamlingay. In 2009, the Greensand Ridge Local Action Group was formed to help enhance and develop the Greensand Ridge area. The Group bid for funding from the Rural Development Programme for England and were successful. Since 2009, the Greensand Ridge Rural Development Programme, delivered by Bedfordshire Rural Communities Charity, has awarded grants to businesses and organisations which meet their objectives.

It is also a National Character Area.

There is only one hill within the NCA with more than 30 metres of topographic prominence: Bow Brickhill, at 171 m (561 ft), with 53 m of prominence and a grid reference of SP915344.

== See also ==
- Greensand Ridge, a similarly named ridge in Surrey, Sussex and Kent
