= 2011 Bedford Borough Council election =

2011 UK local government election

Results of the 2011 Bedford Borough Council election

The 2011 Bedford Borough Council election took place on 5 May 2011 to elect members of Bedford Borough Council in Bedfordshire, England. All 40 seats of the council were up for election and the council stayed under no overall control.

After the election, the composition of the council (with change) was:

- Labour 12 (+5)
- Liberal Democrat 12 (−1)
- Conservative 12 (+4)
- Independent 4 (−4)

== Results summary ==
Individual gains and losses are not given due to boundary changes.

Bedford local election result 2011
Party	Seats	Gains	Losses	Net gain/loss	Seats %	Votes %	Votes	+/−
Conservative	12			+4		36.63	30,375	
Labour	12			+5		28.63	23,737	
Liberal Democrats	12			-1		25.54	21,179	
Independent	4			-4		7.80	6,470	
Green	0					1.14	946	
UKIP	0					0.25	211	

=== By ward ===
Elected candidates in bold.

In multi-member wards, "majority" is the margin of votes between the lowest placed elected candidate and the highest placed non-elected candidate.

==== Brickhill ====
Brickhill (2 seats)
Party	Candidate	Votes	%	±%
**Liberal Democrats**	**Charles Royden***	**2,089**	**61.46**	
**Liberal Democrats**	**Wendy Rider***	**1,795**	**52.81**	
Conservative	Oliver Richbell	857	25.21	
Conservative	Paul Stonebridge	781	22.98	
Labour	Charles Baily	432	12.71	
Labour	Thoufique Ali	319	9.39	
Majority		938	27.60	
Turnout		3,469	53	
Liberal Democrats **win** (new seat)				
Liberal Democrats **win** (new seat)				

==== Bromham and Biddenham ====
Bromham and Biddenham (2 seats)
Party	Candidate	Votes	%	±%
**Conservative**	**Roger Rigby***	**1,929**	**66.27**	
**Conservative**	**Jon Gambold**	**1,832**	**62.93**	
Labour	Nicholas Luder	512	17.59	
Labour	Ashley Frith	434	14.91	
Liberal Democrats	Stelios Mores	334	11.47	
Liberal Democrats	Stephen Rutherford	213	7.32	
Majority		1,320	45.34	
Turnout		2,947	52	
Conservative **win** (new seat)				
Conservative **win** (new seat)				

==== Castle ====
Castle (2 seats)
Party	Candidate	Votes	%	±%
**Independent**	**Apu Bagchi***	**758**	**34.01**	
**Conservative**	**Caroline Fensome**	**571**	**25.62**	
Conservative	Shishum Miah	539	24.18	
Independent	Paul Ogden	486	21.80	
Labour	Chris Lowe	481	21.58	
Labour	Richard Johnson	477	21.40	
Liberal Democrats	Mags Brady	200	8.97	
Green	Lucy Bywater	180	8.08	
Liberal Democrats	John Ryan	162	7.27	
Green	Tony Upton	88	3.95	
Majority		32	1.44	
Turnout		2,264	43	
Independent **win** (new seat)				
Conservative **win** (new seat)				

==== Cauldwell ====
Cauldwell (two councillors)
Party	Candidate	Votes	%	±%
**Labour**	**Sue Oliver***	**1,087**	**46.77**	
**Labour**	**Randolph Charles***	**1,077**	**46.34**	
Liberal Democrats	Jake Sale	537	23.11	
Conservative	Kitty Sams	457	19.66	
Liberal Democrats	Lynn Southwell	449	19.32	
Conservative	Amanda Murrell	414	17.81	
Majority		540	23.23	
Turnout		2,359	37	
Labour **win** (new seat)				
Labour **win** (new seat)				

==== Clapham ====
Clapham (one councillor)
Party	Candidate	Votes	%	±%
**Conservative**	**Jane Walker***	**837**	**59.28**	
Labour	Jenni Jackson	437	30.95	
Liberal Democrats	Matthew Anscomb	138	9.77	
Majority		400	28.33	
Turnout		1,432	43	
Conservative **win** (new seat)				

==== De Parys ====
De Parys (two councillors)
Party	Candidate	Votes	%	±%
**Liberal Democrats**	**David Sawyer***	**1,072**	**44.74**	
**Liberal Democrats**	**Henry Vann**	**876**	**36.56**	
Conservative	Katherine Groves	786	32.80	
Conservative	Adrian Lennox-Lamb	780	32.55	
Labour	Frank McMahon	406	16.94	
Labour	Jane Pritchard	396	16.53	
Green	David Maxwell	128	5.34	
Majority		90	3.76	
Turnout		2,421	43	
Liberal Democrats **win** (new seat)				
Liberal Democrats **win** (new seat)				

==== Eastcotts ====
Eastcotts (one councillor)
Party	Candidate	Votes	%	±%
**Liberal Democrats**	**Sarah Holland***	**613**	**64.32**	
Conservative	Martine Moon	195	20.46	
Labour	James Grady	145	15.22	
Majority		418	43.86	
Turnout		960	42	
Liberal Democrats **win** (new seat)				

==== Elstow ====
Elstow (one councillor)
Party	Candidate	Votes	%	±%
**Liberal Democrats**	**Tim Hill***	**501**	**38.16**	
Conservative	Lynne Faulkner	434	33.05	
Independent	Tony Hare	203	15.46	
Labour	Sophie Sands	175	13.33	
Majority		67	5.11	
Turnout		1321	44	
Liberal Democrats **win** (new seat)				

==== Goldington ====
Goldington (two councillors)
Party	Candidate	Votes	%	±%
**Liberal Democrats**	**Sylvia Gillard***	**960**	**43.32**	
**Liberal Democrats**	**Phil Merryman***	**897**	**40.48**	
Labour	Anthony Forth	620	27.98	
Labour	Hazera Forth	582	26.26	
Conservative	John Robertson	542	24.46	
Conservative	Gillian Rose	454	20.49	
Majority		277	12.50	
Turnout		2,247	37	
Liberal Democrats **win** (new seat)				
Liberal Democrats **win** (new seat)				

==== Great Barford ====
Great Barford (two councillors)
Party	Candidate	Votes	%	±%
**Conservative**	**Carole Ellis***	**1,929**	**68.57**	
**Conservative**	**Stephen Moon**	**1,788**	**63.56**	
Labour	John Dawson	463	16.46	
Labour	Samuel Goodby	407	14.47	
Liberal Democrats	Sandra Thacker	404	14.36	
Liberal Democrats	Vanessa Holland	372	13.22	
Majority		1,325	47.10	
Turnout		2,854	50	
Conservative **win** (new seat)				
Conservative **win** (new seat)				

==== Harpur ====
Harpur (two councillors)
Party	Candidate	Votes	%	±%
**Labour**	**Colleen Atkins***	**1,483**	**58.43**	
**Labour**	**Louise King**	**1,065**	**41.96**	
Conservative	Mohammed Kabir	749	29.51	
Conservative	Domenico Canzoneri	626	24.67	
Liberal Democrats	Rosemary Bootiman	223	8.79	
Green	Greg Paszyski	199	7.84	
Green	Ben Foley	176	6.93	
Liberal Democrats	Paul Whitehead	169	6.66	
Majority		316	12.45	
Turnout		2,562	44	
Labour **win** (new seat)				
Labour **win** (new seat)				

==== Harrold ====
Harrold (one councillor)
Party	Candidate	Votes	%	±%
**Conservative**	**Alison Foster**	**850**	**46.83**	
Liberal Democrats	Nick Charsley*	802	44.19	
Labour	Stephen Poole	163	8.98	
Majority		48	2.64	
Turnout		1,832	58	
Conservative **win** (new seat)				

==== Kempston Central and East ====
Kempston Central and East (two councillors)
Party	Candidate	Votes	%	±%
**Labour**	**James Valentine**	**925**	**42.88**	
**Labour**	**Mohammed Nawaz**	**830**	**38.48**	
Conservative	Steve Collins	742	34.40	
Independent	Nicky Attenborough*	707	32.78	
Conservative	Robert Rigby	381	17.66	
Liberal Democrats	Janet Trengrove	155	7.19	
Liberal Democrats	Johana Woodruff	145	6.72	
Majority		88	4.08	
Turnout		2,180	41	
Labour **win** (new seat)				
Labour **win** (new seat)				

==== Kempston North ====
Kempston North (one councillor)
Party	Candidate	Votes	%	±%
**Labour**	**Shan Hunt**	**652**	**56.79**	
Conservative	Allan Geoffrey	417	36.32	
Liberal Democrats	Neal Bath	79	6.88	
Majority		235	20.47	
Turnout		1,163	39	
Labour **win** (new seat)				

==== Kempston Rural ====
Kempston Rural (one councillor)
Party	Candidate	Votes	%	±%
**Conservative**	**Mark Smith***	**863**	**57.50**	
Independent	Jim Weir	267	17.79	
Labour	Tim Caswell	259	17.26	
Liberal Democrats	Samuel Fisk	112	7.46	
Majority		596	39.71	
Turnout		1,514	50	
Conservative **win** (new seat)				

==== Kempston South ====
Kempston South (one councillor)
Party	Candidate	Votes	%	±%
**Labour**	**Carl Meader***	**1,021**	**75.63**	
Conservative	Richard Hyde	269	19.93	
Liberal Democrats	Philip Standley	60	4.44	
Majority		752	55.70	
Turnout		1,371	43	
Labour **win** (new seat)				

==== Kempston West ====
Kempston West (one councillor)
Party	Candidate	Votes	%	±%
**Labour**	**Will Hunt***	**624**	**53.79**	
Conservative	Robert Hamilton	473	40.78	
Liberal Democrats	Michael Murphy	63	5.43	
Majority		151	13.01	
Turnout		1,177	42	
Labour **win** (new seat)				

==== Kingsbrook ====
Kingsbrook (two councillors)
Party	Candidate	Votes	%	±%
**Labour**	**James Saunders**	**857**	**39.06**	
**Liberal Democrats**	**Anita Gerard***	**827**	**37.69**	
Liberal Democrats	Andrew Gerard*	808	36.83	
Labour	Abu Sultan	658	29.99	
Conservative	Alex Agius	395	18.00	
Conservative	Musla Uddin	298	13.58	
Majority		19	0.86	
Turnout		2,237	35	
Labour **win** (new seat)				
Liberal Democrats **win** (new seat)				

==== Newnham ====
Newnham (two councillors)
Party	Candidate	Votes	%	±%
**Conservative**	**John Mingay***	**981**	**36.65**	
**Conservative**	**Kirsty Adams**	**884**	**33.02**	
Liberal Democrats	Gianni Carofano	746	27.87	
Liberal Democrats	Chris Leslie	622	23.23	
Labour	Richard Crane	549	20.51	
Labour	June McDonald	464	17.33	
Independent	Ray Hostler	384	14.34	
Green	Nick Wilde	175	6.54	
Majority		138	5.15	
Turnout		2,706	49	
Conservative **win** (new seat)				
Conservative **win** (new seat)				

==== Oakley ====
Oakley (one councillor)
Party	Candidate	Votes	%	±%
**Independent**	**Pat Olney***	**1,361**	**84.06**	
Labour	Chrissie Holloway	149	9.20	
Liberal Democrats	Jason Parmar	109	6.73	
Majority		1,212	74.86	
Turnout		1,659	56	
Independent **win** (new seat)				

==== Putnoe ====
Putnoe (two councillors)
Party	Candidate	Votes	%	±%
**Liberal Democrats**	**Michael Headley***	**1,849**	**58.90**	
**Liberal Democrats**	**Sallyanne Smith***	**1,450**	**46.19**	
Conservative	Susan Spratt	878	27.97	
Conservative	Irfan Latif	664	21.15	
Labour	Franca Garrick	448	14.27	
Labour	David Lukes	425	13.54	
Majority		572	18.22	
Turnout		3,172	52	
Liberal Democrats **win** (new seat)				
Liberal Democrats **win** (new seat)				

==== Queens Park ====
Queens Park (two councillors)
Party	Candidate	Votes	%	±%
**Labour**	**Mohammad Yasin***	**2,114**	**60.31**	
**Labour**	**Mohammed Masud**	**1,767**	**50.41**	
Conservative	Parvez Akhtar	1,383	39.46	
Conservative	Nurul Islam	898	25.62	
Independent	Shanoor Miah	186	5.31	
Liberal Democrats	Richard Struck	118	3.37	
Liberal Democrats	Mahmud Rogers	103	2.94	
Majority		384	10.95	
Turnout		3,541	60	
Labour **win** (new seat)				
Labour **win** (new seat)				

==== Riseley ====
Riseley (one councillor)
Party	Candidate	Votes	%	±%
**Independent**	**Ian Clifton***	**1,007**	**63.25**	
Conservative	Martin Towler	426	26.76	
Labour	Patrick Pollard	114	7.16	
Liberal Democrats	Paul Steklis	45	2.83	
Majority		581	36.49	
Turnout		1,701	61	
Independent **win** (new seat)				

==== Sharnbrook ====
Sharnbrook (one councillor)
Party	Candidate	Votes	%	±%
**Independent**	**Doug McMurdo***	**1,111**	**59.16**	
Conservative	Martin Qunice	537	28.59	
Labour	Alistair Strathern	167	8.89	
Liberal Democrats	Stephen Lawson	63	3.35	
Majority		574	30.57	
Turnout		1,891	59	
Independent **win** (new seat)				

==== Wilshamstead ====
Wilshamstead (one councillor)
Party	Candidate	Votes	%	±%
**Conservative**	**Graeme Coombes**	**766**	**64.10**	
Labour	Susan Aykin	227	19.00	
Liberal Democrats	Conrad Longmore	202	16.90	
Majority		539	45.10	
Turnout		1,212	48	
Conservative **win** (new seat)				

==== Wootton ====
Wootton (one councillor)
Party	Candidate	Votes	%	±%
**Liberal Democrats**	**Paul Prescod**	**617**	**38.44**	
Conservative	John Wheeler	609	37.94	
UKIP	Bob Colman	211	13.15	
Labour	Adrien Beardmore	168	10.47	
Majority		8	0.50	
Turnout		1,622	50	
Liberal Democrats **win** (new seat)				

==== Wyboston ====
Wyboston (one councillor)
Party	Candidate	Votes	%	±%
**Conservative**	**Tom Wootton***	**1,161**	**76.43**	
Liberal Democrats	William Hilliard	200	13.17	
Labour	Terry Carroll	158	10.40	
Majority		961	63.26	
Turnout		1,535	53	
Conservative **win** (new seat)				
