= 2002 Bedford Borough Council election =

2002 UK local government election

Results of the 2002 Bedford Borough Council election

The 2002 Bedford Borough Council election took place on 2 May 2002 to elect members of Bedford Borough Council in England. This was on the same day as other local elections.

The whole council was up for election on new ward boundaries and the total number of seats increased by 1 from 53 to 54.

At the election, the Conservatives regained their position as the largest party, coming three seats away from taking majority control of the council.

== Summary ==
=== Election result ===
2002 Bedford Borough Council election
Party	This election			Full council			This election		
Party	Seats	Net	Seats %	Other	Total	Total %	Votes	Votes %	+/−
Conservative	25	▲12	46.3	0	25	46.3	30,517	37.8	+0.9
Labour	14	▼4	25.9	0	14	25.9	20,671	25.6	–3.3
Liberal Democrats	11	▼5	20.4	0	11	20.4	21,704	26.9	+0.1
Independent	4	▼2	7.4	0	4	7.4	7,634	9.5	+2.0
Green	0	Steady	0.0	0	0	0.0	245	0.3	N/A

== Ward results ==
=== Brickhill ===
Brickhill (3)
Party	Candidate	Votes	%	±%
Conservative	Peter Hand	1,301	48.6	
Conservative	Andrew McConnell	1,274	47.6	
Conservative	Lynne Faulkner	1,254	46.8	
Liberal Democrats	Janet Salem	1,068	39.9	
Liberal Democrats	David Sawyer	1,039	38.8	
Liberal Democrats	Michael Murphy	1,033	38.6	
Labour	Yvonne Anderson	313	11.7	
Labour	Karl Sorembik	277	10.3	
Labour	Philip Otubanjo	259	9.7	
Turnout		2,678	40.3	
Conservative win (new seat)				
Conservative win (new seat)				
Conservative win (new seat)				

=== Bromham ===
Bromham (3)
Party	Candidate	Votes	%	±%
Conservative	Terence Rigby	1,432	74.5	
Conservative	Eileen Whitmore	1,413	73.5	
Conservative	Robert Rigby	1,361	70.8	
Liberal Democrats	George Flaxman	312	16.2	
Liberal Democrats	Conrad Longmore	290	15.1	
Liberal Democrats	Stephen Rutherford	260	13.5	
Labour	Yarina Jones	236	12.3	
Turnout		1,922	33.7	
Conservative win (new seat)				
Conservative win (new seat)				
Conservative win (new seat)				

=== Carlton ===
Carlton (1)
Party	Candidate	Votes	%	±%
Independent	Jim Brandon	818	76.2	
Conservative	Anthony Morris	146	13.6	
Liberal Democrats	David Robertson	110	10.2	
Turnout		1,074	46.2	
Independent win (new seat)				

=== Castle ===
Castle (3)
Party	Candidate	Votes	%	±%
Labour	Apu Bagchi	1,050	46.8	
Conservative	Peter Chiswell	942	42.0	
Conservative	Margaret Davey	914	40.7	
Labour	Susanna Chirico	893	39.8	
Conservative	Edward Davey	849	37.8	
Labour	Marilyn Leask	829	36.9	
Liberal Democrats	Jacqueline Smithson	252	11.2	
Liberal Democrats	Janet Haddock	226	10.1	
Liberal Democrats	Brian Hill	207	9.2	
Turnout		2,245	36.7	
Labour win (new seat)				
Conservative win (new seat)				
Conservative win (new seat)				

=== Cauldwell ===
Cauldwell (3)
Party	Candidate	Votes	%	±%
Labour	Robert Elford	886	63.8	
Labour	Randolph Charles	850	61.2	
Labour	Christopher Black	811	58.4	
Liberal Democrats	Anita Gerard	211	15.2	
Conservative	Mary Fogg	166	12.0	
Liberal Democrats	Philip Standley	164	11.8	
Liberal Democrats	Season Prater	159	11.4	
Conservative	Jennifer Ridge	147	10.6	
Conservative	Margaret Thomas	135	9.7	
Turnout		1,389	24.0	
Labour win (new seat)				
Labour win (new seat)				
Labour win (new seat)				

=== Clapham ===
Clapham (2)
Party	Candidate	Votes	%	±%
Conservative	Mollie Foster	778	60.4	
Conservative	Judith Arnold	660	51.2	
Independent	John Creasey	396	30.7	
Labour	Terence Carroll	226	17.5	
Liberal Democrats	Gerald Elliott	107	8.3	
Liberal Democrats	Michelle Headley	101	7.8	
Turnout		1,288	31.6	
Conservative win (new seat)				
Conservative win (new seat)				

=== De Parys ===
De Parys (2)
Party	Candidate	Votes	%	±%
Liberal Democrats	John Ryan	642	45.1	
Conservative	Tarsem Paul	624	43.8	
Conservative	James Moore	618	43.4	
Liberal Democrats	Ian White	586	41.2	
Labour	Robert Atkins	151	10.6	
Labour	Charles Bally	150	10.5	
Turnout		1,424	34.9	
Liberal Democrats win (new seat)				
Conservative win (new seat)				

=== Eastcotts ===
Eastcotts (1)
Party	Candidate	Votes	%	±%
Liberal Democrats	Christine McHugh	371	54.4	
Conservative	Tom Wootton	269	39.4	
Labour	Caron Rosovske	42	6.2	
Turnout		682	36.3	
Liberal Democrats win (new seat)				

=== Goldington ===
Goldington (3)
Party	Candidate	Votes	%	±%
Liberal Democrats	Jennifer Heseltine	1,120	60.4	
Liberal Democrats	Patrick Naughton	1,114	60.1	
Liberal Democrats	Paul Smith	1,057	57.0	
Labour	Laurence Evans	408	22.0	
Labour	Elizabeth Grugeon	398	21.5	
Labour	David Williams	387	20.9	
Conservative	Denise Coates	233	12.6	
Conservative	Valerie Fulford	222	12.0	
Conservative	David Pask	220	11.9	
Independent	Anthony Cardus	96	5.2	
Independent	Vivienne Melville	72	3.9	
Independent	John Harrison	69	3.7	
Turnout		1,855	29.9	
Liberal Democrats win (new seat)				
Liberal Democrats win (new seat)				
Liberal Democrats win (new seat)				

=== Great Barford ===
Great Barford (2)
Party	Candidate	Votes	%	±%
Conservative	Robert Harrison	839	54.2	
Conservative	Carole Ellis	820	52.9	
Independent	David Rawlins	300	19.4	
Labour	Pauline Curl	253	16.3	
Liberal Democrats	Linda Carlton	188	12.1	
Independent	Stuart Mardlin	120	7.7	
Liberal Democrats	Paul Stekelis	118	7.6	
Independent	Jennifer Johnson	106	6.8	
Independent	Ian Johnson	82	5.3	
Turnout		1,549	37.9	
Conservative win (new seat)				
Conservative win (new seat)				

=== Harpur ===
Harpur (3)
Party	Candidate	Votes	%	±%
Labour	Hazel Mitchell	707	43.1	
Conservative	Brian Dillingham	686	41.8	
Labour	Ian Nicholls	658	40.1	
Labour	Julie Sturgess	635	38.7	
Conservative	David Fletcher	559	34.0	
Conservative	Richard West	558	34.0	
Liberal Democrats	Janet Trengrove	180	11.0	
Green	Colin Grimley	173	10.5	
Liberal Democrats	Samuel Wilson	161	9.8	
Liberal Democrats	Charlotte Hill	90	5.5	
Turnout		1,642	26.8	
Labour win (new seat)				
Conservative win (new seat)				
Labour win (new seat)				

=== Harrold ===
Harrold (1)
Party	Candidate	Votes	%	±%
Conservative	Martin Bridgman	463	66.1	
Labour	Stephen Poole	119	17.0	
Liberal Democrats	Margaret Gardner	118	16.9	
Turnout		700	32.5	
Conservative win (new seat)				

=== Kempston East ===
Kempston East (2)
Party	Candidate	Votes	%	±%
Conservative	Charlotte Attenborough	699	52.1	
Conservative	Georgina Coupe	619	46.1	
Labour	David Lewis	558	41.6	
Labour	Carl Meader	518	38.6	
Liberal Democrats	Jill Hoyle	90	6.7	
Liberal Democrats	Jane Josephs	74	5.5	
Turnout		1,342	31.1	
Conservative win (new seat)				
Conservative win (new seat)				

=== Kempston North ===
Kempston North (2)
Party	Candidate	Votes	%	±%
Labour	Susan Oliver	656	62.4	
Labour	Christopher Whitehead	588	55.9	
Conservative	Jennifer Gough	376	35.8	
Conservative	Mary Milner	347	33.0	
Liberal Democrats	Simon White	119	11.3	
Liberal Democrats	Kathleen Naughton	118	11.2	
Turnout		1,051	26.6	
Labour win (new seat)				
Labour win (new seat)				

=== Kempston South ===
Kempston South (3)
Party	Candidate	Votes	%	±%
Labour	Shan Hunt	686	40.9	
Labour	William Hunt	654	39.0	
Labour	Ray Oliver	630	37.5	
Independent	David Merry	544	32.4	
Independent	Danny Spain	541	32.2	
Independent	John Wignall	527	31.4	
Conservative	Lionel Milner	281	16.7	
Conservative	Amrit Kaur	237	14.1	
Conservative	Jagdish Singh	237	14.1	
Liberal Democrats	Timothy Hill	193	11.5	
Liberal Democrats	Paulette Lodge	165	9.8	
Liberal Democrats	Charles Parsons	129	7.7	
Turnout		1,678	30.0	
Labour win (new seat)				
Labour win (new seat)				
Labour win (new seat)				

=== Kingsbrook ===
Kingsbrook (3)
Party	Candidate	Votes	%	±%
Liberal Democrats	Shirley McKay	788	43.5	
Liberal Democrats	Dave Hodgson	771	42.6	
Labour	Derek Jones	734	40.6	
Labour	Elizabeth Luder	727	40.2	
Labour	Elizabeth Saunders	715	39.5	
Liberal Democrats	Tim Prater	706	39.0	
Conservative	Carolynne Eynon	200	11.0	
Conservative	Janet Suter	177	9.8	
Conservative	Vivian Suter	149	8.2	
Independent	Michael Blackledge	55	3.0	
Turnout		1,810	27.9	
Liberal Democrats win (new seat)				
Liberal Democrats win (new seat)				
Labour win (new seat)				

=== Newnham ===
Newnham (2)
Party	Candidate	Votes	%	±%
Conservative	John Mingay	498	39.9	
Conservative	Colin Crane	463	37.1	
Liberal Democrats	Paul Westerman	380	30.4	
Liberal Democrats	Neal Bath	376	30.1	
Labour	Richard Crane	356	28.5	
Labour	Franca Garrick	314	25.1	
Turnout		1,249	31.3	
Conservative win (new seat)				
Conservative win (new seat)				

=== Oakley ===
Oakley (1)
Party	Candidate	Votes	%	±%
Independent	Patricia Olney	545	78.0	
Conservative	Barbara Purbrick	84	12.0	
Labour	John Spicer	53	7.6	
Liberal Democrats	Anne Thomas	17	2.4	
Turnout		699	38.6	
Independent win (new seat)				

=== Putnoe ===
Putnoe (3)
Party	Candidate	Votes	%	±%
Liberal Democrats	Michael Headley	1,217	45.8	
Liberal Democrats	Linda Weerasirie	1,095	41.2	
Liberal Democrats	Myrtle Stewardson	1,056	39.7	
Conservative	Ralph Hall	698	26.3	
Conservative	Mark Adkin	672	25.3	
Conservative	Arthur Foster	632	23.8	
Independent	Brian Gibbons	546	20.5	
Independent	Heather Harvey	536	20.2	
Independent	Hilary Finlayson	521	19.6	
Labour	Rosemary Roome	269	10.1	
Labour	David Lukes	260	9.8	
Labour	Luigi Reale	235	8.8	
Turnout		2,659	40.1	
Liberal Democrats win (new seat)				
Liberal Democrats win (new seat)				
Liberal Democrats win (new seat)				

=== Queen's Park ===
Queen's Park (2)
Party	Candidate	Votes	%	±%
Labour	Frank Garrick	937	65.2	
Labour	Muhammad Khan	907	63.1	
Conservative	Michael Williams	188	13.1	
Conservative	Sion Eynon	180	12.5	
Liberal Democrats	Stephen Lawson	144	10.0	
Liberal Democrats	Gregory Webb	110	7.7	
Turnout		1,437	30.5	
Labour win (new seat)				
Labour win (new seat)				

=== Riseley ===
Riseley (1)
Party	Candidate	Votes	%	±%
Independent	Ian Clifton	873	80.5	
Conservative	Stewart Lister	72	6.6	
Green	Mark Powell	72	6.6	
Labour	James Dormer	46	4.2	
Liberal Democrats	Pierrette Lob-Levyt	12	1.1	
Independent	John Williams	10	0.9	
Turnout		1,085	51.4	
Independent win (new seat)				

=== Roxton ===
Roxton (1)
Party	Candidate	Votes	%	±%
Conservative	William Clarke	598	70.9	
Liberal Democrats	Sophia Stow	93	11.0	
Labour	Simon Ross	92	10.9	
Independent	David Melville	60	7.1	
Turnout		843	37.7	
Conservative win (new seat)				

=== Sharnbrook ===
Sharnbrook (1)
Party	Candidate	Votes	%	±%
Conservative	Richard Davison-Francis	542	60.0	
Independent	Geoffrey Hulatt	249	27.5	
Labour	Adrien Beardmore	65	7.2	
Liberal Democrats	Terence Outen	48	5.3	
Turnout		904	43.3	
Conservative win (new seat)				

=== Turvey ===
Turvey (1)
Party	Candidate	Votes	%	±%
Conservative	Celia Hanbury	652	72.0	
Liberal Democrats	Sarah Fogarty	253	28.0	
Turnout		905	42.0	
Conservative win (new seat)				

=== Wilshamstead ===
Wilshamstead (2)
Party	Candidate	Votes	%	±%
Conservative	Barry Huckle	855	63.4	
Conservative	Anthony Hare	771	57.2	
Liberal Democrats	Martin Parker	457	33.9	
Liberal Democrats	Malcolm Whiteman	377	28.0	
Turnout		1,348	39.7	
Conservative win (new seat)				
Conservative win (new seat)				

=== Wootton ===
Wootton (3)
Party	Candidate	Votes	%	±%
Liberal Democrats	Judith Cunningham	686	48.5	
Independent	Mark Smith	568	40.1	
Liberal Democrats	Gordon Willey	505	35.7	
Conservative	John Tait	501	35.4	
Conservative	Roy Judge	468	33.1	
Liberal Democrats	Karen Ledster	441	31.2	
Conservative	Anne Worboys	438	31.0	
Labour	Charan Sekhon	133	9.4	
Turnout		1,415	34.7	
Liberal Democrats win (new seat)				
Independent win (new seat)				
Liberal Democrats win (new seat)				
