= Cotton End =

Village in Bedfordshire, England

Coordinates: 52.1°N 0.4166°W

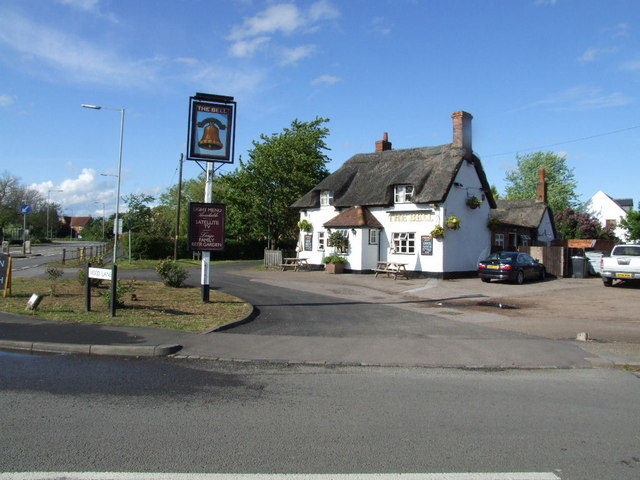
- The Bell public house

- Location within Bedfordshire
- Population: 838
- OS grid reference: TL084404
- Civil parish: Cotton End
- Unitary authority: Bedford
- Ceremonial county: Bedfordshire
- Region: East
- Country: England
- Sovereign state: United Kingdom
- Post town: BEDFORD
- Postcode district: MK45
- Dialling code: 01234
- Police: Bedfordshire
- Fire: Bedfordshire
- Ambulance: East of England
- UK Parliament: North Bedfordshire

Cotton End is a small village and civil parish in Bedfordshire, England. It became a parish as of 1 April 2019, having previously been part of the parish of Eastcotts. It is within the Borough of Bedford. Ordnance Survey maps from the 1880s show its name as 'Cardington Cotton End'.

The village is set along the A600, Bedford - Hitchin road, 3.5 miles (5.6 km) south-east of Bedford town centre.

Cotton End Forest School is a primary school established in 2019 catering for children from age 2 to 11, with an outdoor approach to education. It was designed by Nottingham-based Lungfish Architects and built by Wilmott Dixon largely of timber and has a capacity of 630. It replaced Cotton End Lower School, which was in school buildings dating back to 1875.

A Baptist meeting house was founded here in 1777. It was replaced by the current chapel, which was formerly opened on 12 April 1837. A census return carried out in 1851 reported the chapel had three galleries and 76 pews allowing up to 600 worshippers. Over the preceding year an average of 150 attended Sunday school in the morning and afternoon, 500 attended the morning service, 400 the afternoon and 150 in the evening. New Sunday Schools and a village room were opened in 1895. In the early 2000s the pews were removed and replaced by chairs, and the church floor was carpeted.

In 1912, Cotton End is described as a scattered hamlet.

Manor Farmhouse is the former manor house of Cotton End manor and dates from the late 16th century. It is of brick with stone dressings under a clay tile roof and listed Grade II*. An "elaborate" early 17th century plaster work ceiling features panels and borders depicting a coat of arms, birds, animals, foliage, grotesque figures and scriptural images. In 1752 the farm extended to 130 acres (53 ha), but by 1840 this had reduced to 95 acres (38 ha). An 18th-century dovecote stands in the grounds.

The Bell public house is Grade II listed. Documentary evidence held by Bedfordshire Archives dates the building to around 1780, but its listing places it in the 17th century. It has a colour washed, rough cast exterior and a thatched roof. It was owned by Bedford brewers Higgins and Sons by 1902, followed by Wells & Winch of Biggleswade in 1927 and from 1961 by Greene King. The Charles Wells-owned Harrows Public House built in 1899 on High Road closed in 2007 and has been converted into residential properties.

Other Grade II listed buildings in Cotton End are a house at 21 High Road, and cottages at 8 and 10 Bell Lane.

A new woodland created by the Forest of Marston Vale in 2005 called Shocott Spring.
