= List of mayors of Bedford (England) =

The first known reference to a Mayor of Bedford in England was in 1264.

Prior to the Municipal Corporations Act, 1835, the mayor of Bedford came into office on 29 September. The first mayor of the reformed corporation came into office on 1 January 1836, and subsequent mayors on 9 November. After the Local Government Act, 1948, and the Local Government Act, 1972, the mayors from 1949 onwards came into office in May. The civic mayor was replaced by a directly elected mayor in 2002.

Since April 2009 the Borough of Bedford is a unitary authority, with the executive having the powers and functions of both a non-metropolitan district and a non-metropolitan county.

== List of Mayors of Bedford ==
=== Civic mayors ===
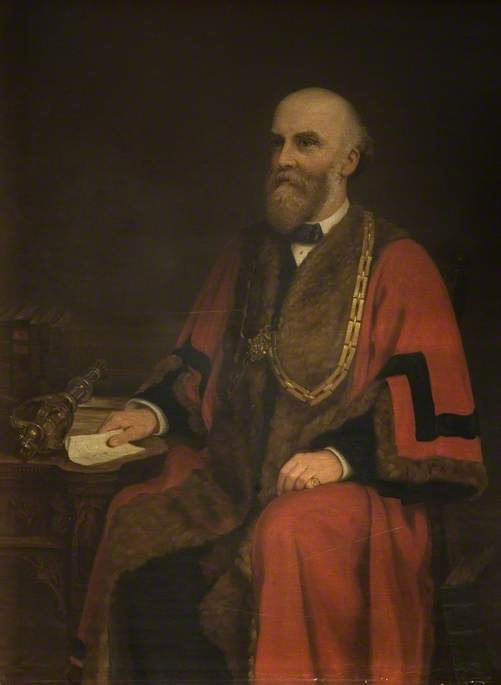
Joshua Hawkins - Mayor of Bedford

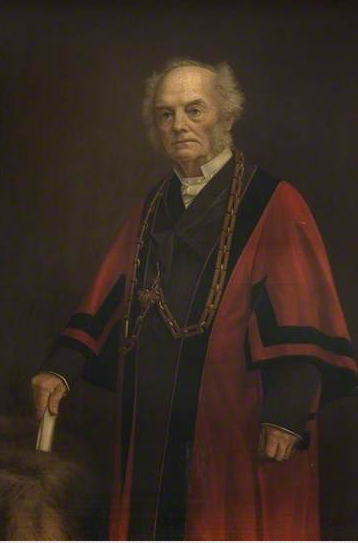
Alderman George Hurst (1800 - 1898), Mayor of Bedford (1855, 1873–4, 1878 and 1886)

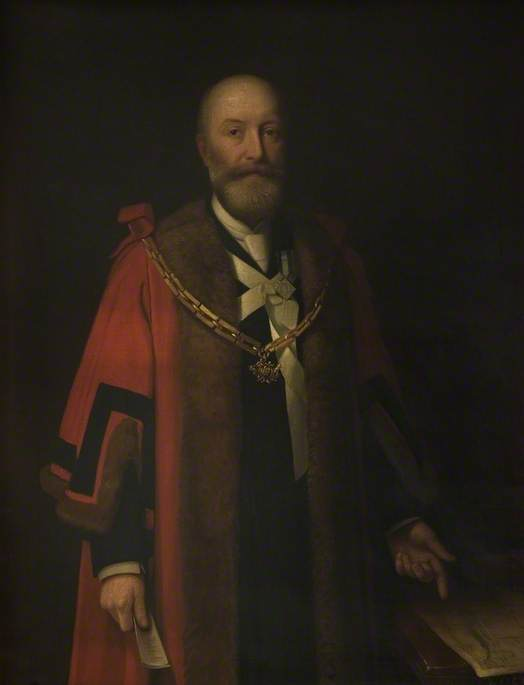
George Wells - Mayor in the 1890s

Source: bedsarchives

13th Century
Year	Name	Notes
C.1250	John Slye	Exact Year unknown
?	Simon Barschot	
?	John Brodeye	
1288	John	Last Name Unknown
1297	John Cullebere	Mayor 1297 and 1314

14th Century
Year	Name	Notes
1312-13	John Mareschall	
1313-14	John atte Wal	
1314-15	John Cullebere	Mayor 1297 and 1314
1315-16	Nicholas le Feroun	
1316-17	Nicholas le Feroun	
1319-20	John atte Wal	
1322-23	Thomas Haliday	
1324-25	Nicholas de Astwode	
1325-26	Nicholas de Astwode	
1327-28	Simon Cullebere	
1330-31	Simon Cullebere	
1331-32	Nicholas de Astwode	
1334-35	Richard Frereman	
1339-40	John le Marchal	
1341-42	John le Marchal	
1342-43	John le Marchal	
1343-44	John le Marchal	
1344-45	John le Marchal	
1346-47	Walter de Perle	
1347-48	Walter de Perle	
1348-49	Henry Arnold	
1349-50	John le Marchal	
1350-51	Henry Arnold	
1352-53	John le Marchal	
1354-55	Henry Arnold	
1356-57	Henry Arnold	
1358-59	William de Kempston	
1360-61	Henry Arnold	
1361-62	William de Kempston	
1362-63	William de Kempston	
1363-64	William de Kempston	
1365-66	William de Kempston	
1367-68	John Bosom	
1369-70	John Bosom	
1372-73	Richard Frereman	
1374-75	Richard Frereman	
1379-80	Richard Frereman	
1380-81	Thomas Jourdon	
1381-82	Thomas Jourdon	
1384-85	Thomas Jourdon	
1385-86	Thomas Jourdon	
1388-89	Thomas Jourdon	
1389-90	John Howden	
1390-91	Thomas Jourdon	
1392-93	William Brown	MP for Bedford, 1397
1393-94	Thomas Jourdon	
1398-99	Roger Tunstal	

15th Century
Year	Name	Notes
1400-01	Thomas Jourdon	
1401-02	Thomas Jourdon	
1402-03	Thomas Jourdon	
1404-05	William Coterstok	
1406-07	Roger Tunstale	
1407-08	Roger Tunstale	
1408-09	William Goderstoke	
1409-10	William Cothristoke	
1411-12	John Tunstal	
1412-13	John Tunstal	
1413-14	John Tunstal	
1414-15	John Kent	MP for Bedford, 1406
1416-17	John Kent	MP for Bedford, 1406
1418-19	William Douve	
1422-23	William Douve	
1423-24	William Douve	
1425-26	Thomas Kempston	
1426-27	Thomas Kempston	
1428-29	Thomas Bull	
1429-30	John Frepurs	MP for Bedford, 1417 and 1427
1432-33	Thomas Hunt	MP for Bedford, 1420
1433-34	Thomas Hunte	
1435-36	Robert Wasselyn	
1437-38	John Frepurs	MP for Bedford, 1417 and 1427
1438-39	William Hunte	
1440-41	Thomas Kempston	
1441-42	Robert Plomer	
1443-44	Wiilliam Bette	
1444-45	John Frepurs	MP for Bedford, 1417 and 1427
1445-46	John Frepurs	MP for Bedford, 1417 and 1427
1446-47	Thomas Kempston	
1447-48	Thomas Kempston	
1448-49	Roger Yve	
1449-50	Roger Yve	
1450-51	Thomas Bole	
1453-54	John Arthur	
1454-55	John Spery	
1455-56	John Spery	
1456-57	John Arthur	
1457	John Spery	
1457-58	Thomas Kempston	
1460-61	William Brytevyle	
1461-62	John Spery	
1462-63	William Brytevyle	
1466-67	William Cornnoeur	
1467-68	Walter Stotfold	
1469-70	Robert Rotur	
1470-71	William Chicheley	
1471-72	Walter Stotfold	
1472-73	Walter Stotfold	
1475-76	William Chicheley	
1476-77	Roger Sperling	
1477-78	John Chapman	
1478-79	John Gowlde	
1479-80	Philip Dyer	
1480-81	William Paryse	
1484-85	Thomas Hanchiche	
1486-87	John Goold	
1487-88	William Fitzhugh	
1490-91	John Goold	
1495-96	John Alwey	
1496-97	Thomas May	

16th Century
Year	Name	Notes
1504-05	Simon West	
1506-07	Robert Cokko	
1507-08	William Payne	
1508-09	Alexander Crowle	
1509-10	Robert Smyth	
1510-11	Simon West	
1511-12	Thomas Heche	
1512-13	Thomas Knyght	
1513-14	Richard Halam	
1514-15	Simon West	
1519-20	John Pateman	Butcher
1520-21	Thomas Vinter	
1521-22	Richard Halam	
1522-23	John Albony	
1527-28	Thomas Rowthe	
1528-29	John Baker	MP for Bedford, 1529
1529-30	Thomas West	
1534-35	Giles Lawrance	
1535-36	Thomas Smyth	
1537-38	John Baker	
1538-39	William Borme	
1541-42	William Forde	
1542-43	Peter Carre	
1543-44	Thomas Russell	
1544-45	Henry Albony	
1545-46	John Ward	
1546-47	John Williams	Alias 'Scotte'
1547-48	William Hall	MP for Bedford, 1554
1548-49	Henry Fitzhugh	
1549-50	John Williams	
1551-52	John Williams	
1553-54	William Forde	
1554-55	William Hall	MP for Bedford, 1554
1556-57	Thomas Leighe	
1557-58	Thomas Dyve	
1558-59	William Bull	
1559-60	Richard Lawrence	
1560-61	Humphrey Lawrence	
1562-63	Henry Lawrence	
1563-64	Simon Beckett	
1564-65	Alexander Hunt	
1565-66	Robert Paradyne	
1566-67	Henry Lawrence	
1573-74	Henry Lawrence	
1574-75	Alexander Hunt	
1575-76	Thomas Hawes	
1576-77	Simon Beckett	
1577-78	John Mighton	
1578-79	Robert Waller	
1580-81	Henry Lawrence	
1581-82	Alexander Hunte	
1583-84	John Mighton	
1584-85	Thomas Hawes Sr.	
1585-86	Robert Waller	
1586-87	Thomas Abbys	
1587-88	Thomas Hawes Jr.	
1588-89	Alexander Hunte	
1589-90	Richard Bell	
1590-91	Thomas Abbys	
1591-92	Thomas Hawes Sr.	
1592-93	Samuel Christye	
1593-94	William Wilson	
1594-95	Robert Waller	
1595-96	William Negus	
1596-97	Thomas Hawes Jr.	
1597-98	Thomas Abbys	
1598-99	John Stanton	
1599-00	Simon Beckett	

17th Century
Year	Name	Notes
1600-01	William Negus	
1601-02	Thomas Hawes Jr.	
1602-03	Thomas Hawes Jr.	
1603-04	Robert Lawrence	
1604-05	Thomas Abbys	
1605-06	Robert Hawes	
1606-07	Simon Beckett Sr.	
1607-08	James Payley	
1608-09	Jasper Chrystie	
1609-10	Thomas Hawes Jr.	
1610-11	Thomas Hawes Jr.	
1611-12	Peter Bamford	
1612-13	William Abbys	
1613-14	Thomas Paradine	
1614-15	Simon Beckett	
1615-16	John Goodhall	
1616-17	Jacob Lawrence	
1617-18	William Waller	
1618-19	Thomas Hawes Jr.	
1619-20	William Abbys	
1620-21	Robert Hawes	
1621-22	Robert Bamforth	
1622-23	Peter Bamforth	
1623-24	Thomas Spencer	
1624-25	William Faldoe	
1625-26	William Waller	
1626-27	William Abbys	
1627-28	Steven Luxford	
1628-29	John Spencer	
1629-30	Robert Bamforth	
1630-31	Thomas Waller	
1631-32	William Waller	
1632-33	Thomas Paradine	
1633-34	Thomas Hawes	
1634-35	William Abbys	
1635-36	Francis Bannester	
1636-37	John Whitaker	
1637-38	John Spencer	
1638-39	Robert Hawes	
1639-40	John Eston	
1640-41	Thomas Hawes	
1641-42	Robert Bamforth	
1642-43	Robert Bell	
1643-44	William Paley	
1644-45	Simon Beckett Sr.	
1645-46	Francis Bannester	
1646-47	John Grew	
1647-48	John Hancock	
1648-49	John Faldo	
1649-50	Henry Fitzhugh	
1650-51	John Eston	
1651-52	Robert Bell	
1652-53	William Faldo Sr.	
1653-54	Thomas Spencer	
1654-55	John Crawley	
1655-56	Simon Beckett Sr.	Removed from office
1656	Robert Fitzhugh	
1656	John Eston	Made Mayor: 19 March
1656	John Grew	Made Mayor: 21 March
1657-58	Richard Mightnall	
1658-59	John Hancock	
1659-60	John Eston	
1660-61	Robert Bell	
1661-62	Simon Becket	
1662-63	William Riseley	
1663-64	John Crawley	
1664-65	William Faldo Sr.	Died in office
1665	John White	
1665-66	John Crawley	
1666-67	William Faldo Jr.	
1667-68	Francis Becket	
1668-69	Thomas Underwood	
1669-70	William Faldo Jr.	
1670-71	William Lane	
1671-72	Richard Mightnall	
1672-73	Thomas Paley	
1673-74	John Crawley	
1674-75	John White	
1675-76	William Becket	
1676-77	Ralph Smith	
1677-78	Simon Beckett Sr.	
1678-79	William Fenn	Died in office
1679	Robert Fitzhugh	Made Mayor: 24 August
1679-80	William Bamforth	
1680-81	Anthony Bolton	
1681-82	Paul Bamforth	
1682-83	John Paradine	
1683-84	Paul Cobb Sr.	
1684-85	Paul Cobb Sr.	Died in office
1685-86	William Faldo Sr.	
1686-87	Francis Becket	
1687-88	Thomas Underwood	
1688	Paul Cobb	Made Mayor: 17 October, Attorney of Bedford Court 1658, Clerk of the Peace of the County
1688	Thomas Underwood	Made Mayor: 29 October
1688-89	William Isaack	
1689-90	William Becket	Made Mayor: 8 March
1690-91	John Eston	
1691-92	Thomas Battison	
1692-93	Ralph Smith	
1693-94	John Pawlin	
1694-95	John Peck	
1695-96	Richard Chichely	
1696-97	George Maddy	
1697-98	William Faldo	
1698-99	John Deare	
1699-00	John Kidd	

18th Century
Year	Name	Notes
1700-01	Thomas Wilkes	
1701-02	Thomas Battison	
1702-03	George Wagsuffe	
1703-04	Henry White	
1704-05	John Peck	
1705-06	John Fenn	Died in office
1706	Francis Walker	
1706-07	Thomas Underwood	Made Mayor: 24 January
1707-08	Thomas Day	
1708-09	Philip Negus	
1709-10	Robert Crawley	
1710	John Hornbuckle	
1710-11	Thomas Underwood	Made Mayor: 24 April
1711-12	William Faldo	
1712-13	Richard Willis	
1713-14	George Maddey	
1714-15	John Kidd	Died in office
1715	Alexander Read	
1715-16	Thomas Battison	Made Mayor: 8 February
1716-17	David Ovray	
1717-18	George Hawkins	
1718-19	William Staines	
1719-20	Francis Okeley	
1720-21	Thomas Wilkes	
1721-22	John Pulley	
1722-23	Thomas Battison Jr.	
1723-24	Henry Fleming	
1724-25	Thomas Day	
1725-26	William Bromsall	
1726-27	William Lake Sr.	
1727-28	John Bardolph	
1728-29	David Ovray	
1729-30	George Hawkins	
1730-31	William Staines	
1731-32	Thomas Cave	
1732–33	Thomas Hawes	
1733–34	Peter Haslewood	
1734–35	Francis Walker	
1735–36	Robert Battison	
1736–37	Thomas Edwards	
1737–38	Thomas Maddey	
1738–39	Gidney Phillips	
1739–40	John Grey	
1740–41	Samuel Richardson	
1741–42	Robert Battison	
1742–43	Isaac Hayes	
1743–44	John Hornbuckle	
1744–45	John Russell	
1745–46	John Webb	
1746–47	John Hill	
1747–48	William Webb	
1748–49	Samuel Richardson	
1749–50	James Bailey	
1750–51	Gidney Phillips	
1751–52	James Chamberlain	
1752–53	Thomas Cave	
1753–54	William Palmer	
1754–55	Robert Richards	Died in office
1755	Gidney Phillips	Made Mayor: 21 August
1755–56	Richard Gave	
1756–57	William Parker Sr.	
1757–58	John Howard	
1758–59	Richard Cave	
1759–60	John Hill	
1760–61	Samuel Richardson	
1761–62	William Webb	
1762–63	William Parker Jr.	
1763–64	John Cave	
1764–65	James Chamberlain	
1765–66	Thomas Knight	
1766–67	John Howard	
1767–68	Gidney Phillips	
1768–69	John Heaven	
1769–70	John Cawne	
1770–71	Richard Cave	
1771–72	William Parker Sr.	
1772–73	Edward Chapman	
1773–74	Gidney Phillips	
1774	John Cawne	Died in office
1774–75	Gidney Phillips	Made Mayor: 22 November
1775–76	John Parker	
1776–77	Anthony Barton	
1777–78	Gidney Phillips	
1778–79	John Palmer	
1779–80	William Parker Jr.	
1780–81	Anthony Barton	
1781–82	Thomas Howard	
1782–83	William Pateman	
1783–84	John Pheasant	
1784–85	John Cave	
1785–86	William Palmer	
1786–87	Thomas Partridge	
1787–88	William Smith	
1788–89	William Parker	
1789–90	William Smith	
1790–91	Thomas Clayton	
1791–92	Thomas Small	
1792–93	William Parker	
1793–94	John Wing	
1794–95	Thomas Cockman	
1795–96	Peregrine Nash	
1796–97	John Day	
1797–98	John Cooke	
1798–99	Charles Webb	
1799–00	Edward Chapman	

19th Century
Year	Name	Notes
1800-01	John Day	Made Mayor: 8 December
1801–02	William Smith	
1802–03	Isaac Elger	Father of Thomas Gwyn Elger, grandfather of Thomas Gwyn Empy Elger
1803–04	William Long	
1804–05	Francis Green	
1805–06	William Campion	
1806–07	Thomas Kidman	
1807–08	Peregrine Nash	
1808–09	John Wing	
1809–10	John Cooke	
1810–11	Grant David Yeats	
1811–12	Charles Short	
1812–13	John Day	
1813–14	William Long	
1814–15	Francis Green	
1815–16	Thomas Kidman	
1816–17	Charles Webb	
1817–18	John Wing	
1818–19	John Cooke	
1819–20	John Green	
1820–21	John Day	
1821–22	Charles Short	
1822–23	Sir William Long	
1823–24	Francis Green	
1824–25	Thomas Kidman	
1825–26	James Webb	
1826–27	Charles Short	
1827–28	Charles Bailey	
1828–29	George Livius	
1829–30	Sir William Long	Painting remains
1830–31	Thomas Gwyn Elger	Father of Thomas Gwyn Empy Elger, later mayor of Bedford
1831–32	Charles Bailey	
1832–33	George Peregrine Nash	
1833–34	Thomas Wooldridge	
1834–35	Dr. George Witt	Head of Bedford Infirmary and a Fellow of the Royal Society.
1835–36	Thomas Gwyn Elger	
1836–38	Charles Short	Made Mayor: 1 January
1838–39	Thomas Gwyn Elger	
1839–40	Thomas Abbott Green	
1840–41	Robert Newland	
1841–42	William Robert Mesham	
1842–43	Joseph Browne	
1843–45	Thomas John Green	
1845–46	Robert Newland	
1846–47	Alexander Sharman	
1847–48	Henry Leech	
1848–49	Charles Higgins	
1849–51	Charles Frederick Palgrave	
1851–53	William Williams	
1853–54	William Blower	
1854–55	Thomas Barnard	
1855–56	George Hurst	Painting remains
1856–57	William Wells Kilpin	
1857–58	George Handscomb Miller	
1858–62	John Howard	Painting remains
1862–63	Robert Couchman	
1863–65	James Howard	
1865–67	William Joseph Nash	
1867–69	Thomas Tokelove Gray	
1869–70	Augustus Edgar Burch	
1870–71	John Richard Bull	Painting remains
1871–72	James Coombs	Made Mayor: 15 November
1872–73	Frederick Thomas Young	
1873–75	George Hurst	Painting remains
1875–77	James Thomas Hobson	Painting remains
1877–78	John Usher Taylor	Died in office
1878	George Hurst	Made Mayor: 2 August
1878-79	Thomas Gwyn Empy Elger	Son of Thomas Gwyn Elger, also mayor of Bedford.
1879–80	John Elworthy Cutcliffe	
1880–81	James Thomas Hobson	Painting remains
1881–82	James Woodward Hill	
1882–83	Luke Cherry	
1883–85	Joshua Hawkins	Painting remains
1885–86	Edwin Ransom	
1886–87	George Hurst	Painting remains
1887–89	Joshua Hawkins	Painting remains
1889–90	James Coombs	
1890–91	Joshua Hawkins	Painting remains
1891–92	James Coombs	
1892–93	Frederick Augustus Blaydes	
1893–95	George Wells	Painting remains
1895–96	Frederick Augustus Blaydes	
1896–99	George Wells	Painting remains
1899–00	Hedley Baxter	

20th Century
Year	Name	Notes
1900–01	Henry Burridge	
1901–02	Geoffrey Howard	
1902–03	Hedley Baxter	Conservative, Resigned: 28 May 1903
1903	George Royle	Made Mayor: 8 June
1903–04	Edward Lavender Moulton	
1904–05	Henry Burridge	
1905–07	George Haynes	
1907–08	Samuel Leach Kilpin	
1908–09	Edward Lavender Moulton	
1909–10	Henry William Longhurst	
1910–11	John Basil Hope	
1911–12	William Roff	
1912–15	Harry Browning	
1915–17	Frederic Rich Hockliffe	
1917–18	Harry Browning	
1918–19	Frederic Rich Hockliffe	
1919–21	William Ernest Sowter	
1921–22	William Nicholls	
1922–27	Gilbert Henry Barford	
1927–28	William Nicholls	
1928–29	Gilbert Henry Barford	
1929–31	Samuel Blackwell Morling	
1931–32	George Hayward Wells	
1932–33	Samuel Blackwell Morling	
1933–36	Horace Richard Neate	
1936–38	Williarn Ernest Sowter	
1938–40	Archibald Braggins	
1940–42	Albert Maurice Dudeney	
1942–44	Frederick Arthur Rickard	
1944–47	John Albert Canvin	
1947–50	Alfred Leonard Nicholls	Term of office extended by Local Government Act 1948
1950–52	Richard Turner	
1952–53	Cyril Wickings-Smith	
1953–55	Clement Alexander Edward Charles Howard	
1955–57	Ronald George Gale	
1957-59	Albert Arthur Jones	
1959-60	Charles Naylor Barrott	Died in office
1960-62	Alan Herbert Randall	
1962-63	Alan Godfrey Dawes	
1963-65	George Reginald Bailey	
1965-66	Ronald Arthur Whittingham	
1966-67	Thomas Barratt Wooliscroft	
1967-68	Ronald Sharman	
1968–69	Kenneth John Robert Birtwistle	
1969–70	William Jarvis Martin	
1970–71	Ronald Arthur Whittingham	
1971–72	Winifred Mary Fowler	
1972–73	Henry Rischmiller	
1973–74	Graham Monro Bates	
1974–75	Brian Frank Dillingham	Following Local Government reorganisation
1975–76	Gilbert Cecil White Beazley	
1976–77	Thomas Robert Donnelly	Died in office
1977–78	Nora Margaret Polhill	
1978–79	Paul James Hooley	
1979–80	David Cayley Lennox-Lamb	
1980–81	Douglas Michael Bygrave	Died in office
1981–82	Victor John Wisson	
1982–83	George Alfred Senior	Died in office
1983–84	George Barry Wake	
1984–85	Victor Storrow	
1985–86	Brian Frank Dillingham	
1986–88	William Astle	
1988–89	Elizabeth Jane Luder	
1989–90	Sylvia Anne Gillard	
1990–91	Ray Lawrence Oliver	
1991–92	Janice Vera Lennon	
1992–93	Victor George Brandon	
1993–95	Derek Alan Jones	
1995–96	Malcolm Evans	
1996–97	Apu Bagchi	
1997–98	Frank Garrick	
1998–99	Anthony Victor Ruffin	
1999–00	Carole Ellis	

21st Century
Year	Name	Notes
2000–01	Hazel Mary Mitchell	
2001–02	Pat Olney	
2002	Judith Cunningham	

=== Directly elected mayors ===
21st Century
Year	Name	Notes
2002–09	Frank Branston	Died in office and first directly elected mayor
2009–23	Dave Hodgson	
2023–	Tom Wootton	

== See also ==
- Mayor of Bedford
