= St Paul's Theological College, Mauritius =

Former Anglican theological college in Mauritius

St Paul's Theological College (1876–2004) was an Anglican theological college for the Diocese of Mauritius in Beau Bassin-Rose Hill. It was replaced by the Diocesan Training Centre.

== Origins ==
The college traced its origins to the establishment in 1869 of an institution for the training of catechists and teachers near the church at Beau Bassin. The college itself was founded in 1876 in Beau Bassin by the Rev Henry Buswell.

== History ==
In 1905 Bishop Francis Gregory bought a house with a couple of acres opposite St Andrew's School at Ambrose Street, Rose Hill as a training college; the theological training moved there. The College closed for WWI, and re-opened in 1920. In 1925 it started granting a Licentiate of Theology, based on the Durham L.Th.

The college was destroyed by Cyclone Carol in 1960. Lectures were subsequently held at St James's Cathedral, Port Louis. The college applied a 'tentmaker' form of ministry, whereby ordinands were trained whilst still working in their secular occupations, and continued to work in them after ordination. It reopened in 1979.

== Closure ==
The college closed in 2004 when it was amalgamated with the Bishop Ghislain Emmanuel Library to form the Diocesan Training Centre.

== Principals ==
- William Alfred Norton, 1925-27
- Ronald Dupré Grange-Bennett, 1927-31
- Edwin Curtis, 1937–44. Subsequently Bishop of Mauritius and Archbishop of the Indian Ocean.
- Ghislain Emmanuel, 1964–76. Subsequently Bishop of Mauritius.

== Directors ==
- The Rev Donald Westwood Smith, 1979-1984 Subsequently, Bishop of Toamasina.

== Notable alumni ==
- Rex Donat, Bishop of Mauritius, 1984-2001
- Ian Ernest, Bishop of Mauritius, 2001-19
- Wavel Ramkalawan, President of the Seychelles since 2020.
