= 2016 Thomas Cup qualification =

Tournament details
- Dates: 15 – 20 February 2016
- Venue: BA: GMC Balayogi Indoor Stadium; BCA: National Badminton Centre; BE: Kazan Gymnastics Center; BO: X-TRM North Harbour Centre; BPA: CODE II Jalisco
- Location: BA: Hyderabad, India; BCA: Rose Hill, Mauritius; BE: Kazan, Russia; BO: Auckland, New Zealand; BPA: Guadalajara, Mexico

The 2016 Thomas Cup qualification process is a series of tournaments organised by the five BWF confederations to decide 14 of the 16 teams which will play in the 2016 Thomas Cup, with China qualifying automatically both as hosts, and Japan as the trophy holder.

== Qualified teams ==
Country	Confederation	Qualified as	Qualified on	World Team Rankings	Final appearance
China	Badminton Asia	Host country	May 2014	1st	18th
Japan	Badminton Asia	2014 Thomas Cup winner	25 May 2014	5th	14th
South Africa	Badminton Africa	2016 Africa Team Championships winner	19 February 2016	33rd	4th
India	Badminton Asia	2016 Asia Team Championships semifinalists	19 February 2016	7th	11th
Indonesia	Badminton Asia	2016 Asia Team Championships semifinalists	19 February 2016	4th	26th
South Korea	Badminton Asia	2016 Asia Team Championships semifinalists	19 February 2016	3rd	17th
Denmark	Badminton Europe	2016 European Team Championships semifinalists	19 February 2016	2nd	29th
England	Badminton Europe	2016 European Team Championships semifinalists	19 February 2016	11th	14th
France	Badminton Europe	2016 European Team Championships semifinalists	19 February 2016	13th	2nd
Germany	Badminton Europe	2016 European Team Championships semifinalists	19 February 2016	12th	7th
New Zealand	Badminton Oceania	2016 Oceania Team Championships winner	20 February 2016	39th	7th
Mexico	Badminton Pan Am	2016 Pan Am Team Championships winner	20 February 2016	18th	Debut
Malaysia	Badminton Asia	Best ranking (Asia)	3 March 2016	6th	26th
Chinese Taipei	Badminton Asia	Best ranking (overall)	3 March 2016	8th	2nd
Hong Kong	Badminton Asia	Best ranking (overall)	3 March 2016	9th	4th
Thailand	Badminton Asia	Best ranking (overall)	3 March 2016	10th	12th

== Qualification process ==
The number of teams participating in the final tournament is 16. The allocation of slots for each confederation is 4 from each Asia and Europe, and 1 from each Africa, Oceania and Pan Am. Two automatic qualifiers are the host and defending champion. The remaining quota will be filled by World Team Ranking.

== Confederation qualification ==
=== Badminton Confederation of Africa ===
The qualification for the African teams was held from 16 to 19 February 2016, at the National Badminton Centre in Rose Hill, Mauritius. The winners of the African qualification will qualified for the Thomas Cup.

==== Teams in contention ====
Teams qualified for the Group stage

- Algeria
- Ghana
- Mauritius
- Réunion
- South Africa
- Uganda
- Zimbabwe

==== First round (group stage) ====
Advance to Knockout stage

Group A

Pos	Team	Pld	Pts
1	South Africa	3	3
2	Mauritius	3	2
3	Réunion	3	1
4	Zimbabwe	3	0

Source: TS
Group B

Pos	Team	Pld	Pts
1	Algeria	2	2
2	Ghana	2	1
3	Uganda	2	0

Source: TS

==== Second round (knockout stage) ====
Semi-finals
18 February
South Africa	3
Ghana	1
18 February
Mauritius	3
Algeria	0

Final
19 February
South Africa	3
Mauritius	1

=== Badminton Asia ===
The qualification for the Asian teams was held from 15 to 21 February 2016, at the GMC Balayogi Indoor Stadium in Hyderabad, India. The semi-finalist of the Asian qualification will qualified for the Thomas Cup. China qualifying automatically as hosts. Japan also qualifying automatically as trophy holder.

==== Teams in contention ====
Teams qualified for the Group stage

- China (qualified)
- Hong Kong
- Indonesia
- India
- Japan (qualified)
- Malaysia
- Maldives
- Nepal
- Philippines
- Singapore
- Sri Lanka
- South Korea
- Chinese Taipei
- Thailand

==== First round (group stage) ====
Advance to Knockout stage

Group A
Group B

Pos	Team	Pld	Pts
1	India	2	2
2	China	2	1
3	Singapore	2	0

Source: TS

Pos	Team	Pld	Pts
1	Japan	3	3
2	Malaysia	3	2
3	Sri Lanka	3	1
4	Nepal	3	0

Source: TS
Group C
Group D

Pos	Team	Pld	Pts
1	Indonesia	3	3
2	Chinese Taipei	3	2
3	Thailand	3	1
4	Maldives	3	0

Source: TS

Pos	Team	Pld	Pts
1	South Korea	2	2
2	Hong Kong	2	1
3	Philippines	2	0

Source: TS

==== Second round (knockout stage) ====
Quarter-finals
19 February
South Korea (1)	3
China	0
19 February
Japan (3)	3
Chinese Taipei	0
19 February
Malaysia	2
India (4)	3
19 February
Hong Kong	0
Indonesia (2)	3

Semi-finals
20 February
South Korea (1)	0
Japan (3)	3
20 February
India (4)	1
Indonesia (2)	3

Final
21 February
Japan (3)	2
Indonesia (2)	3

=== Badminton Europe ===
The qualification for the European teams was held from 15 to 21 February 2016, at the Kazan Gymnastics Center in Kazan, Russia. The semi-finalist of the European qualification will qualified for the Thomas Cup.

==== Teams in contention ====
Teams qualified for the Group stage

- Austria
- Belgium
- Bulgaria
- Croatia
- Czech Republic
- Denmark
- England
- Estonia
- Finland
- France
- Germany
- Hungary
- Ireland
- Italy
- Lithuania
- Norway
- Poland
- Russia
- Scotland
- Slovakia
- Slovenia
- Spain
- Sweden
- Turkey
- Ukraine

==== First round (group stage) ====
Advance to Knockout stage

Group 1
Group 2
Group 3

Pos	Team	Pld	Pts
1	Denmark	3	3
2	Croatia	3	2
3	Finland	3	1
4	Turkey	3	0

Source: TS

Pos	Team	Pld	Pts
1	England	3	3
2	Bulgaria	3	2
3	Estonia	3	1
4	Hungary	3	0

Source: TS

Pos	Team	Pld	Pts
1	Germany	3	3
2	Czech Republic	3	2
3	Ireland	3	1
4	Lithuania	3	0

Source: TS
Group 4
Group 5
Group 6

Pos	Team	Pld	Pts
1	France	3	3
2	Sweden	3	2
3	Scotland	3	1
4	Slovakia	3	0

Source: TS

Pos	Team	Pld	Pts
1	Russia	3	3
2	Ukraine	3	2
3	Austria	3	1
4	Slovenia	3	0

Source: TS

Pos	Team	Pld	Pts
1	Poland	4	4
2	Spain	4	3
3	Belgium	4	2
4	Norway	4	1
5	Italy	4	0

Source: TS

Ranking of runners-up

Pos	Grp	Team	Pld	W	L	MF	MA	MD	GF	GA	GD	PF	PA	PD	Pts	Qualification
1	4	Sweden	3	2	1	11	4	+7	22	10	+12	607	490	+117	2	Knockout stage
2	5	Ukraine	3	2	1	11	4	+7	22	12	+10	628	586	+42	2	Knockout stage
3	6	Spain	3	2	1	9	6	+3	21	13	+8	627	580	+47	2	
4	3	Czech Republic	3	2	1	9	6	+3	19	15	+4	619	570	+49	2	
5	2	Bulgaria	3	2	1	7	8	−1	16	20	−4	641	673	−32	2	
6	1	Croatia	3	2	1	6	9	−3	15	19	−4	565	608	−43	2	

Source: BWF
Rules for classification: Due to group 6 having different number of teams, the results against the fifth-placed teams are not considered for this ranking.

==== Second round (knockout stage) ====
Quarter-finals
19 February 2016
Denmark	3
Russia	1
Germany	3
Sweden	0
Ukraine	0
France	3
Poland	0
England	3

Semi-finals
20 February 2016
Denmark	3
Germany	0
France	3
England	2

Final
21 February 2016
Denmark	3
France	1

=== Badminton Oceania ===
The qualification for the Pan Am teams was held from 19 to 20 February 2016, at the X-TRM North Harbour Centre in Auckland, New Zealand. The winner of the Oceania qualification will qualified for the Thomas Cup.

==== Teams in contention ====
Teams qualified for the Group stage

- Australia
- New Caledonia
- New Zealand
- Tahiti

==== Round-robin ====
Pos	Team	Pld	W	L	MF	MA	MD	GF	GA	GD	PF	PA	PD	Pts	Qualification
1	New Zealand	3	3	0	14	1	+13	28	4	+24	648	372	+276	3	Thomas Cup
2	Australia	3	2	1	11	4	+7	24	9	+15	638	451	+187	2	
3	Tahiti	3	1	2	4	11	−7	9	23	−14	449	635	−186	1	
4	New Caledonia	3	0	3	1	14	−13	3	28	−25	366	643	−277	0	

Source: TS

=== Badminton Pan Am ===
The qualification for the Pan Am teams was held from 17 to 20 February 2016, at the CODE II Jalisco in Guadalajara, Mexico. The winner of the Pan Am qualification will qualified for the Thomas Cup.

==== Teams in contention ====
Teams qualified for the Group stage

- Canada
- Guatemala
- Mexico
- United States

==== First round (group stage) ====
Pos	Team	Pld	W	L	MF	MA	MD	GF	GA	GD	PF	PA	PD	Pts	Qualification
1	Mexico	3	3	0	10	5	+5	23	13	+10	686	623	+63	3	Final
2	Canada	3	2	1	8	7	+1	18	17	+1	624	608	+16	2	Final
3	Guatemala	3	1	2	8	7	+1	20	18	+2	682	651	+31	1	
4	United States	3	0	3	4	11	−7	11	24	−13	559	669	−110	0	

Source: TS

==== Second round (final) ====
Team 1	Score	Team 2
Mexico	3–2	Canada

== World team rankings ==
Below is the chart of the BWF World Team Ranking calculated by adding World Ranking of top three Men's Singles players and top two Men's Doubles pairs on 3 March 2016.

Rank	Conf.	Nation	Points	Continental results	Qualification status
1	BA	China	379,132	Quarterfinals	Qualified as host
2	BE	Denmark	330,171	Winner	Qualified as BE semifinalists
3	BA	South Korea	305,570	Semifinals	Qualified as BA semifinalists
4	BA	Indonesia	279,614	Winner	Qualified as BA semifinalists
5	BA	Japan	269,608	Runner-up	Qualified as trophy holder
6	BA	Malaysia	241,788	Quarterfinals	Qualified by ranking (Asia)
7	BA	India	226,171	Semifinals	Qualified as BA semifinalists
8	BA	Chinese Taipei	225,742	Quarterfinals	Qualified by ranking (overall)
9	BA	Hong Kong	194,425	Quarterfinals	Qualified by ranking (overall)
10	BA	Thailand	168,277	Group stage	Qualified by ranking (overall)
11	BE	England	153,046	Semifinals	Qualified as BE semifinalists
12	BE	Germany	135,683	Semifinals	Qualified as BE semifinalists
13	BE	France	133,240	Runner-up	Qualified as BE semifinalists
14	BE	Russia	126,154	Quarterfinals	
15	BPA	United States	106,273	4th place	
16	BE	Poland	103,472	Quarterfinals	
17	BPA	Canada	91,988	Runner-up	
18	BPA	Mexico	91,593	Winner	Qualified as the winner of BPA
19	BPA	Brazil	90,189		
20	BE	Ukraine	85,664	Quarterfinals	
21	BA	Singapore	82,179	Group stage	
22	BPA	Guatemala	74,685	3rd place	
23	BE	Austria	74,359	Group stage	
24	BE	Belgium	72,602	Group stage	
25	BE	Italy	70,836	Group stage	
26	BE	Netherlands	68,536'		
27	BE	Scotland	65,891	Group stage	
28	BE	Spain	64,728	Group stage	
29	BE	Finland	64,728	Group stage	
30	BE	Sweden	63,841	Quarterfinals	
31	BE	Turkey	58,039	Group stage	
32	BCA	Egypt	57,650		
33	BCA	South Africa	56,785	Winner	Qualified as the winner of BCA
34	BE	Czech Republic	55,538	Group stage	
35	BE	Ireland	52,767	Group stage	
36	BO	Australia	52,231	Runner-up	
37	BA	Vietnam	51,677		
38	BE	Switzerland	48,599		
39	BO	New Zealand	44,235	Winner	Qualified as the winner of BO
40	BA	Iran	42,340		
41	BE	Estonia	39,566	Group stage	
42	BPA	Peru	38,950		
43	BA	Philippines	37,828	Group stage	
44	BE	Israel	37,398		
45	BPA	Dominican Republic	34,820		
46	BE	Croatia	34,109	Group stage	
47	BPA	Cuba	33,420		
48	BE	Bulgaria	32,044	Group stage	
49	BCA	Algeria	30,584	Semifinals	
50	BA	Sri Lanka	30,506	Group stage	
50+ participant
51	BE	Norway	30,302	Group stage	
53	BCA	Uganda	29,525	Group stage	
55	BE	Lithuania	27,497	Group stage	
57	BE	Slovakia	25,992	Group stage	
58	BCA	Mauritius	23,868	Runner-up	
60	BE	Slovenia	19,775	Group stage	
62	BCA	Ghana	17,071	Group stage	
65	BA	Nepal	15,435	Group stage	
67	BE	Hungary	15,048	Group stage	
82	BO	New Caledonia	7,356	4th place	
91	BA	Maldives	4,295	Group stage	
107	BO	Tahiti	1,440	3rd place	
108	BCA	Réunion	1,249	Group stage	
–	BCA	Zimbabwe	0	Group stage	
