= Edwin Curtis =

Ernest Edwin Curtis (24 December 1906 – 15 August 1999) was an Anglican Archbishop in the second half of the 20th century.

== Early life ==
He was born on Christmas Eve, 1906 in Stalbridge and educated at Foster's School in Sherborne and Imperial College London, becoming an associate member of the Royal College of Science in 1927. After teaching at Lindisfarne College, Westcliff-on-Sea, he trained for ordination at Wells Theological College.

== Career ==
Made deacon on Trinity Sunday 1933 (11 June) and ordained priest the following Trinity (27 May 1934) — both times by Michael Furse, Bishop of St Albans, at St Albans Cathedral, he began his career as a curate at Holy Trinity, Waltham Cross. From 1937 to 1944 he was chaplain in charge of Rose Hill and Bambous, Mauritius and principal of St Paul's Theological College. On his return to England he was priest in charge of St Wilfrid, Portsmouth, then vicar of All Saints, in the same city. After this he was rural dean of Alverstoke before his elevation to the Anglican episcopate in 1966 as Bishop of Mauritius until 1976, when he was succeeded by Ghislain Emmanuel, the first native Mauritian bishop but who died soon after his consecration, and then Trevor Huddleston. Curtis was consecrated a bishop on All Saints' Day (1 November) 1966, by Michael Ramsey, Archbishop of Canterbury, at Southwark Cathedral. Later he became the first archbishop of the Indian Ocean.

== Personal life ==
He married Dorothy Hill in 1937, and had a son and a daughter. After his first wife's death, he married secondly, in 1970, Evelyn Josling. He died on 15 August 1999 at the age of 92.

== Notes ==
Anglican Communion titles
Preceded by Alan Francis Bright Rogers	Bishop of Mauritius; 1966–1976	Succeeded by Ghislain Elwyn Emmanuel
New title	Archbishop of the Indian Ocean; 1973–1976	Succeeded by Trevor Huddleston
