= Diocesan Training Centre (Mauritius) =

Anglican theological college and library in Mauritius

The Diocesan Training Centre (formally The Diocesan Training Centre for Ministries and Community Development of the Anglican Church in Mauritius ) is a Mauritian educational institution in Rose Hill, Mauritius established in 2004.

== The Centre ==
It was established in 2004 as an amalgamation of St Paul's Theological College and the Bishop Ghislain Emmanuel Library. The centre offers both theological training for Anglican ordinands and also ecumenical theological education.

== Directors ==
- Brian Marajh, 2004–2008, subsequently Bishop of George in South Africa.
- David Doveton
- Colin Peattie
- Oliver Simon, 2010–2012, subsequently Bishop of Antsiranana in Mauritius.
- P. J. Lawrence, 2013–2016, previously Bishop of Nandyal in the Church of South India.
- Dr Yesudoss Moses
