= St. Andrew's School (Mauritius) =

St Andrew's School

Location
- 35 Ambrose Street , Rose Hill; Rose-Hill; Mauritius; 20.2392°S 57.4670°E

Information
- Type: Secondary School
- Motto: Ad Majorem Dei Gloriam (For the God's Greater Glory)
- Religious affiliation: Anglican
- Established: February 8, 1943
- School district: Plaines Wilhems
- Grades: Grade 7 - Grade 13 (Form 1 to Upper 6)
- Colors: White & Blue
- Information: TEL : (+230) 454 1648; FAX : (+230) 454 3566
- Manager: Very Reverend Bryen Adeline
- Rector: Miss Floriane L'aventure
- Website: http://www.standrewschool.info/

St. Andrew's School is a private, Anglican secondary school in Rose-Hill, Mauritius. It is commonly referred to as SAS. It was founded in February 1943 by Father Alan Rogers in his study at the parsonage of St Paul's, Vacoas, under the blessing of Bishop Hugh Otter-Barry. It was a non-fee paying school, the first coeducational and only Anglican secondary school in Mauritius.

== History ==
Saint Andrew's was founded by Father Alan Rogers on 8 February 1943. The school began with 16 boys and girls as students. The next year in March 1944 the school moved to St Paul's Theological College opposite the present location in Ambrose Street, Rose Hill. This was made possible with the help of the Theological College.

In 1945, Alan Rogers thought that the establishment required a permanent building. In 1946, he left for the United Kingdom to raise the necessary funds. A fundraiser is also organized in Mauritius.

In May 1946, Rogers left, for health reasons, handing over the duties of Warden to the Rev. Thomas Pritchard, B.A. In September 1946, the 29-year-old the Reverend Gordon Williams McAvan, A. K. C., Chaplain of Radley College, took over as Warden, while Canon Rogers remained on the staff for a term as chaplain. By then the school's population was around 125. On 15 June 1950, the St Andrew's College Foundation was established by Ordinance No.30 of 1950 on the wish of Dr the Honourable Edgar Laurent, C.M.G., M.D., Lic-ès-Sc. This was to enable the building of the School to be completed and to provide secondary education for Mauritian youth of both sexes. In 1952 the school entered its first candidates for the H.S.C. exams.

In June 1961, in her Birthday Honours list, H.M. the Queen conferred the OBE on Canon McAvan in recognition of his devoted service to the cause of education. In February 1962, owing to health problems, McAvan went on leave and did not come back, taking up instead parochial ministry in England. In July 1962 Mr John Russan, B.A., succeeded as Warden. December 1967 saw the departure of the last expatriate staff and appointment of the first Mauritian Warden, the Rev. Rex Donat at the head of a completely Mauritian staff. He had been a pupil of the school from 1948 to 1954 and also a member of the teaching staff of the school in 1961.

Ham Koung [John] Ng Lung Kit became the first laureate (Science side) of St Andrew's in February 1972; he later obtained his FRCS from Edinburgh Royal College of Surgeons and is today Managing Director of Clinique Mauricienne.) In May 1984, Donat vacated his post to become Bishop of Mauritius and was succeeded by Mr Donald Runghen, B.A., P.G.C.E., as rector since the title of Warden was phased out. In 1995, Prof Goolam Mohamedbhai, former student of St Andrew's School was appointed as the Vice Chancellor of the University of Mauritius. On 1 October 2000, Mrs. Indira Manrakhan became the first lady rector of St Andrew's on the retirement of Mr Runghen and the Rev. Michael Chuttooa was appointed as Manager of the school. She was then succeeded by Mrs. Mirella Couronne in 2002 who kept her position as rector of the school until 2010 when she retired to be succeeded by Mrs Floriane Laventure who is currently managing the school. On 8 February 2008, the school had its second laureate (Science Side) in the person of Kaneesh Munbodh.

== Notable alumni ==
- Sydney Pierre Deputy of circonscription number 19 Stanley Rose-Hill
- Dharam Gokhool - President of the Republic of Mauritius
- Daniel André - Sprinter, 1984 Summer Olympics
- Vivian Coralie - Field athlete, 1984 Summer Olympics
- Rex Donat - the fourteenth Anglican Bishop of Mauritius

== See also ==
- List of secondary schools in Mauritius
- Education in Mauritius
