= Trevor Huddleston =

British Anglican priest (1913–1998)

The Most Reverend Trevor Huddleston CR KCMG
- Archbishop of the Indian Ocean
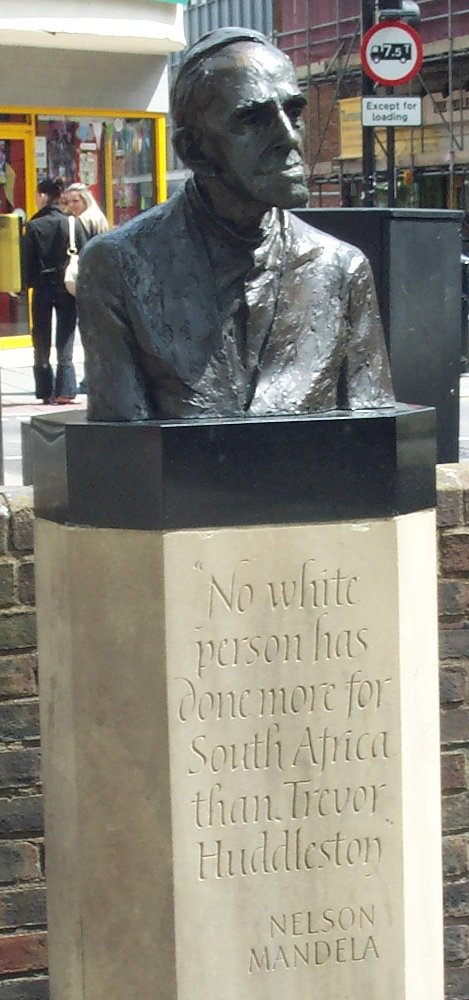
- Trevor Huddleston bust in Bedford, England
- Province: Province of the Indian Ocean
- Diocese: Mauritius
- Installed: 1978
- Term ended: 1983
- Predecessor: Edwin Curtis
- Successor: French Chang-Him
- Other posts: Bishop of Masasi; Bishop of Stepney; Bishop of Mauritius; Archbishop of the Indian Ocean

Orders
- Ordination: 1936 (deacon); 1937 (priest)
- Consecration: 1960

Personal details
- Born: 15 June 1913 Bedford, England
- Died: 20 April 1998 (aged 84) Mirfield, England
- Education: Christ Church, Oxford

Ernest Urban Trevor Huddleston CR KCMG (15 June 1913 – 20 April 1998) was an English Anglican bishop. He was the Bishop of Stepney in London before becoming the second Archbishop of the Church of the Province of the Indian Ocean. He was best known for his anti-apartheid activism and his book Naught for Your Comfort.

== Early life ==
Huddleston was the son of Ernest Huddleston and was born in Bedford, Bedfordshire, and educated at Lancing College (1927–1931), Christ Church, Oxford, and at Wells Theological College. He joined an Anglican religious order, the Community of the Resurrection (CR), in 1939, taking vows in 1941, having already served for three years as a curate at St Mark's Swindon. He had been made a deacon at Michaelmas 1936 (27 September) and ordained a priest the following Michaelmas (26 September 1937) – both times by Clifford Woodward, Bishop of Bristol, at Bristol Cathedral.

== South Africa ==
In September 1940, Huddleston sailed to Cape Town, and in 1943 he went to the Community of the Resurrection mission station at Rosettenville (Johannesburg, South Africa). He was sent there to build on the work of Raymond Raynes, whose monumental efforts there, building three churches, seven schools and three nursery schools catering for more than 6,000 children, had proved to be so demanding that the community summoned him back to Mirfield in order to recuperate. Raynes was deeply concerned about who should be appointed to succeed him. He met Huddleston who had been appointed to nurse him while he was in the infirmary. As a result of that meeting, much to Huddleston's surprise as he had only been a member of the community for four years, Raynes was convinced that he had found his successor.

Over the course of the next 13 years in Sophiatown, Huddleston developed into a much-loved priest and respected anti-apartheid activist, earning him the nickname Makhalipile ("dauntless one"). He fought against the apartheid laws, which were increasingly systematised by the Nationalist government which was voted in by the white electorate in 1948, and in 1955 the African National Congress (ANC) bestowed the rare Isitwalandwe award of honour on him at the famous Freedom Congress in Kliptown. He was particularly concerned about the Nationalist Government's decision to bulldoze Sophiatown and forcibly remove all its inhabitants sixteen miles further away from Johannesburg. Despite Huddleston's efforts, these removals began on 9 February 1955 when Nelson Mandela described Huddleston as one of the leaders of the opposition to the removal. Among other work, he established the African Children's Feeding Scheme (which still exists today) and raised money for the Orlando Swimming Pools – the only place black children could swim in Johannesburg until post-1994.

There are many South Africans whose lives were changed by Huddleston; one of the most famous is Hugh Masekela, for whom Huddleston provided his first trumpet as a 14-year-old pupil at St. Martin's School (Rosettenville) in South Africa. Soon after the "Huddleston Jazz Band" was formed, sparking a global career for Masekela and his fellow South African, Jonas Gwangwa. Other notable persons who credit Huddleston with influencing their lives include Archbishop Desmond Tutu, Sally Motlana (activist and vice-chair of the South African Council of Churches during the 1970s), Archbishop Khotso Makhulu and Robben Islander and later President of the Land Claims Court Fikile Bam. Huddleston was close to O R Tambo, ANC President during the years of exile, from 1962 to 1990. They hosted many conferences, protests and actions together, in the face of fierce opposition from both Margaret Thatcher and the South African government and their allies.

== Return to England, Tanzania and Mauritius ==
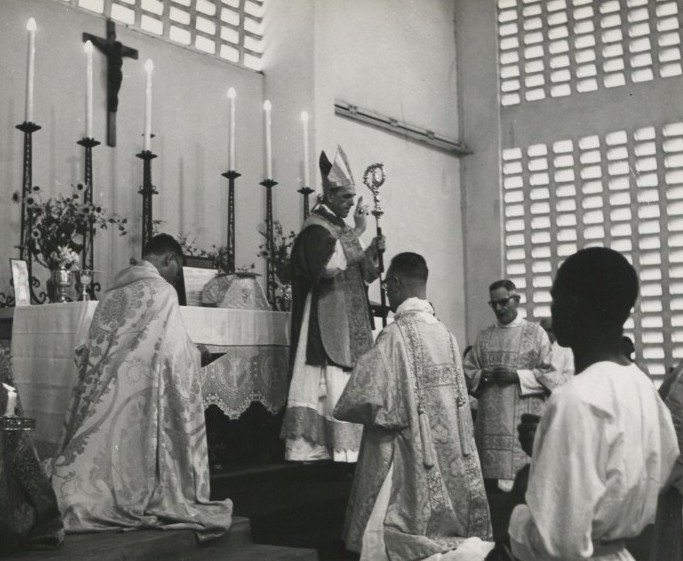
Huddleston during his consecration service in 1960

Huddleston's community asked him to return to England in 1955 (and he left South Africa in early 1956). Patrick Stewart, the future acclaimed actor, was junior reporter for a local Yorkshire newspaper and spotted Huddleston while visiting the House of the Resurrection in Mirfield.

Some say owing to the controversy he was attracting in speaking out against apartheid. However, the Superior at the time, Raymond Raynes, wrote that the decision to recall Trevor was made by Raynes himself. In 1956, he published his seminal work, Naught for your Comfort, and began work as the master of novices at CR's Mirfield mother house in West Yorkshire for two years before becoming the prior of the order's priory in London where he remained until his appointment as a bishop. He was consecrated a bishop on St Andrew's Day 1960 (30 November) by Leonard Beecher, Archbishop of East Africa, at St Nicholas', Ilala, Dar es Salaam, to serve as Bishop of Masasi (Tanzania), where he worked for eight years, primarily in re-organising the mission schools to be run by the newly independent government of Julius Nyerere, with whom he became a firm friend. He became Bishop of Stepney, a suffragan bishop in the Diocese of London.

In 1974, Huddleston was questioned by the police in connection with complaints of alleged sexual impropriety made by the parents of four boys who had been playing in Huddleston's office. In his statement, Huddleston said: "I have never done anything to harm a child... The boys are telling the truth but the implications of indecency are completely absurd." The police report recommended charging him with four counts of gross indecency, but because of his high profile, the matter was referred to the director of public prosecutions, Sir Norman Skelhorn. Skelhorn decided not to charge him after consulting Labour party figures. According to some sources, the existence of the investigation and report was uncovered only as part of research for the 2004 publication of Piers McGrandle's biography (see below). However, there was no reason for the report to be public, if the case for prosecution had been dismissed.

In his biography, Trevor Huddleston: Turbulent Priest, Piers McGrandle quotes Archbishop Desmond Tutu and Bishop Gerald Ellison dismissing the claims as a plot by the South African Bureau of State Security (B.O.S.S.) to discredit a prominent opponent of apartheid. Tutu wrote the foreword for the McGrandle book, and Archbishop Rowan Williams the afterword. McGrandle was a part-time chaplain to Huddleston, and wanted to introduce Huddleston to a new generation. At a service to mark the Centenary of Huddleston's birth in June 2013, many people testified to the impact Huddleston had made on their faith and practice as Anglicans, and others, as activists.

Tutu, who as a little boy knew Huddleston and swears to his innocence, was particularly affronted by the suggestion that Huddleston was anything other than a protector of children. On 14 February 1995, he wrote a lengthy letter saying any suggestion of Huddleston's criminality was outrageous.

On 14 February 1995, Desmond Tutu, the then Archbishop of Cape Town, wrote: "He [Huddleston] was an enormous thorn in the side of the apartheid regime and was effectively the real spokesman for the anti-apartheid movement for a considerable period. No one did more to keep apartheid on the world's agenda than he and therefore it would have been a devastating victory for the forces of evil and darkness had he been discredited", adding "How ghastly to want to besmirch such a remarkable man, so holy and so good. How utterly despicable and awful."

Bishop Gerald Ellison, the Bishop of London when Huddleston was Bishop of Stepney, also said that political enemies of Huddleston were involved.

Ellison said: "I want to make it absolutely clear that I have seen no evidence that Bishop Trevor was ever guilty of a criminal act. He undoubtedly had many enemies in South Africa and England who wanted to denigrate him, indeed, to destroy him." Ellison was also clear that neither he, nor his legal advisers, believed anyone had the right to impede justice if there was any real evidence of guilt. However, Sam Silkin, the Attorney General at the time who had taken the decision not to prosecute, later said on the radio:

"I found that I was in difficulty as the man was very well known. If he had been prosecuted at all, it would have ruined his career. Within the DPP's department, everyone thought he would be acquitted, though there was clearly evidence."

After ten years in England, Huddleston was appointed in 1978 as the Bishop of Mauritius, a diocese of the Province of the Indian Ocean. Later in the same year, he was elected as the Archbishop of the Province of the Indian Ocean. In 1984, he was succeeded by Rex Donat as Bishop of Mauritius.

== After retirement ==
After his retirement from episcopal office in 1983, Huddleston continued anti-apartheid work, having become president of the Anti-Apartheid Movement in 1981. He continued to campaign against the imprisonment of children in South Africa, and was able to vote as an honorary South African in the first democratic elections on 27 April 1994. He briefly returned to South Africa but found it too difficult with his diabetic condition and increasing frailty, and returned to Mirfield. In October 1994, he was involved in the establishment of the Living South Africa Memorial, the UK's memorial to all those who lost lives under political violence, at St Martin-in-the-Fields church, London, which raised funds for education in the newly democratic South Africa, and campaigned for ongoing investment in the region, under a call to action, "It takes more than a vote to get over apartheid".

In 1994, he received honours from Tanzania (Torch of Kilimanjaro) and was awarded the Indira Gandhi Award for Peace, Disarmament and Development. In the 1998 New Year Honours, he was appointed Knight Commander of the Order of St Michael and St George (KCMG).

In 1994, Huddleston was awarded an honorary Doctor of Humane Letters (LHD) degree from Whittier College.

== Death and legacy ==
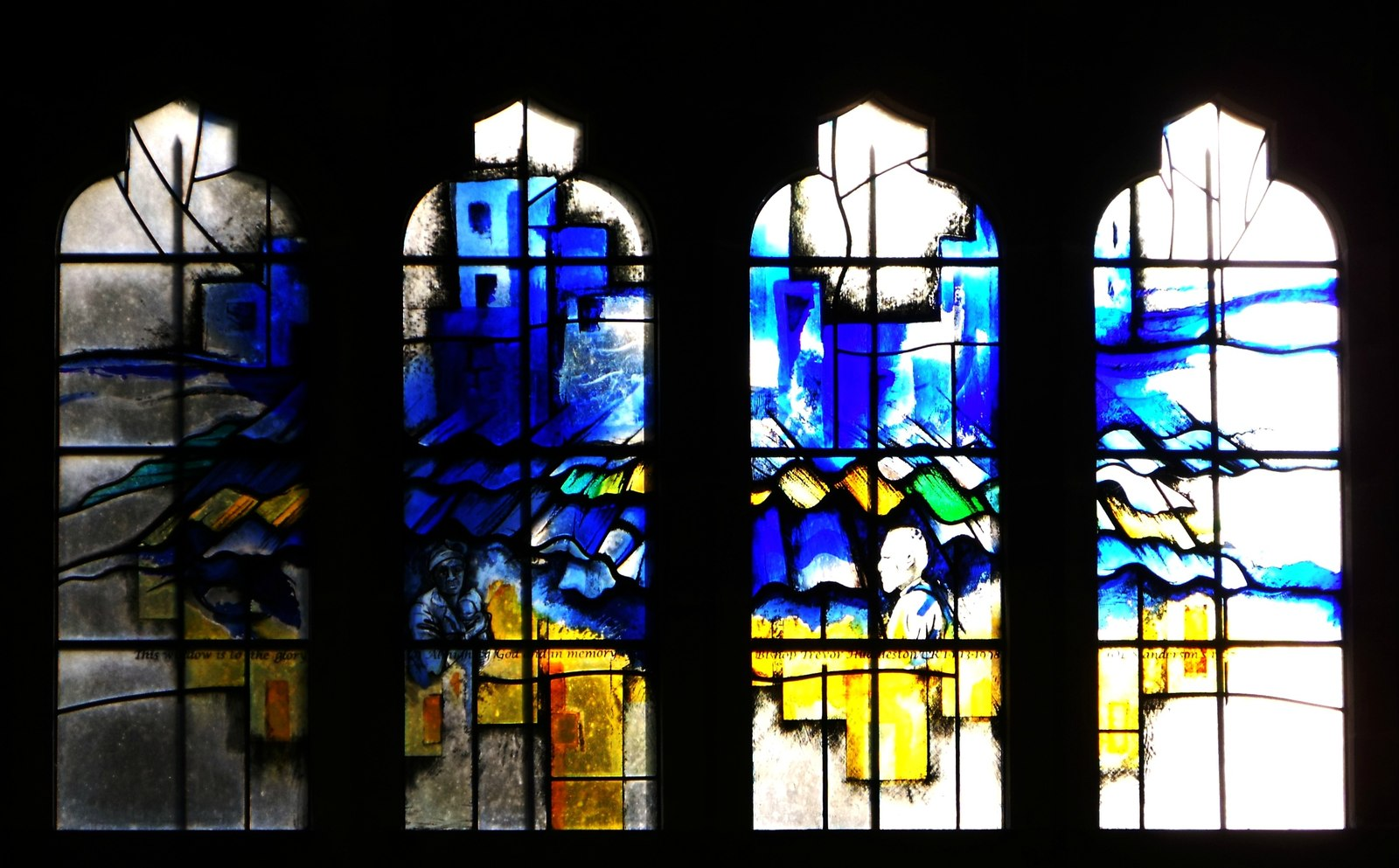
Stained glass window memorial to Huddleston in Lancing Chapel

Huddleston died at Mirfield, West Yorkshire, England, in 1998. A window in memory of him is in Lancing College chapel and was visited by Desmond Tutu. They had become friends when Huddleston visited a young Tutu in hospital when he was ill with TB. They later worked together opposing apartheid. The Huddleston Centre in Hackney has been delivering youth provision to disabled young people living in Hackney for more than 30 years, and continues to do so. The centre bears Huddleston's name after he intervened to ensure that part of a church building was converted to provide an accessible nursery, play (and latterly youth club) space for disabled young people in Hackney, regardless of their faith. The Trevor Huddleston Memorial Centre in Sophiatown was established in 1999 following Huddleston's death and the interment of his ashes in the garden of Christ the King Church in Sophiatown where he had been active and then supervised mission activity for 13 years. The Centre delivers youth development programmes in Johannesburg as well as heritage and cultural projects promoting Huddleston's belief in developing the potential of every young person and his commitment to non-racialism, multi-faith issues and social justice.

In addition, Huddleston also bought the first trumpet of Hugh Masekela, a South African trumpeter, composer and singer, and got Louis Armstrong to give Masekela one of his own trumpets as a gift. Aged 21, Masekela left South Africa for the UK where Huddleston helped him secure a place at the Guildhall School of Music, and then he went to New York, where he began to craft his signature Afro-jazz style, under both Armstrong and Gillespie. Masekela was joined at the event by special guest and New York-born jazz pianist, Larry Willis, whom Masekela first met in those early days in Manhattan. Masekela later gave the Fr Huddleston Memorial Lecture at a special event in central London to mark the end of Huddleston's Centenary Year (June 2013-June 2014), and the 20th anniversary of democratic elections.

Hosted by the Trevor Huddleston Memorial Centre (based in Sophiatown, Johannesburg), the Gala Evening raised funds for the work of the Memorial Centre, to help young entrepreneurs get a foothold in the creative industries in South Africa. The Memorial Centre runs training and incubation for entrepreneurs, and awards the Fr Huddleston Arts Bursary to one young South African annually, giving them experience in a UK community arts setting for 3–6 months. In this way, the legacy of Huddleston in assisting young people is continued.

== Writings ==
=== Books ===
Huddleston wrote five books, the seminal two being:

- Naught For Your Comfort. Fontana Books. 1960. ISBN 9780006269571.
- Return to South Africa: The Ecstasy and the Agony. W. B. Eerdmans. 1992. ISBN 978-0-86543-349-6.

=== Prayer for Africa ===
A well-known prayer of Huddleston's is the "Prayer for Africa". It has been recited throughout South Africa, Tanzania and other African countries.

God bless Africa,
Guard her people,
Guide her leaders,
And give her peace.

Alternative version (with emphasis on children):

God Bless Africa,
Guard her children,
Guide her leaders,
And give her peace, for Jesus Christ's sake. Amen.

Another alternative version:

God bless Africa, God bless Africa,
Guard her children, guide her leaders.
God bless Africa, God bless Africa,
God bless Africa and bring her peace.

Anglican parishes in South Africa now routinely say the original prayer, or a variation thereof near the end of their regular services. A slightly different variation is used every week.

Barry Smith who served as Director of Music at the St George's Cathedral in Cape Town, composed a musical accompaniment for the version that emphasizes children. See a recording at https://www.youtube.com/watch?v=ou_dlJGR0Pg

== See also ==
- Graham Chadwick

== Notes and references ==
- Mandela, Nelson (1994). Long Walk to Freedom. ABACUS. ISBN 9780349106533.
- Meredith, Martin (1 April 2010). Mandela: A Biography. Simon and Schuster. p. 95. ISBN 978-1-84739-933-5.
- Stewart, Dorothy M. (1999). The Westminster Collection of Christian Prayers. Westminster John Knox Press. ISBN 978-0-664-22945-0.
- Wilkinson, Alan (1992). The Community of the Resurrection: A Centenary History. SCM. ISBN 978-0-334-02526-9.

Anglican Communion titles
Preceded by Mark Way	Bishop of Masasi; 1959–1968	Succeeded by Gayo Hilary Chisonga
Preceded by Evered Lunt	Bishop of Stepney; 1968–1978	Succeeded by Jim Thompson
Preceded by Ghislain Emmanuel	Bishop of Mauritius; 1978–1983	Succeeded by Rex Donat
Preceded by Edwin Curtis	Archbishop of the Indian Ocean; 1978–1983	Succeeded by French Chang-Him
