= Carole Ellis =

Mayor of Bedford
- In office 1999–2000
- Preceded by: Anthony Ruffin
- Succeeded by: Hazel Mitchell

Bedford Borough Council member for Great Barford Ward, Bedfordshire
- In office 1991–2012

Personal details
- Party: Conservative Party (UK)

Carole Maxwell Ellis (December 1948 – 2 December 2014) was a British politician, Mayor of Bedford, magistrate, and Conservative Bedford Borough Councillor for Great Barford Ward.

== Personal life ==
Carole Maxwell Ellis was born in December 1948.

2 December 2014, Carole passed away following a long illness.

== Political career ==
=== Council career (1991–1999) ===
Carole was first elected to Bedford Borough Council in 1991 as a representative of Great Barford Ward. Alongside her work as a councillor Carole served as a magistrate for 6 years.

In her first few years as a councillor she established the Furniture Link charitable trust which gave volunteers the opportunity to learn new skills by refurbishing furniture whilst gaining experience in the workplace. These years also saw her active in raising funds for charities such as the Heart Unit at Bedford Hospital and Willington Riding for the Disabled.

She was also a member of Great Barford Parish Council for 22 years and a Governor of Great Barford Lower School for 20 years.

On 6 May 1999, Carole was re-elected as Great Barford's Bedford Borough Councillor. She received 488 votes (69.81%) - a majority.

=== Mayoral career (1999–2000) ===
Carole became Mayor of Bedford in 1999 with her serving a full term.

Mostly famously on 7 April 2000, Nelson Mandela visited Bedford as to rededicate a statue of his friend and anti-apartheid activist, Trevor Huddleston (Bedford born). Alongside her husband, Eddie she hosted the former South African President.

During this time she also planted a tree in Russell Park to commemorate the life of Anne Frank.

=== Leader of the Bedford Borough Council's Conservative Group (2009–2012) ===
Between 2009 and 2012 Carole was the Leader of the council's Conservative Group. She was Chair of the Corporate Services Committee until 2014, also serving on the Licensing Committee. All the while still serving as the councillor of Great Barford.

== Legacy ==
In 2014, Carole was named in the London Gazette's New Years Honour List "For services to Local Government and Charity". She received an MBE.
