= Rex Donat =

Luc Rex Victor Donat GOSK (known as Rex) was the fourteenth Anglican Bishop of Mauritius, succeeding in 1984 the Most Revd. Trevor Huddleston. Earlier on, in 1967, Donat became the first Mauritian Warden of Saint Andrew's School, the only Anglican secondary school of the country. He had been a pupil of the school from 1948 to 1954 and also a member of the teaching staff of the school since 1961.

Donat was educated at Ramjas College, the University of Delhi in India, and Nashotah House, Wisconsin, USA, and ordained in 1964. He became a Freeman of Beau Bassin/Rose Hill, Mauritius. In 2005, Donat was made Grand Officer of the Order of the Star and Key of the Indian Ocean (GOSK), the second highest distinct order of merit in Mauritius, "for distinguished services to the Community."

Rex Donat, is the son of late Louis Mathieu Victor Donat, known as Victor Donat, Archdeacon of the Anglican Diocese of Mauritius. The Donat family in Mauritius has long been associated with the Anglican Church and active in the educational field. Rex Donat spent his childhood in the Port Louis suburb of Plaine Verte, by St Paul's Anglican Church, where his father Victor Donat, was the serving Minister, with church wardens Edwin Elie Donat and Oswald Sankarsingh. Bishop Rex Donat was married to Gladys Donat—born Lutchmaya, who died in 1998—and has three sons: Jean, Norbert and Bruno.
