= Ghislain Emmanuel =

Ghislain Elwyn Emmanuel (died 16 February 1977) was Bishop of Mauritius from 1976 to 1977.

He was educated at King's College London and ordained deacon in 1956 and priest in 1957.

His first post was as a Curate at Vacoas (1956-58) after which he was Priest in charge at Rodrigues (1958-60) and then a Minor Canon at St James's Cathedral Port Louis (1960-65). Later he was Principal of St Paul's Theological College, Mauritius from 1964 and then Archdeacon of Mauritius from 1972. The first native Mauritian bishop of the Diocese of Mauritius, he died after three months in office. He died in 1977, aged 48.

Anglican Communion titles
Preceded by Edwin Curtis	Bishop of Mauritius; 1976 – 1977	Succeeded by Trevor Huddleston
