= Jardin Balfour (Mauritius) =

Recreational Park in Mauritius

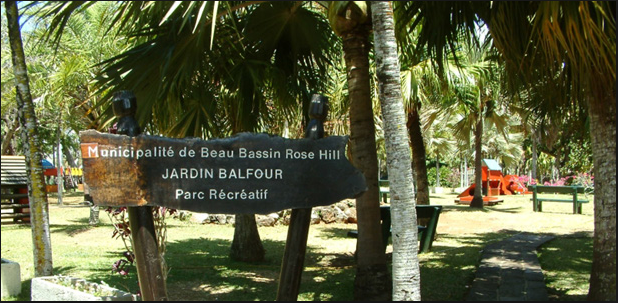
Jardin Balfour

The Jardin Balfour is a recreational park, where people exercise, watch tortoises in the tortoise park, or find a peaceful moment. Children come to play in the area provided for them. It is located in the beautiful Beau Bassin.

== Renovation ==
In October 2016, Jardin Balfour had after a very long time undergone renovation work and upgrading to maintain its exotic beauty. Speakers have also been put in place for visitors, at what is called the Peace Corner
