= Henry Burridge =

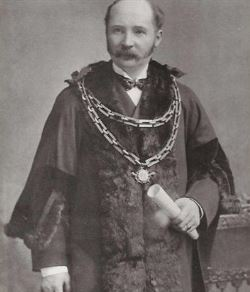

Mayor of Bedford
- In office 1900–1901
- Preceded by: Hedley Baxter
- Succeeded by: Geoffrey Howard
- In office 1904–1905
- Preceded by: Edward Lavender Moulton
- Succeeded by: George Haynes

Henry Burridge (3/4 December 1856 – July 1932) was a two-time Mayor of Bedford, Alderman, Bedford Borough Councillor, and Justice of the Peace.

== Personal life ==
Henry Burridge was born in Bedford on 3rd/4th December 1856. He was the second son of parents James & Hannah Hoe. He was baptised alongside his two siblings (Alfred and Clara Jane) on the 7 October 1860 at St. Mary's Church, Bedford.

He was educated at Riley's School (now known as 'Bedford School').

In 1876, Henry Burridge married Miss Pearcy Elson of Finedon. They have 5 children.

In 1885, he described himself as a plumber, glazier, gas fitter, whitesmith, and general smith.

By 1899, Henry still resided at 41 Cauldwell St, Bedford and was still occupied as a builder. During this time, Henry also described himself as a "private resident" all the while still the owner of the local brickworks.

At one point Henry applied for a patent for "improvements in motor vehicles and the like" for a type of amphibious car, describing himself as an "engineer".

His oldest son Walter passed away in 1920, followed by his youngest son, Cecil, February 1921, and his wife in April 1921.

In 1922, Henry alongside his son-in-law acquired shares in the Bedford Chemical Co. Ltd. as well as Bedford Club and Bowling Green Co. In 1928, twelve shares in local enterprises, the De Parys Club and Bowling Green Company were transferred from Hedley Baxter to Henry.

== Political career ==
Henry stood as a candidate for Bedford's Western Ward in 1888, with his fellow campaigners William Cameron and Edwin Ransom addressing the Burgesses of the Western Ward, offering themselves as candidates with "a constant aim to prevent unnecessary expenditure and to keep the rates as low as possible". This address was printed by Edwin Ransom. From 1888, Burridge was a member of the Bedford Town Council, and remained so for 30 years.

In 1896, Henry Burridge was elected as Bedford's Eastern Ward's representative on the Bedford Borough Council. This time he addressed the Burgesses of the Eastern Ward, soliciting votes and setting out in detail his records as a town councillor over the past 6 years and the rates. This address was then printed by the Bedford Publishing Company.

He was first made Mayor in 1900.

In 1902, to coincide with King Edward VII's coronation, he hosted local festivities as mayor.

By 1903, he was serving as an Alderman of the town, presiding to elections in Bedford's Western Ward. As Alderman in 1904, he contributed £20 to the establishment of the Goldington Reading and Recreation Rooms.

He was again made Mayor of Bedford in 1904.

In December 1904, Henry hosted the 'Grand Shakespearian Bazaar' which was opened by Princess Christian and Lady French.

Utilising his experience as a builder, in September 1914 Burridge published a technical paper, "Economical Supply of Hot Water to Artisans' Dwellings," in which he described a low-cost, fuel-efficient hot-water system suitable for smaller artisan houses. Burridge noted that he had recently erected twelve seven-roomed houses equipped with the system, being able to offer rents of 6 shillings per week.

In the 1918 general election, Burridge stood as an Independent Coalition candidate for the Borough of Bedford. In his published election address on 29 November 1918, he emphasised the need for the 'full restoration of civil liberties', arguing that they had been "willingly surrendered" by the public during the First World War under the Defence of the Realm Act (1914).

== Death ==
Burridge died in 1932, at age 76.
