= Collège de La Confiance =

College in Mauritius

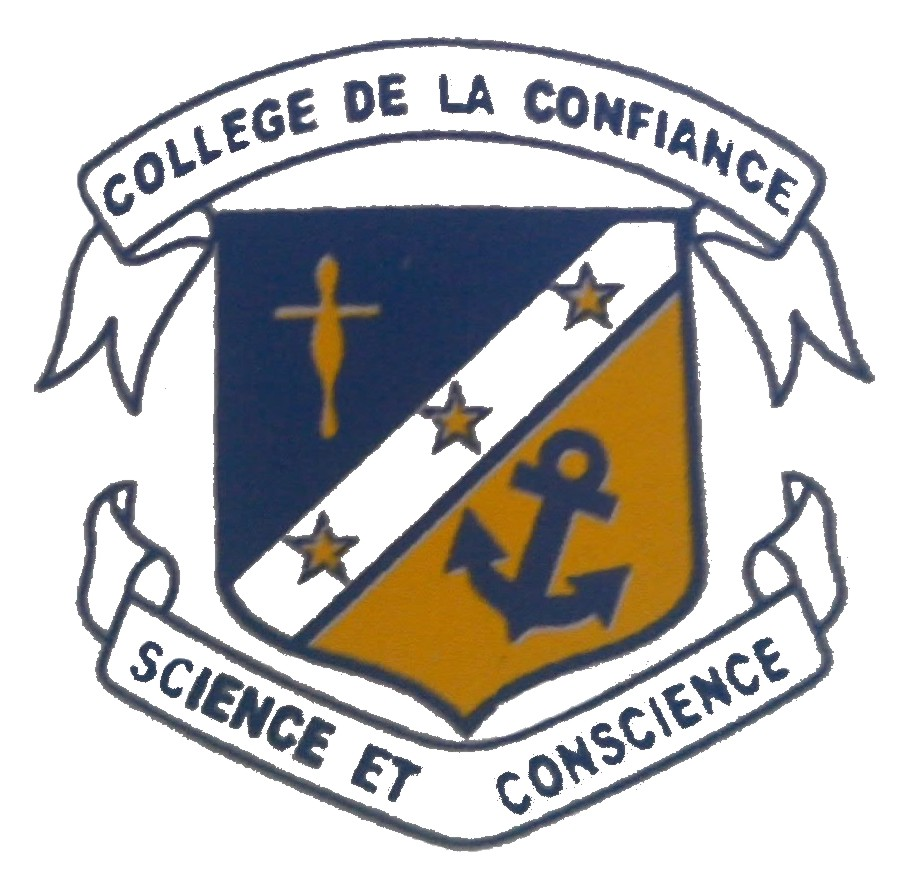
- College de La Confiance
- Motto: Science et Conscience
- Established: 1970
- Location: Commerson St/Dr. Reid Street, Colonel Maingard, Beau Bassin-Rose Hill, Plaines Wilhems, Mauritius; 20.2198°S 57.4616°E
- Colours: Blue and gold
- Website: laconfiance.e-monsite.com

Collège de La Confiance is a confessional college located in Beau-Bassin, Mauritius.
