= Municipal Council of Beau Bassin-Rose Hill =

Coordinates: 20.239809°S 57.471703°E

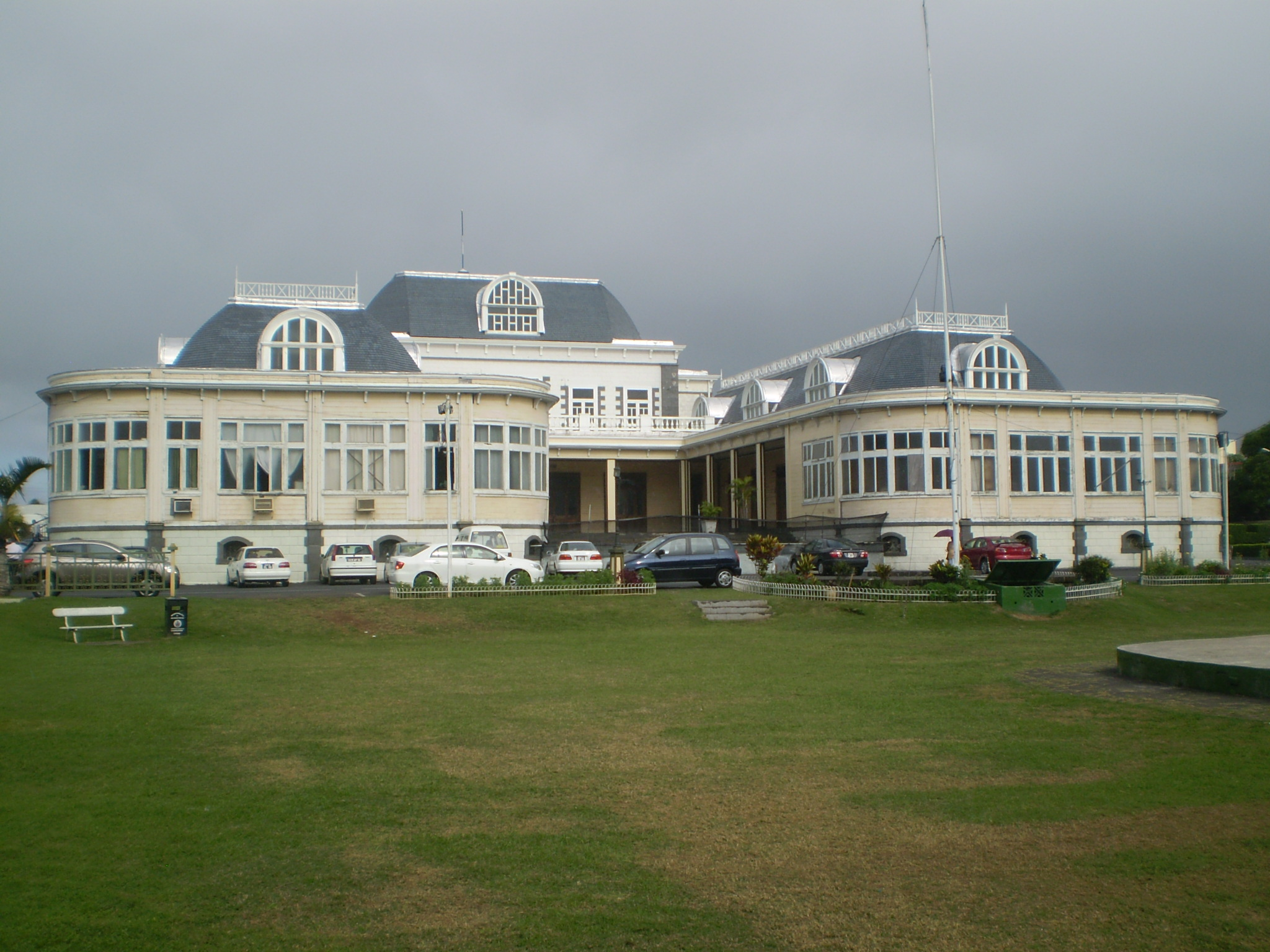
The Municipal Council of Beau-Bassin Rose-Hill

The Municipal Council of Beau-Bassin Rose-Hill (French: Conseil Municipal de Beau-Bassin Rose-Hill) is the local authority responsible for the administration of the town of Beau-Bassin Rose-Hill, Plaines Wilhems District, Mauritius. Since 28 August 2024, the mayor is Jean Didier David Utile and the deputy mayor is Nazir Mohamed Ameen Junggee.

The council comprises several departments, including administration, finance, public health, library, land use and planning, and welfare. Residents can file complaints, suggest solutions, and apply for land and building permits, among other services, through the council.
