= Henry Buswell =

Henry Dison Buswell (1839–1940) was a long lived Anglican Archdeacon.

Hobbs was educated at the Church Missionary Society College, Islington and ordained deacon in 1862 and priest in 1863. He served in Ceylon, Mauritius, Réunion and the Seychelles, where he was Archdeacon from 1895 to 1913. While in Mauritius, he was responsible for the establishment of St Paul's Theological College.

He died on 17 March 1940 aged 101.
