= Hedley Baxter =

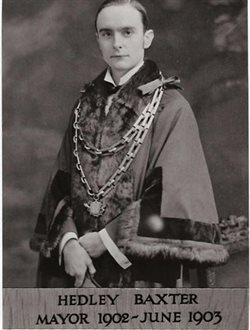

Mayor of Bedford
- In office 9 November 1899 – 9 November 1900
- Preceded by: George Wells
- Succeeded by: Henry Burridge
- In office 9 November 1903 – 28 May 1903
- Preceded by: Geoffrey Howard
- Succeeded by: George Royle

Bedford Borough Council member for Division No. 5
- In office 1989–1915

Personal details
- Party: Conservative Party (UK)

Hedley Baxter (1869 – 22 March 1918) was a two-time Mayor of Bedford, England.

== Personal life ==
Hedley Baxter was born in 1869 to parents John and Mary Ann. He was baptised on 10 August 1870 at Bedford Methodist (Wesleyan) Circuit.

He married Mary Lister Haigh in 1892.

Electoral registers give his address as 37 Ashburnham Road, then as Leverington, Kimbolton Road. By 1915, he had moved to Worthing, Sussex, for the sake of his health, but he was still qualified to vote in Bedford through ownership of 78 Kimbolton Road - which he acquired on 11 May 1890. He died on 22 March 1918 aged 39; his occupation was given as solicitor.

=== After death (post 1918) ===
Ownership of 78 Kimbolton Road passed to his son John.

In 1928, Baxter's held twelve shares in local enterprises, the De Parys Club and Bowling Green Company were transferred to Henry Burridge.

== Political career ==
=== Early career (1891–1899) ===
In 1891, Hedley was working as a solicitor based in Luton. He would keep this job until his death in 1918.

He was elected a member of the Bedford Borough Council in 1899, representing Bedford Division No. 5 (likely Ampthill due to house address).

=== First mayoral term (1899–1900) ===
He first served as Mayor in 1899, elected as a Conservative, being sworn in on 9 November 1899.

In June 1900, Hedley opened a new Recreation Club in Woburn Sands. 8 June 1900 he chaired the ceremony of Prizes for Trinity College London (Music) at The Bedford Centre Presentation of Certificates, awarding music students for their achievements.

=== Second mayoral term (1902–1903) ===
He again served as Mayor in 1902, being sworn in on 9 November 1902.

In December 1902, Baxter undertook alterations to his property at 2, 4 & 5 Windsor Place, Bedford, commissioning plans for a new shop front and structural modifications, including girder and drainage works.

Baxter established the Soldiers’ Memorial in Bedford, commemorating local men who died in the Second Boar War. He initially planned to purchase the site for the memorial, but when the land was offered by the owner, Mr. Benison, on condition that legal fees were covered, Baxter personally paid these costs, ensuring the town incurred no expense. The monument, funded by public subscription to the value of £1,062 16s 8d, features a large bronze infantry soldier and panels inscribed with the names of Bedfordshire soldiers who fell during the campaign.

He resigned as Mayor on 28 May 1903 when he was elected as Town Clerk.

=== Town Clerk (1903–1910) ===
His term of office as Bedford Borough Councillor ended in March 1904.

He served as Town Clerk following his resignation as Mayor 28 May 1903.

On 7 July 1905, he wrote to Laurence Read Colburne Higgins regarding the historical identity of land at Biddenham, which had been altered in 1622 with an annuity of 20 shillings per year. On 10 July 1905 he explains to Higgins that "several hours have been spent searching for the identity of the land at Biddenham" and "without avail".

During this time he was also a Justice of the Peace for the Borough.

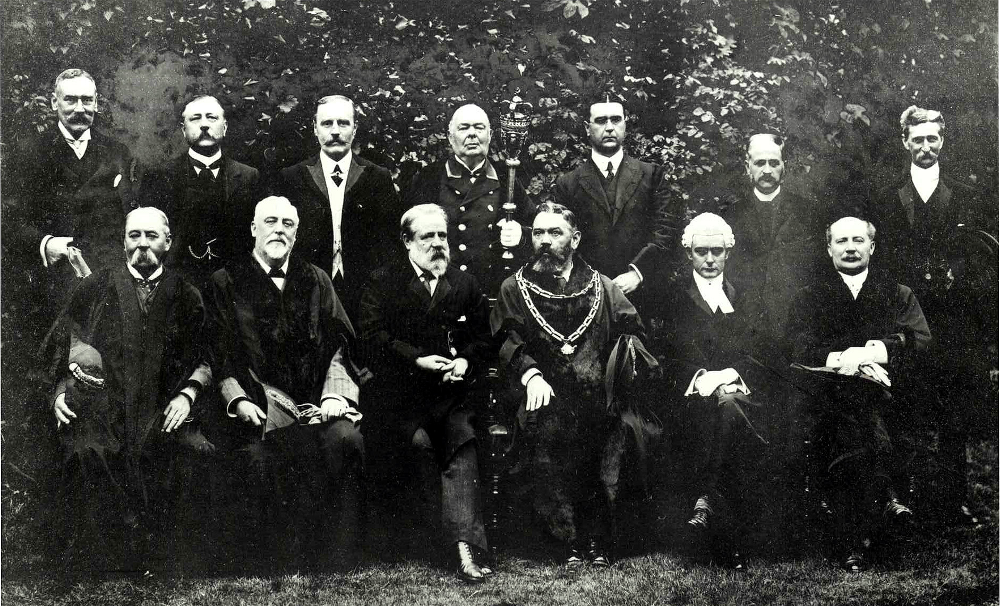
King Edward VII's visit to Wrest Park (1909). Hedley Baxter (front row, second last)

In July 1909, King Edward VII visited Wrest Park in Silsoe, Bedfordshire, as the guest of U.S. Ambassador Whitelaw Reid. The visit marked the first time a reigning monarch stayed at Wrest Park. Extensive preparations were made, including the decoration of the village, arrangements for local schoolchildren and scouts, and the organization of local gentry and officials to greet the King. Hedley Baxter, serving as the Town Clerk of Bedford, accompanied a deputation from the Bedford Corporation to present a formal loyal address to the monarch. The King engaged with local residents, inspected the church, and attended a tea reception.

Hedley resigned in 1910 as Town Clerk, being forced to quit due to worsening ill health.
