= Sir William Long =

English brewer

Sir William Long (1756–1841) was an English brewer, landowner and four-time Mayor of Bedford in Bedfordshire.

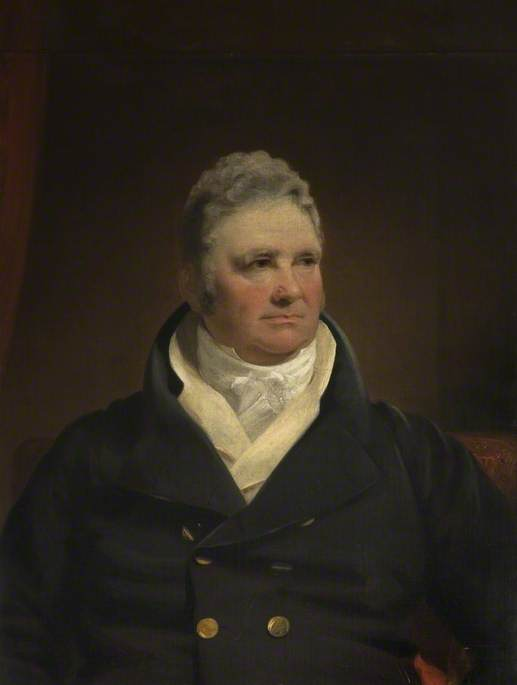
Sir William Long (c.1830)

== Biography ==
William Long was born in 1756.

By 1783, Long had entered the brewing trade. In that year he went into business with brothers, Henry and James Whittingstall, leasing a new brewery at Bedford’s St Paul’s Square.

Outside Bedford town, Sir William Long was a major landowner. He resided at Kempston Bury (also known as the Manor of Kempston Hastingsbury), which he acquired in 1801 from the heirs of John Kendall Cater. As Lord of the Manor of Kempston, he rebuilt Kempston House on a late-17th century core and laid out estate lands nearby. He also owned Bedford Lodge in Bedford and further farms and property in Kempston and Ravensden. In 1802 he sold the Kempston mill and some adjoining lands, but retained the rest of the estate.

In 1803, after Henry Whittingstall’s death, Long bought out James Whittingstall's stake in the brewery, giving Long ownership until his death. This same year William was elected mayor.

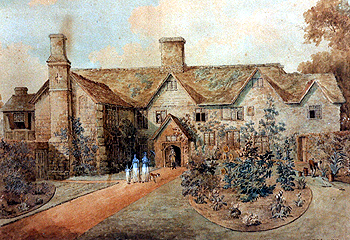
Kempston Manor in 1803

Additionally, beyond his mayoral duties, Long served as High Sheriff of Bedfordshire in 1806. He also acted as a magistrate and community leader during this period.

He achieved his second term as mayor once elected in 1813 and received his knighthood in King George III's birthday honours in 1814.

Long was re-elected mayor in 1822 and 1829. Whilst mayor in 1830 Long presided over Bedford’s first contested parliamentary election in forty years; when two candidates tied for second place, Long (as the returning officer) cast the deciding vote. Long decided against candidate Lord John Russell due to him offending the Methodist community because he voted for himself.

In the 1830s Long took in a partner, William Pestell, and traded as “Long and Pestell”. He also had his portrait painted by James Lonsdale (1777–1839).

Sir William lent money to the Improvement Commissioners to build Bedford Bridge over the River Great Ouse, but cancelled his bonds on condition that his carriage should pass free of toll, shortly after which tolls were done away with.

Upon Sir William Long’s death on 2 November 1841, his brewing business (including St Paul’s brewery and its pubs) passed to his son-in-law Robert Newland of Kempston (and later to Newland’s son Bingham), over Long's lifetime he had acquired 28 tied public houses. His will also dictated to leave money to the three daughters of his friend Robert Denis of Kempston, “who have always shewn great attention to my Daughters”. Long was buried in Kempston All Saints churchyard.
