= 2016 Badminton Asia Team Championships – Men's team event =

Men's team at the 2016 Badminton Asia Team Championships
- Venue: GMC Balayogi Indoor Stadium
- Location: Hyderabad, India
- Dates: 15–21 February 2016
- Nations: 14

Medalists
gold medal	Indonesia
silver medal	Japan
bronze medal	India
bronze medal	South Korea

The men's team event at the 2016 Badminton Asia Team Championships took place from 15 to 21 February at the GMC Balayogi Indoor Stadium in Hyderabad, India.

== Seeds ==
The seeds were announced on 21 January 2016 based on the BWF World Team Rankings.

1. South Korea (semi-finals)
2. Indonesia (champions)
3. Japan (final)
4. India (semi-finals)

== Group stage ==
The draw was held on 2 February 2016. The men's team group stages consist of 4 groups: A, B, C and D.

Group A	Group B	Group C	Group D
India (4, H); China; Singapore	Japan (3); Malaysia; Nepal; Sri Lanka	Indonesia (2); Maldives; Chinese Taipei; Thailand	South Korea (1); Hong Kong; Philippines

All times are Indian Standard Time (UTC+05:30).

=== Group A ===
Pos	Team	Pld	W	L	MF	MA	MD	GF	GA	GD	PF	PA	PD	Pts	Qualification
1	India	2	2	0	8	2	+6	16	6	+10	423	353	+70	2	Knockout stage
2	China	2	1	1	5	5	0	12	11	+1	417	405	+12	1	Knockout stage
3	Singapore	2	0	2	2	8	−6	6	17	−11	361	443	−82	0	

Source: TS

==== China vs Singapore ====
China
3
GMC Balayogi Indoor Stadium, Court 3
15 February 2016 11:30

Singapore
2

			1	2	3
1	(China) (Singapore)	Tian Houwei; Derek Wong	21; 11	21; 12
2	(China) (Singapore)	Liu Xiaolong / Qiu Zihan; Terry Hee / Loh Kean Hean	21; 16	13; 21	11; 21
3	(China) (Singapore)	Wang Zhengming; Loh Kean Yew	15; 21	16; 21
4	(China) (Singapore)	Li Junhui / Liu Yuchen; Danny Bawa Chrisnanta / Hendra Wijaya	21; 18	21; 14
5	(China) (Singapore)	Qiao Bin; Ryan Ng	21; 15	19; 21	21; 13

==== India vs Singapore ====
India
5
GMC Balayogi Indoor Stadium, Court 2
17 February 2016 11:30

Singapore
0

			1	2	3
1	(India) (Singapore)	Srikanth Kidambi; Derek Wong	21; 16	12; 21	21; 13
2	(India) (Singapore)	Manu Attri / B. Sumeeth Reddy; Terry Hee / Loh Kean Hean	21; 15	21; 14
3	(India) (Singapore)	Ajay Jayaram; Loh Kean Yew	21; 11	21; 18
4	(India) (Singapore)	Pranav Chopra / Akshay Dewalkar; Danny Bawa Chrisnanta / Hendra Wijaya	21; 14	21; 13
5	(India) (Singapore)	Prannoy H. S. Ryan Ng	21; 10	21; 12

==== China vs India ====
China
2
GMC Balayogi Indoor Stadium, Court 1
18 February 2016 11:30

India
3

			1	2	3
1	(China) (India)	Tian Houwei; Srikanth Kidambi	11; 21	17; 21
2	(China) (India)	Li Junhui / Liu Yuchen; Manu Attri / B. Sumeeth Reddy	22; 20	21; 11
3	(China) (India)	Wang Zhengming; Ajay Jayaram	20; 22	21; 15	18; 21
4	(China) (India)	Wang Yilyu / Zhang Wen; Pranav Chopra / Akshay Dewalkar	21; 10	21; 18
5	(China) (India)	Shi Yuqi; Prannoy H. S.	14; 21	10; 21

=== Group B ===
Pos	Team	Pld	W	L	MF	MA	MD	GF	GA	GD	PF	PA	PD	Pts	Qualification
1	Japan	3	3	0	14	1	+13	29	3	+26	655	395	+260	3	Knockout stage
2	Malaysia	3	2	1	10	5	+5	21	11	+10	594	434	+160	2	Knockout stage
3	Sri Lanka	3	1	2	6	9	−3	12	19	−7	460	563	−103	1	
4	Nepal	3	0	3	0	15	−15	1	30	−29	332	649	−317	0	

Source: TS

==== Malaysia vs Sri Lanka ====
Malaysia
4
GMC Balayogi Indoor Stadium, Court 2
16 February 2016 11:30

Sri Lanka
1

			1	2	3
1	(Malaysia) (Sri Lanka)	Zulfadli Zulkiffli; Nimmika Thisara	21; 4	21; 6
2	(Malaysia) (Sri Lanka)	Iskandar Zulkarnain Zainuddin; Sachin Dias	21; 16	21; 18
3	(Malaysia) (Sri Lanka)	Soo Teck Zhi; Buwaneka Goonethilleka	14; 21	17; 21
4	(Malaysia) (Sri Lanka)	Low Juan Shen / Tan Kian Meng; Imesh Hasaranga / Madusha Vibhavi	21; 6	21; 12
5	(Malaysia) (Sri Lanka)	Ong Yew Sin / Teo Ee Yi; Sachin Dias / Buwaneka Goonethilleka	21; 12	21; 13

==== Japan vs Nepal ====
Japan
5
GMC Balayogi Indoor Stadium, Court 4
16 February 2016 11:30

Nepal
0

			1	2	3
1	(Japan) (Nepal)	Sho Sasaki; Ratnajit Tamang	21; 10	21; 17
2	(Japan) (Nepal)	Takuma Ueda; Dipesh Dhami	21; 10	21; 12
3	(Japan) (Nepal)	Kenta Nishimoto; Bikash Shrestha	21; 13	21; 16
4	(Japan) (Nepal)	Hiroyuki Saeki / Ryota Taohata; Dipesh Dhami / Ratnajit Tamang	21; 5	21; 5
5	(Japan) (Nepal)	Takeshi Kamura / Keigo Sonoda; Bikash Shrestha / Nabin Shrestha	21; 6	21; 14

==== Japan vs Sri Lanka ====
Japan
5
GMC Balayogi Indoor Stadium, Court 1
17 February 2016 11:30

Sri Lanka
0

			1	2	3
1	(Japan) (Sri Lanka)	Kento Momota; Nimmika Thisara	21; 9	21; 8
2	(Japan) (Sri Lanka)	Sho Sasaki; Sachin Dias	21; 16	21; 12
3	(Japan) (Sri Lanka)	Kenta Nishimoto; Buwaneka Goonethilleka	21; 12	21; 12
4	(Japan) (Sri Lanka)	Takeshi Kamura / Keigo Sonoda; Pramoddya Heshan Ranaweera / Thisal Yatawara	21; 7	21; 6
5	(Japan) (Sri Lanka)	Hiroyuki Endo / Kenichi Hayakawa; Sachin Dias / Buwaneka Goonethilleka	21; 12	21; 8

==== Malaysia vs Nepal ====
Malaysia
5
GMC Balayogi Indoor Stadium, Court 3
17 February 2016 11:30

Nepal
0

			1	2	3
1	(Malaysia) (Nepal)	Zulfadli Zulkiffli; Sajan Krishna Tamrakar	21; 5	21; 5
2	(Malaysia) (Nepal)	Iskandar Zulkarnain Zainuddin; Bishnu Katwal	21; 3	21; 4
3	(Malaysia) (Nepal)	Soong Joo Ven; Nabin Shrestha	21; 9	21; 12
4	(Malaysia) (Nepal)	Low Juan Shen / Tan Kian Meng; Bishny Katwal / Bikash Shrestha	21; 8	21; 6
5	(Malaysia) (Nepal)	Tan Chee Tean / Tan Wee Gieen; Sudeep Sedhai / Sajan Krishna Tamrakar	21; 6	21; 12

==== Sri Lanka vs Nepal ====
Sri Lanka
5
GMC Balayogi Indoor Stadium, Court 4
18 February 2016 16:30

Nepal
0

			1	2	3
1	(Sri Lanka) (Nepal)	Sachin Dias; Ratnajit Tamang	21; 16	21; 17
2	(Sri Lanka) (Nepal)	Buwaneka Goonethilleka; Dipesh Dhami	21; 11	21; 9
3	(Sri Lanka) (Nepal)	Madusha Vibhavi; Bikash Shrestha	21; 14	21; 15
4	(Sri Lanka) (Nepal)	Sachin Dias / Buwaneka Goonethilleka; Dipesh Dhami / Ratnajit Tamang	21; 12	19; 21	21; 16
5	(Sri Lanka) (Nepal)	Imesh Hasaranga / Madusha Vibhavi; Bikash Shrestha / Nabin Shrestha	21; 14	21; 9

==== Japan vs Malaysia ====
Japan
4
GMC Balayogi Indoor Stadium, Court 3
18 February 2016 16:30

Malaysia
1

			1	2	3
1	(Japan) (Malaysia)	Kento Momota; Zulfadli Zulkiffli	21; 10	21; 11
2	(Japan) (Malaysia)	Hiroyuki Endo / Kenichi Hayakawa; Tan Wee Gieen / Teo Ee Yi	21; 13	21; 16
3	(Japan) (Malaysia)	Takuma Ueda; Iskandar Zulkarnain Zainuddin	21; 17	14; 21	17; 21
4	(Japan) (Malaysia)	Takeshi Kamura / Keigo Sonoda; Low Juan Shen / Tan Kian Meng	21; 10	15; 21	21; 8
5	(Japan) (Malaysia)	Kenta Nishimoto; Soong Joo Ven	21; 18	21; 19

=== Group C ===
Pos	Team	Pld	W	L	MF	MA	MD	GF	GA	GD	PF	PA	PD	Pts	Qualification
1	Indonesia	3	3	0	12	3	+9	25	10	+15	685	506	+179	3	Knockout stage
2	Chinese Taipei	3	2	1	11	4	+7	24	9	+15	645	504	+141	2	Knockout stage
3	Thailand	3	1	2	7	8	−1	18	18	0	660	549	+111	1	
4	Maldives	3	0	3	0	15	−15	0	30	−30	199	630	−431	0	

Source: TS

==== Indonesia vs Maldives ====
Indonesia
5
GMC Balayogi Indoor Stadium, Court 2
15 February 2016 16:30

Maldives
0

			1	2	3
1	(Indonesia) (Maldives)	Tommy Sugiarto; Mohamed Ajfan Rasheed	21; 2	21; 6
2	(Indonesia) (Maldives)	Ihsan Maulana Mustofa; Hussein Zayan Shaheed	21; 2	21; 8
3	(Indonesia) (Maldives)	Anthony Sinisuka Ginting; Rifau Hussain	21; 4	21; 2
4	(Indonesia) (Maldives)	Mohammad Ahsan / Hendra Setiawan; Thoif Ahmed Mohamed / Hussein Zayan Shaheed	21; 8	21; 15
5	(Indonesia) (Maldives)	Angga Pratama / Ricky Karanda Suwardi; Waseem Ahmed / Rifau Hussain	21; 4	21; 5

==== Chinese Taipei vs Thailand ====
Chinese Taipei
4
GMC Balayogi Indoor Stadium, Court 3
15 February 2016 16:30

Thailand
1

			1	2	3
1	(Chinese Taipei) (Thailand)	Chou Tien-chen; Boonsak Ponsana	21; 15	21; 7
2	(Chinese Taipei) (Thailand)	Lee Sheng-mu / Tsai Chia-hsin; Bodin Isara / Nipitphon Phuangphuapet	13; 21	21; 14	21; 19
3	(Chinese Taipei) (Thailand)	Hsu Jen-hao; Tanongsak Saensomboonsuk	21; 19	21; 18
4	(Chinese Taipei) (Thailand)	Chen Hung-ling / Wang Chi-lin; Dechapol Puavaranukroh / Kittinupong Kedren	21; 16	12; 21	16; 21
5	(Chinese Taipei) (Thailand)	Wang Tzu-wei; Khosit Phetpradab	21; 15	21; 19

==== Chinese Taipei vs Maldives ====
Chinese Taipei
5
GMC Balayogi Indoor Stadium, Court 1
16 February 2016 16:30

Maldives
0

			1	2	3
1	(Chinese Taipei) (Maldives)	Chou Tien-chen; Mohamed Ajfan Rasheed	21; 13	21; 8
2	(Chinese Taipei) (Maldives)	Hsu Jen-hao; Hussein Zayan Shaheed	21; 9	21; 13
3	(Chinese Taipei) (Maldives)	Lin Yu-hsien; Thoif Ahmed Mohamed	21; 6	21; 9
4	(Chinese Taipei) (Maldives)	Chen Hung-ling / Wang Chi-lin; Waseem Ahmed / Rifau Hussain	21; 4	21; 7
5	(Chinese Taipei) (Maldives)	Lee Jhe-huei / Lee Yang; Thoif Ahmed Mohamed / Ali Rizmee	21; 4	21; 8

==== Indonesia vs Thailand ====
Indonesia
4
GMC Balayogi Indoor Stadium, Court 3
16 February 2016 16:30

Thailand
1

			1	2	3
1	(Indonesia) (Thailand)	Tommy Sugiarto; Boonsak Ponsana	21; 17	14; 21	21; 14
2	(Indonesia) (Thailand)	Angga Pratama / Ricky Karanda Suwardi; Bodin Isara / Nipitphon Phuangphuapet	21; 18	18; 21	21; 16
3	(Indonesia) (Thailand)	Ihsan Maulana Mustofa; Tanongsak Saensomboonsuk	10; 21	21; 13	11; 21
4	(Indonesia) (Thailand)	Berry Angriawan / Rian Agung Saputro; Dechapol Puavaranukroh / Kittinupong Kedren	21; 11	14; 21	21; 16
5	(Indonesia) (Thailand)	Anthony Sinisuka Ginting; Khosit Phetpradab	22; 20	21; 15

==== Indonesia vs Chinese Taipei ====
Indonesia
3
GMC Balayogi Indoor Stadium, Court 2
17 February 2016 16:30

Chinese Taipei
2

			1	2	3
1	(Indonesia) (Chinese Taipei)	Tommy Sugiarto; Chou Tien-chen	23; 25	16; 21
2	(Indonesia) (Chinese Taipei)	Mohammad Ahsan / Hendra Setiawan; Lee Sheng-mu / Tsai Chia-hsin	23; 21	21; 15
3	(Indonesia) (Chinese Taipei)	Anthony Sinisuka Ginting; Hsu Jen-hao	21; 9	17; 21	21; 14
4	(Indonesia) (Chinese Taipei)	Angga Pratama / Ricky Karanda Suwardi; Chen Hung-ling / Wang Chi-lin	21; 19	21; 18
5	(Indonesia) (Chinese Taipei)	Jonatan Christie; Wang Tzu-wei	16; 21	18; 21

==== Thailand vs Maldives ====
Thailand
5
GMC Balayogi Indoor Stadium, Court 4
17 February 2016 16:30

Maldives
0

			1	2	3
1	(Thailand) (Maldives)	Boonsak Ponsana; Mohamed Ajfan Rasheed	21; 10	21; 10
2	(Thailand) (Maldives)	Khosit Phetpradab; Hussein Zayan Shaheed	21; 7	21; 4
3	(Thailand) (Maldives)	Adulrach Namkul; Thoif Ahmed Mohamed	21; 3	21; 3
4	(Thailand) (Maldives)	Dechapol Puavaranukroh / Kittinupong Kedren; Rifau Hussain / Ali Rizmee	21; 6	21; 5
5	(Thailand) (Maldives)	Bodin Isara / Nipitphon Phuangphuapet; Thoif Ahmed Mohamed / Hussein Zayan Shaheed	21; 8	21; 6

=== Group D ===
Pos	Team	Pld	W	L	MF	MA	MD	GF	GA	GD	PF	PA	PD	Pts	Qualification
1	South Korea	2	2	0	8	2	+6	18	6	+12	473	309	+164	2	Knockout stage
2	Hong Kong	2	1	1	6	4	+2	13	11	+2	392	425	−33	1	Knockout stage
3	Philippines	2	0	2	1	9	−8	4	18	−14	315	446	−131	0	

Source: TS

==== South Korea vs Philippines ====
South Korea
5
GMC Balayogi Indoor Stadium, Court 1
15 February 2016 11:30

Philippines
0

			1	2	3
1	(South Korea) (Philippines)	Lee Dong-keun; Frell Keeyann Gabuelo	21; 8	21; 6
2	(South Korea) (Philippines)	Ko Sung-hyun / Shin Baek-cheol; Ronel Estanislao / Paul Jefferson Vivas	21; 13	21; 12
3	(South Korea) (Philippines)	Jeon Hyeok-jin; Mark Alcala	23; 25	21; 10	21; 6
4	(South Korea) (Philippines)	Choi Sol-gyu / Kim Jae-hwan; Peter Gabriel Magnaye / Alvin Morada	21; 12	21; 13
5	(South Korea) (Philippines)	Heo Kwang-hee; Michael Kevin Cudiamat	21; 16	21; 9

==== Hong Kong vs Philippines ====
Hong Kong
4
GMC Balayogi Indoor Stadium, Court 4
17 February 2016 11:30

Philippines
1

			1	2	3
1	(Hong Kong) (Philippines)	Hu Yun; Frell Keeyann Gabuelo	14; 21	21; 13	21; 18
2	(Hong Kong) (Philippines)	Or Chin Chung / Tang Chun Man; Ronel Estanislao / Paul Jefferson Vivas	21; 16	21; 14
3	(Hong Kong) (Philippines)	Wei Nan; Mark Alcala	21; 17	21; 19
4	(Hong Kong) (Philippines)	Chan Tsz Kit / Law Cheuk Him; Peter Gabriel Magnaye / Alvin Morada	18; 21	13; 21
5	(Hong Kong) (Philippines)	Ng Ka Long; Michael Kevin Cudiamat	21; 16	21; 9

==== South Korea vs Hong Kong ====
South Korea
3
GMC Balayogi Indoor Stadium, Court 3
18 February 2016 11:30

Hong Kong
2

			1	2	3
1	(South Korea) (Hong Kong)	Son Wan-ho; Hu Yun	21; 14	14; 21	13; 21
2	(South Korea) (Hong Kong)	Kim Gi-jung / Kim Sa-rang; Or Chin Chung / Tang Chun Man	21; 14	15; 21	21; 5
3	(South Korea) (Hong Kong)	Lee Dong-keun; Ng Ka Long	21; 10	14; 21	16; 21
4	(South Korea) (Hong Kong)	Ko Sung-hyun / Shin Baek-cheol; Chan Tsz Kit / Reginald Lee Chun Hei	21; 10	5; 3		retired
5	(South Korea) (Hong Kong)	Jeon Hyeok-jin; Law Cheuk Him	21; 10	21; 8

== Knockout stage ==
=== Bracket ===
Quarter-finals
19 February
South Korea (1)	3
China	0
19 February
Japan (3)	3
Chinese Taipei	0
19 February
Malaysia	2
India (4)	3
19 February
Hong Kong	0
Indonesia (2)	3

Semi-finals
20 February
South Korea (1)	0
Japan (3)	3
20 February
India (4)	1
Indonesia (2)	3

Final
21 February
Japan (3)	2
Indonesia (2)	3

=== Quarter-finals ===
==== South Korea vs China ====
South Korea
3
GMC Balayogi Indoor Stadium, Court 2
19 February 2016, 16:30
Report

China
0

			1	2	3
1	(South Korea) (China)	Son Wan-ho; Tian Houwei	21; 18	21; 18
2	(South Korea) (China)	Kim Gi-jung / Kim Sa-rang; Li Junhui / Qiu Zihan	21; 16	21; 14
3	(South Korea) (China)	Lee Dong-keun; Wang Zhengming	14; 21	22; 20	21; 12
4	(South Korea) (China)	Ko Sung-hyun / Shin Baek-cheol; Wang Yilyu / Zhang Wen				not played
5	(South Korea) (China)	Jeon Hyeok-jin; Qiao Bin				not played

==== Japan vs Chinese Taipei ====
Japan
3
GMC Balayogi Indoor Stadium, Court 4
19 February 2016, 16:30
Report

Chinese Taipei
0

			1	2	3
1	(Japan) (Chinese Taipei)	Kento Momota; Chou Tien-chen	21; 15	21; 18
2	(Japan) (Chinese Taipei)	Hiroyuki Endo / Kenichi Hayakawa; Lee Sheng-mu / Tsai Chia-hsin	21; 16	21; 12
3	(Japan) (Chinese Taipei)	Sho Sasaki; Hsu Jen-hao	21; 6	21; 12
4	(Japan) (Chinese Taipei)	Takeshi Kamura / Keigo Sonoda; Chen Hung-ling / Wang Chi-lin				not played
5	(Japan) (Chinese Taipei)	Kenta Nishimoto; Wang Tzu-wei				not played

==== Malaysia vs India ====
Malaysia
2
GMC Balayogi Indoor Stadium, Court 1
19 February 2016, 11:30
Report

India
3

			1	2	3
1	(Malaysia) (India)	Zulfadli Zulkiffli; Srikanth Kidambi	14; 21	15; 21
2	(Malaysia) (India)	Low Juan Shen / Tan Kian Meng; Manu Attri / B. Sumeeth Reddy	10; 21	22; 20	16; 21
3	(Malaysia) (India)	Iskandar Zulkarnain Zainuddin; Ajay Jayaram	17; 21	21; 12	21; 16
4	(Malaysia) (India)	Ong Yew Sin / Teo Ee Yi; Pranav Chopra / Akshay Dewalkar	21; 14	14; 21	21; 12
5	(Malaysia) (India)	Soo Teck Zhi; Prannoy H. S.	12; 21	20; 22

==== Hong Kong vs Indonesia ====
Hong Kong
0
GMC Balayogi Indoor Stadium, Court 3
19 February 2016, 11:30
Report

Indonesia
3

			1	2	3
1	(Hong Kong) (Indonesia)	Hu Yun; Tommy Sugiarto	8; 21	13; 21
2	(Hong Kong) (Indonesia)	Or Chin Chun / Tang Chun Man; Mohammad Ahsan / Hendra Setiawan	26; 24	17; 21	19; 21
3	(Hong Kong) (Indonesia)	Ng Ka Long; Anthony Sinisuka Ginting	23; 25	14; 21
4	(Hong Kong) (Indonesia)	Law Cheuk Him / Lee Chun Hei; Angga Pratama / Ricky Karanda Suwardi				not played
5	(Hong Kong) (Indonesia)	Chan Yun Lung; Jonatan Christie				not played

=== Semi-finals ===
==== South Korea vs Japan ====
South Korea
0
GMC Balayogi Indoor Stadium, Court 2
20 February 2016, 16:30
Report

Japan
3

			1	2	3
1	(South Korea) (Japan)	Son Wan-ho; Kento Momota	14; 21	16; 21
2	(South Korea) (Japan)	Kim Gi-jung / Kim Sa-rang; Hiroyuki Endo / Kenichi Hayakawa	21; 19	17; 21	16; 21
3	(South Korea) (Japan)	Lee Dong-keun; Sho Sasaki	22; 20	14; 21	16; 21
4	(South Korea) (Japan)	Ko Sung-hyun / Shin Baek-cheol; Takeshi Kamura / Keigo Sonoda				not played
5	(South Korea) (Japan)	Jeon Hyeok-jin; Kenta Nishimoto				not played

==== India vs Indonesia ====
India
1
GMC Balayogi Indoor Stadium, Court 1
20 February 2016, 16:30
Report

Indonesia
3

			1	2	3
1	(India) (Indonesia)	Srikanth Kidambi; Tommy Sugiarto	21; 14	23; 25	21; 9
2	(India) (Indonesia)	Manu Attri / B. Sumeeth Reddy; Mohammad Ahsan / Hendra Setiawan	11; 21	10; 21
3	(India) (Indonesia)	Ajay Jayaram; Anthony Sinisuka Ginting	15; 21	20; 22
4	(India) (Indonesia)	Pranav Chopra / Akshay Dewalkar; Angga Pratama / Ricky Karanda Suwardi	13; 21	21; 18	15; 21
5	(India) (Indonesia)	Prannoy H. S. Jonatan Christie				not played

=== Final ===
==== Japan vs Indonesia ====
Japan
2
GMC Balayogi Indoor Stadium, Court 1
21 February 2016, 16:30
Report

Indonesia
3

			1	2	3
1	(Japan) (Indonesia)	Kento Momota; Ihsan Maulana Mustofa	21; 17	21; 7
2	(Japan) (Indonesia)	Hiroyuki Endo / Kenichi Hayakawa; Angga Pratama / Ricky Karanda Suwardi	20; 22	21; 14	17; 21
3	(Japan) (Indonesia)	Sho Sasaki; Anthony Sinisuka Ginting	7; 21	16; 21
4	(Japan) (Indonesia)	Takeshi Kamura / Keigo Sonoda; Berry Angriawan / Rian Agung Saputro	21; 16	21; 15
5	(Japan) (Indonesia)	Kenta Nishimoto; Jonatan Christie	21; 14	19; 21	13; 21

== Final ranking ==
Pos	Team	Pld	W	L	Pts	MD	GD	PD	Final result
1st place, gold medalist(s)	Indonesia	6	6	0	6	+15	+24	+228	Champions
2nd place, silver medalist(s)	Japan	6	5	1	5	+18	+36	+344	Runners-up
3rd place, bronze medalist(s)	South Korea	4	3	1	3	+6	+13	+141	Eliminated in semi-finals
3rd place, bronze medalist(s)	India	4	3	1	3	+5	+9	+66	Eliminated in semi-finals
5	Chinese Taipei	4	2	2	2	+4	+9	+94	Eliminated in quarter-finals
6	Malaysia	4	2	2	2	+4	+7	+141	Eliminated in quarter-finals
7	Hong Kong	3	1	2	1	−1	−3	−51	Eliminated in quarter-finals
8	China	3	1	2	1	−3	−4	−10	Eliminated in quarter-finals
9	Thailand	3	1	2	1	−1	0	+111	Eliminated in group stage
10	Sri Lanka	3	1	2	1	−3	−7	−103	Eliminated in group stage
11	Singapore	2	0	2	0	−6	−11	−82	Eliminated in group stage
12	Philippines	2	0	2	0	−8	−14	−131	Eliminated in group stage
13	Nepal	3	0	3	0	−15	−29	−317	Eliminated in group stage
14	Maldives	3	0	3	0	−15	−30	−431	Eliminated in group stage
