= Hilary Chisonga =

Bishop of Masasi, Tanzania

(Gayo) Hilary Chisonga was the Anglican Bishop of Masasi from 1969 until 1983.

Chisonga was educated at St Cyprian's Theological College, Namasakata. He was ordained deacon in 1947; and priest in 1950. He was Canon of Masasi from 1959 to 1968; and Archdeacon of Masasi from 1965 to 1968. He was consecrated Lord Bishop of Masisi in St Mary the Virgin and St Bartholomew's Cathedral Masasi on 21 December 1968.
