= Judith Cunningham =

British politician

Mayor of Bedford
- In office 2002–2003
- Preceded by: Pat Olney
- Succeeded by: Frank Branston

Bedford Borough Council member for Wootton, Bedfordshire
- In office 1996–2011

Personal details
- Party: Liberal Democrats

Judith Cunningham ( – 2024) was a British politician, the final ceremonial Mayor of Bedford, and Liberal Democrat Bedford Borough Councillor for Wootton (1996 – 2011).

== Political career ==
First elected to the Bedford Borough Council in 1996, joining as a Liberal Democrat. She would spend 13 years for the Council in its District mode, two years as a Unitary.

Judith Cunningham became Mayor of Bedford in 2002. She was the second Jewish Mayor of Bedford and last ceremonial Mayor of Bedford.

In 2006 Judith Cunningham won the election borough councillor with a percentage of 47.3% (864 people).

She won the 2009 local election receiving a seat alongside Tim Hill. She received 919 votes.

== Religion ==
Judith Cunningham was Jewish.

== Legacy ==
In 2002 Judith was the final ceremonial Mayor of Bedford, for which she got the reputation of being the last "true" Mayor of Bedford.
