= Edward Lavender Moulton =

English businessman and civic leader (1836-1914)

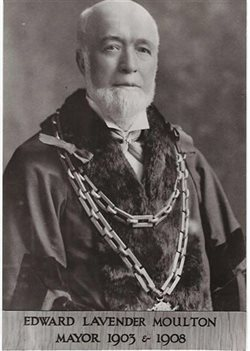
Edward Lavender Moulton's official Mayoral portrait.

Edward Lavender Moulton (11 March 1836 – 12 February 1914) was an English businessman and civic leader in Bedford, England, best known for serving two terms as Mayor of Bedford (1903–04 and 1908–09).

== Personal life ==
Edward Lavender Moulton was born into a farming family at Chatteris, Cambridgeshire on 11 March 1836. Son of Richard Moulton and Sarah Lavender.

By 1871, Moulton moved to Bedford to manage a local ironmongery business. Which he ran in partnership with a man called Henry Pain, at 35 High Street (the former Barley Mow pub site) . The partnership was dissolved a short time later and Edward Moulton continued to run the business until 1887 when it was taken over by a man called Henry Bacchus.

In 1890 Moulton married Anna Grimmer in Norwich.

Moulton would resided with his family at “Winthorpe,” 3 The Embankment, a prominent riverside house in Bedford.

== Political career ==
Proceeding his retirement in 1887 he became a Town Councillor from 1887 - 1888.

Politically, Moulton was associated with the Liberal Party where he served as President of the Bedford Liberal Club. In 1888 he and fellow candidates George Haynes and Thomas Spencer published a campaign address pledging to work “for the good of all classes” of Bedford’s citizens.

After several years abroad post exiting the position of Town Councillor, he returned to Bedford and again entered local politics. In 1898 he was chosen as an Alderman for the Bedford Borough, serving as alderman from 1898 until 1910.

He served as Mayor of Bedford in 1903–04 and again in 1908–09.

Beyond the mayoralty, Moulton went on to hold several other important public posts. He was a Governor of the Harpur Trust. He also served as the second Chairman of the Bedford Education Committee. He also chaired the Corporation’s Estates Committee, overseeing municipal property.

In 1906 he was appointed a Justice of the Peace for the Bedford Borough, administering local justice.

== Religion ==
Edward Lavender Moulton was an active member of his church, acting as churchwarden at St. Cuthbert’s in Bedford. Which during his lifetime acted as a Church of England church.

== Death ==
In late 1913 Moulton suffered a serious stroke; although he partially recovered, he remained largely incapacitated. He died at home on 12 February 1914 at the age of 77. His will (dated 10 October 1913) was proved at the Principal Probate Registry in April 1914. Moulton was buried in Bedford

== Legacy ==
He was described by contemporaries as “a ready and forcible speaker, tenacious in his views, [and] firm and quick-witted as a chairman”
