= Beau Bassin-Rose Hill =

- Town
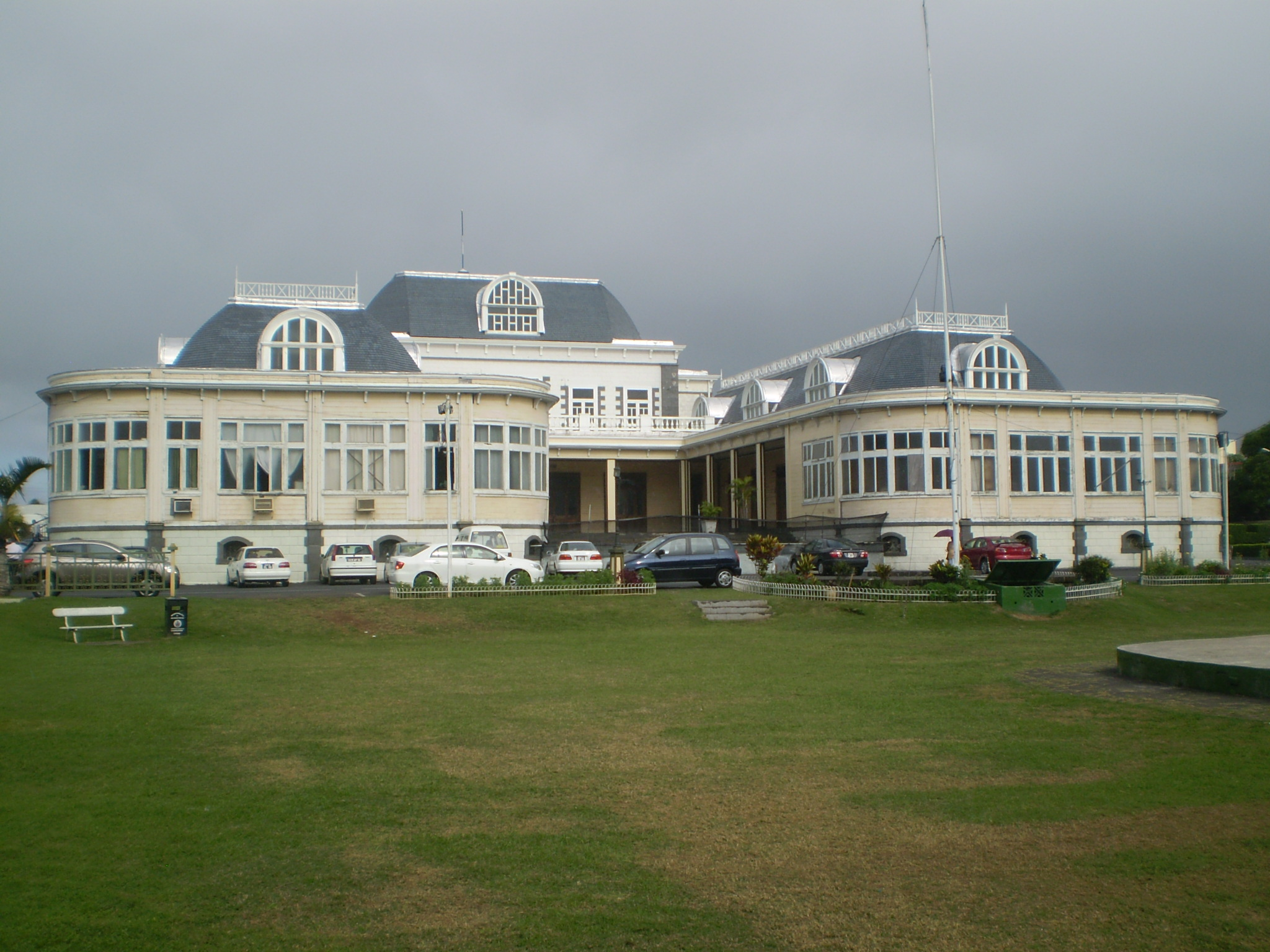
- Plaza

- Flag
- Motto: "Tenax et Fidelis"
- Municipal Council location
- Coordinates: 20°14′23.3″S 57°28′18.1″E
- Country: Mauritius
- District: Plaines Wilhems
- Settled: 1722
- Established: 1868: Rose Hill
- Established: 1877: Beau Bassin
- Twin-Town: 1896

Government
  - Type: Municipality
  - Mayor: Mr. Louis Toussaint André, OSK
  - Deputy Mayor: Mrs. Gina Poonoosamy

Area
  - Total: 20.2 km^{2} (7.8 sq mi)
- Elevation: 164 m (538 ft)

Population (2018)
  - Total: 104,610
  - Rank: 3rd in Mauritius
  - Density: 5,180/km^{2} (13,400/sq mi)
- Time zone: UTC+4 (MUT)
- Climate: Am
- Website: Municipal Council

Beau Bassin-Rose Hill (or Beau-Bassin Rose-Hill; Mauritian Creole pronunciation: [bobasɛ̃ ʁozil]; French: Villes sœurs) is a town in Mauritius, located in the Plaines Wilhems District. It is administered by the Municipal Council of Beau Bassin-Rose Hill and has a population of 147,066 inhabitants, making it the third largest city on the island.

== Etymology ==
Beau Bassin-Rose Hill is the combination of both French and English words which reflects the island's colonial history. The name 'Beau Bassin' translates to beautiful pond in English, which is derived from the pond on the estate of Jean Nicolas Bouchet. 'Rose Hill' is believed to refer to the rosy hues cast by the setting sun on the Corps de Garde mountain.

== History ==
In 1788 the Beau Bassin sugar factory began to operate during the French colonial period. The first settlement developed around the estate and the pond. The factory closed its doors in 1868.

== Local administration ==
=== Municipal elections ===
Municipal elections are held every six years, the mandate of the Mayor and Deputy Mayor is two years, then another one is chosen by the members of the board through a system of voting. For the Municipal elections held in November 2012, the town of Beau-Bassin Rose-Hill was divided into six wards compared to four previously. The current mayor of the town is Mr. Louis Toussaint André elected on May 2026.

== Politics ==
For the general elections, the town is classified as no.19 known as Stanley and Rose Hill and no.20 known as Beau Bassin and Petite Revière.

== Sports ==
The football team which represents the town is the Union Sportive de Beau-Bassin Rose-Hill, its home stadium is the Sir Gaetan Duval Stadium, the team currently plays in the National First Division for the 2014–2015 season. In 2026, playing in the National Super League, the team was in the 9th position

The Serge Alfred Swimming Pool is found in Beau-Bassin. It was built in preparation for the 1985 Indian Ocean Island Games. It was named in honor of Serge Alfred, a Mauritian teacher of the Queen Elizabeth College and accomplished swimmer who tragically drowned on 19 April 1966 while attempting to save four schoolgirls who drowned at the Pomponette beach. The swimming pool features eight lanes and has a capacity of 250 spectators.

== Education ==
- John Kennedy College
- St Mary's College
- Loreto College Rose Hill
- St Andrew's School
- Collège de La Confiance
- Queen Elizabeth College
- New Devton College
- SSS Beau-Bassin
- New Eton College
- Institut Cardinal Jean Margéot (Maison de Carné)

== Suburbs ==
The town of Beau Bassin-Rose Hill is divided into different regions:

- Barkly
- Beau-Bassin
- Camp-Levieux
- Chebel
- Coromandel
- Lower Beau-Bassin
- Mont-Roches
- Plaisance
- Roches-Brunes
- Rose-Hill
- Stanley
- Trèfles
- Vuillemin

== Twin towns – sister cities ==
Beau-Bassin Rose-Hill is twinned with:

- (France) Saint-Pierre, Réunion
- (Mauritius) Quartier-Militaire
- Majunga, Madagascar
- Victoria, Seychelles
- (China) Changzhou
- Ethekwini, South Africa

== See also ==
- Jardin Balfour (Mauritius)
- List of places in Mauritius
- The regional news website of the town
