= 2023 Babergh District Council election =

2023 local government election in Babergh

- 4 May 2023

All 32 seats to Babergh District Council 17 seats needed for a majority

	First party	Second party	Third party
Leader	Leigh Jamieson		Simon Barrett
Party	Green	Independent	Conservative
Last election	4 seats, 23.3%	8 seats, 19.5%	15 seats, 34.8%
Seats before	4	14 (Note: Of the fourteen independent councillors prior to the election, ten formed the "Independent" group led by Clive Arthey and four formed the "Independent Conservative" group led by John Ward.)	10
Seats won	10	9	7
Seat change	▲6	▲1	▼8
Popular vote	11,116	5,671	8,610
Percentage	31.1%	15.9%	24.1%
Swing	▲7.8%	▼3.6%	▼10.7%
	Fourth party	Fifth party
Leader	Sue Carpendale
Party	Liberal Democrats	Labour
Last election	3 seats, 10.3%	2 seats, 9.6%
Seats before	3	1
Seats won	5	1
Seat change	▲2	▼1
Popular vote	5,645	4,680
Percentage	15.8%	13.1%
Swing	▲5.5%	▲3.5%
- Winner of each seat at the 2023 Babergh District Council election
Leader before election
John Ward
Independent
No overall control
Leader after election
David Busby
Liberal Democrat
No overall control

The 2023 Babergh District Council election was held on 4 May 2023 to elect members of Babergh District Council in Suffolk, England. This was on the same day as other local elections.

== Summary ==
Prior to the election the council was under no overall control, being run by a coalition of independents, Greens, Liberal Democrats and Labour, led by independent councillor John Ward who had been initially appointed as a Conservative before leaving the party in 2022.

All parties, excluding the Conservatives, stood increased numbers of candidates since the 2019 election. The number of Labour and Liberal Democrat candidates doubled and the Green Party stood a full-slate for the first time at a Babergh District Council election. In contrast to the other parties, the number of Conservative candidates substantially declined, with several former councillors opting to stand as Independents.

The council remained under no overall control, with the Greens emerging as the largest party. Conservative group leader Simon Barrett lost his seat. Conversely, Deputy Council Leader and Independent Group Leader Clive Arthey was heavily defeated in Lavenham, which the Conservatives targeted hard, thus culminating in their only gain of the election.

A coalition of the Greens, independents and Liberal Democrats formed after the election with an agreement that leadership would rotate between the groups across the four years to the next election, with Liberal Democrat councillor David Busby being leader for the first year, Green councillor Deborah Saw leading for the second and fourth years and independent councillor John Ward leading for the third year.

== Overall results ==
2023 Babergh District Council election
Party	Candidates	Seats	Gains	Losses	Net gain/loss	Seats %	Votes %	Votes	+/−
Green	32	10	7	1	▲6	31.3	31.1	11,116	+7.8
Independent	13	9	3	1	▲1	28.1	15.9	5,671	–3.6
Conservative	21	7	1	9	▼8	21.9	24.1	8,610	–10.7
Liberal Democrats	23	5	2	0	▲2	15.6	15.8	5,645	+5.5
Labour	22	1	0	1	▼1	3.1	13.1	4,680	+3.5

== Ward results ==
The Statement of Persons Nominated, which details the candidates standing in each ward, was released by Babergh District Council following the close of nominations on 5 April 2023. The results for each ward were as follows, with an asterisk (*) indicating an incumbent councillor standing for re-election.

=== Assington ===
Assington
Party	Candidate	Votes	%	±%
Liberal Democrats	Lee Parker	452	49.8	N/A
Conservative	Richard Sunderland	341	37.6	+4.5
Green	Amy Aylett	115	12.7	–4.7
Majority		111	12.2	N/A
Turnout		917	41.0	+1.6
Registered electors		2,237		
Liberal Democrats gain from Independent		Swing	N/A	

=== Box Vale ===
Box Vale
Party	Candidate	Votes	%	±%
Liberal Democrats	Bryn Hurren*	684	64.0	–16.1
Conservative	Fred Topham	180	16.8	–3.1
Green	Theresa Munson	154	14.4	N/A
Labour	Rupert Perry	51	4.8	N/A
Majority		504	47.2	–13.9
Turnout		1,071	46.3	–1.5
Registered electors		2,313		
Liberal Democrats hold		Swing	▼6.5	

=== Brantham ===
Brantham
Party	Candidate	Votes	%	±%
Independent	Alastair McCraw*	560	77.7	–8.2
Green	Miriam Burns	101	14.0	+7.0
Labour	Steven Hunter	60	8.3	N/A
Majority		459	63.7	–15.1
Turnout		721	33.9	–7.0
Registered electors		2,127		
Independent hold		Swing	▼7.9	

=== Brett Vale ===
Brett Vale
Party	Candidate	Votes	%	±%
Independent	John Ward*	457	39.7	N/A
Conservative	Shaun Davis	352	30.6	–16.2
Green	Peter Lynn	158	13.7	–6.2
Labour	Lindsay Francis	102	8.9	N/A
Liberal Democrats	Benjamin Herbig	81	7.0	N/A
Majority		105	9.1	N/A
Turnout		1,151	43.7	+2.9
Registered electors		2,636		
Independent gain from Conservative		Swing	N/A	

=== Bures St Mary & Nayland ===
Bures St Mary & Nayland
Party	Candidate	Votes	%	±%
Conservative	Isabelle Reece	369	39.8	–13.4
Green	Patrick McKenna	319	34.4	–12.4
Liberal Democrats	Rain Welham-Cobb	165	17.8	N/A
Labour	Julian Freeman	73	7.9	N/A
Majority		50	5.4	–1.0
Turnout		932	41.6	+7.4
Registered electors		2,242		
Conservative hold		Swing	▲0.5	

=== Capel St Mary ===
Capel St Mary
Party	Candidate	Votes	%	±%
Liberal Democrats	John Whyman	635	79.0	–0.1
Green	Andrew Iredale Jaswal	169	21.0	N/A
Majority		466	58.0	–0.2
Turnout		821	31.4	–6.2
Registered electors		2,616		
Liberal Democrats hold		Swing	N/A	

=== Chadacre ===
Chadacre (2 seats)
Party	Candidate	Votes	%	±%
Conservative	Michael Holt*	748	46.5	–5.6
Independent	Stephen Plumb*	712	44.3	–21.3
Green	Ralph Carpenter	541	33.6	+8.8
Green	Polly Rodger-Brown	314	19.5	–2.1
Labour	Matthew Marshall	278	17.3	N/A
Liberal Democrats	Cheryl Schmidt	203	12.6	N/A
Turnout		1,609	33.4	+2.1
Registered electors		4,824		
Conservative hold				
Independent hold				

=== Copdock & Washbrook ===
Copdock & Washbrook
Party	Candidate	Votes	%	±%
Liberal Democrats	David Busby*	591	56.4	–5.0
Conservative	Christopher Hudson	309	29.5	–9.1
Green	Karen Marshall	147	14.0	N/A
Majority		282	26.9	+4.1
Turnout		1,061	39.8	±0.0
Registered electors		2,663		
Liberal Democrats hold		Swing	▲2.1	

=== East Bergholt ===
East Bergholt
Party	Candidate	Votes	%	±%
Green	Sallie Davies	546	52.7	+27.0
Independent	John Hinton*	253	24.4	–20.0
Conservative	Stephen Williams	141	13.6	–16.4
Labour	Adrian James	74	7.1	N/A
Liberal Democrats	Lauren De Banks	22	2.1	N/A
Majority		293	28.3	N/A
Turnout		1,044	46.5	+5.6
Registered electors		2,243		
Green gain from Independent		Swing	▲23.5	

=== Ganges ===
Ganges
Party	Candidate	Votes	%	±%
Independent	Derek Davis*	310	45.9	–25.0
Conservative	Shane Rolin	190	28.1	+14.1
Green	Shazz Kennedy	67	9.9	+1.7
Labour	Simon Whitney	63	9.3	N/A
Liberal Democrats	Paul Woodcraft	45	6.7	–0.1
Majority		120	17.8	–39.1
Turnout		676	34.1	–7.9
Registered electors		1,982		
Independent hold		Swing	▼19.6	

=== Great Cornard ===
Great Cornard (3 seats)
Party	Candidate	Votes	%	±%
Green	Ruth Hendry	694	35.4	+14.6
Conservative	Mark Newman*	660	33.7	–4.5
Conservative	Peter Beer*	658	33.6	–5.7
Conservative	Judith Wilson	627	32.0	–3.8
Labour	Emma Bishton	545	27.8	–3.1
Labour	Kevin Graham	542	27.6	–0.6
Labour	Tom Keane	450	22.9	–3.0
Green	Melanie Boyce	438	22.3	+5.0
Green	Heather James	396	20.2	+4.0
Liberal Democrats	Marjorie Bark	387	19.7	+5.5
Turnout		1,961	27.4	+2.0
Registered electors		7,152		
Green gain from Conservative				
Conservative hold				
Conservative hold				

=== Hadleigh North ===
Hadleigh North
Party	Candidate	Votes	%	±%
Green	Simon Dowling	230	33.8	+13.8
Conservative	Sian Dawson*	199	29.3	–6.7
Independent	Gordon McLeod	101	14.9	N/A
Liberal Democrats	David Butcher	80	11.8	–10.5
Labour	Andy Kennedy	70	10.3	–11.5
Majority		31	4.5	N/A
Turnout		686	30.3	–2.2
Registered electors		2,266		
Green gain from Conservative		Swing	▲10.3	

=== Hadleigh South ===
Hadleigh South (2 seats)
Party	Candidate	Votes	%	±%
Green	Jane Carruthers	539	40.4	+16.2
Independent	Kathryn Grandon*	498	37.3	–17.5
Green	Alex Parvu	483	36.2	+20.1
Conservative	Alan Ferguson	418	31.3	+2.6
Liberal Democrats	Duncan Read	250	18.7	N/A
Labour	Mark Heath	171	12.8	–8.8
Turnout		1,334	30.1	–3.9
Registered electors		4,435		
Green gain from Conservative				
Independent hold				

=== Lavenham ===
Lavenham (2 seats)
Party	Candidate	Votes	%	±%
Conservative	Margaret Maybury*	966	52.7	+6.8
Conservative	Paul Clover	844	46.1	+7.6
Independent	Clive Arthey*	376	20.5	–22.9
Liberal Democrats	Nigel Adam	363	19.8	N/A
Green	Shaun Moffat	355	19.4	–14.0
Green	Steve Nuttall	256	14.0	N/A
Labour	Andrew Worpole	242	13.2	N/A
Turnout		1,832	40.7	+1.6
Registered electors		4,499		
Conservative hold				
Conservative gain from Independent				

=== Long Melford ===
Long Melford (2 seats)
Party	Candidate	Votes	%	±%
Independent	John Nunn*	1,069	65.2	–11.2
Independent	Liz Malvisi*	571	34.8	N/A
Conservative	Melanie Barrett	399	23.4	–13.1
Green	Fae Gilfillan	279	17.0	–5.9
Labour	Michael Fitzmaurice	228	13.9	N/A
Green	Michael Chapman	201	12.3	±0.0
Liberal Democrats	Alan Scott	124	7.6	N/A
Turnout		1,639	32.8	–3.6
Registered electors		4,993		
Independent hold				
Independent gain from Conservative				

=== North West Cosford ===
North West Cosford
Party	Candidate	Votes	%	±%
Green	Deborah Saw	630	82.9	+12.3
Liberal Democrats	Mark Whyman	130	17.1	N/A
Majority		500	65.8	+24.6
Turnout		804	36.8	–8.8
Registered electors		2,187		
Green hold		Swing	N/A	

=== Orwell ===
Orwell
Party	Candidate	Votes	%	±%
Green	Daniel Potter	509	63.4	–9.0
Liberal Democrats	Chris Janes	191	23.8	N/A
Labour	Keith Wade	103	12.8	N/A
Majority		318	39.6	–6.1
Turnout		824	38.7	–6.1
Registered electors		2,129		
Green hold		Swing	N/A	

=== South East Cosford ===
South East Cosford
Party	Candidate	Votes	%	±%
Green	Leigh Jamieson*	811	88.9	
Liberal Democrats	Rebecca Simpson	101	11.1	+11.1
Majority		710	77.9	N/A
Turnout		938	43.6	N/A
Registered electors		2,152		
Green hold		Swing		

=== Sproughton & Pinewood ===
Sproughton & Pinewood (2 seats)
Party	Candidate	Votes	%	±%
Liberal Democrats	Helen Davies	496	41.3	N/A
Conservative	Brian Riley	474	39.4	+2.6
Green	Mary Cook	327	27.2	–4.4
Labour	Mary Manuel	237	19.7	–11.9
Labour	Graham Manuel	223	18.6	N/A
Green	John Lyall	176	14.6	N/A
Turnout		1,202	26.6	+2.5
Registered electors		4,511		
Liberal Democrats gain from Green				
Conservative hold				

=== Stour ===
Stour
Party	Candidate	Votes	%	±%
Independent	Mary McLaren*	448	46.0	N/A
Green	Carrie Wheeler	216	22.2	+5.0
Liberal Democrats	James Gilchrist	194	19.9	–4.1
Labour	Tracy De Bernhardt Wood	116	11.9	N/A
Majority		232	23.8	N/A
Turnout		980	40.4	–0.1
Registered electors		2,428		
Independent gain from Conservative		Swing	N/A	

=== Sudbury North East ===
Sudbury North East
Party	Candidate	Votes	%	±%
Labour Co-op	Alison Owen*	176	37.7	+1.3
Independent	Jan Osborne	129	27.6	N/A
Conservative	Simon Barrett	79	16.9	–9.2
Green	Julie Fowles-Smith	48	10.3	–1.8
Liberal Democrats	Gareth Evans	35	7.5	N/A
Majority		47	10.1	–0.2
Turnout		472	23.4	–2.1
Registered electors		2,013		
Labour Co-op hold		Swing	N/A	

=== Sudbury North West ===
Sudbury North West (2 seats)
Party	Candidate	Votes	%	±%
Green	Jessie Carter	800	55.7	+38.1
Green	Tim Regester	537	37.4	+23.9
Conservative	Nicholas Younger	348	24.3	–9.1
Liberal Democrats	Nigel Bennett	312	21.7	–3.0
Labour	Adrian Stohr	272	19.0	–11.3
Labour	Matthew Olyver	265	18.5	–4.7
Turnout		1,435	34.6	+3.8
Registered electors		4,142		
Green gain from Conservative				
Green gain from Labour				

=== Sudbury South East ===
Sudbury South East
Party	Candidate	Votes	%	±%
Independent	Adrian Osborne*	187	28.3	N/A
Labour Co-op	David Finnigan	172	26.0	–8.1
Green	Debo Adams	136	20.6	+7.8
Conservative	Portia Berry-Kilby	117	17.7	–24.5
Liberal Democrats	Martin Bark	49	7.4	–3.5
Majority		15	2.3	N/A
Turnout		662	34.6	+3.8
Registered electors		1,911		
Independent gain from Conservative		Swing	N/A	

=== Sudbury South West ===
Sudbury South West
Party	Candidate	Votes	%	±%
Green	Laura Smith	414	50.1	+38.4
Conservative	Jacqueline Rawlinson	191	23.1	–12.5
Labour	Luke Cresswell	167	20.2	–7.7
Liberal Democrats	Andrew Welsh	55	6.7	–6.8
Majority		223	27.0	N/A
Turnout		841	38.0	+3.2
Registered electors		2,215		
Green gain from Conservative		Swing	▲25.5	

== Changes 2023–2027 ==
- March 2026: Michael Holt, elected as a Conservative councillor for Chadacre, joined Reform UK.

=== Copdock & Washbrook ===
Copdock & Washbrook by-election: 16 October 2025
Party	Candidate	Votes	%	±%
Reform	Marc Rowland	323	32.0	N/A
Liberal Democrats	Mark Hurley	292	28.9	–27.5
Green	Miriam Burns	238	23.6	+9.6
Conservative	Harry Cansdale	140	13.9	–15.9
Labour	Simon Whitney	17	1.7	N/A
Majority		31	3.1	N/A
Turnout		1,020	37.7	–2.1
Registered electors		2,703		
Reform gain from Liberal Democrats				

The by-election was triggered by the death of Liberal Democrat councillor David Busby on 27 July 2025.
