= Grade I listed buildings in Bedfordshire =

Bedfordshire shown within England

There are approximately 372,905 listed buildings in England and 2.5% of these are Grade I. This page is a list of these buildings in the county of Bedfordshire, by district.

== Bedford ==
| Name | Location | Type | Completed (Note: The date given is the date used by Historic England as significant for the initial building or that of an important part in the structure's description.) | Date designated | Grid ref. (Note: The grid reference is based on the British national grid reference system, sometimes known as OSGB36, used by the Ordnance Survey.) Geo-coordinates | Entry number (Note: The "List Entry Number" is a unique number assigned to each listed building and scheduled monument by Historic England.) | Image |
|---|---|---|---|---|---|---|---|
| Parish Church of St James | Biddenham, Borough of Bedford | Parish Church | Norman | 13 July 1964 | TL0140949938; 52°08′18″N 0°31′11″W | 1158130 | Parish Church of St James More images |
| Church St Mary the Virgin | Keysoe, Bolnhurst and Keysoe | Parish Church | Late 12th century | 13 July 1964 | TL0739062490; 52°15′00″N 0°25′42″W | 1114778 | Church St Mary the Virgin More images |
| Parish Church of St Owen | Bromham Park, Bromham | Parish Church | 13th to 15th century | 13 July 1964 | TL0134951259; 52°09′01″N 0°31′13″W | 1114226 | Parish Church of St Owen More images |
| Diocesan Youth Centre, St Nicholas Church | Carlton and Chellington | Youth Club | 13th century | 13 July 1964 | SP9608456310; 52°11′48″N 0°35′44″W | 1114239 | Diocesan Youth Centre, St Nicholas Church More images |
| Parish Church of Saint Mary | Carlton, Carlton and Chellington | Parish Church | Anglo-Saxon | 13 July 1964 | SP9517654852; 52°11′01″N 0°36′34″W | 1114248 | Parish Church of Saint Mary More images |
| Church of St Thomas of Canterbury | Clapham | Parish Church | Saxon | 13 July 1964 | TL0340152482; 52°09′39″N 0°29′23″W | 1114251 | Church of St Thomas of Canterbury More images |
| Parish Church of St Denys | Colmworth | Parish Church | c. 1430 | 13 July 1964 | TL1088458580; 52°12′51″N 0°22′42″W | 1114867 | Parish Church of St Denys More images |
| Parish Church of All Saints | Cople | Parish Church | 15th century | 13 July 1964 | TL1032348469; 52°07′25″N 0°23′24″W | 1114154 | Parish Church of All Saints More images |
| Church of All Saints | Upper Dean, Dean and Shelton | Parish Church | 14th century | 13 July 1964 | TL0467967640; 52°17′49″N 0°27′59″W | 1321269 | Church of All Saints More images |
| Church of St Mary the Virgin | Shelton, Dean and Shelton | Parish Church | Late 12th century | 13 July 1964 | TL0337768796; 52°18′27″N 0°29′07″W | 1114802 | Church of St Mary the Virgin More images |
| Hillersdon Mansion | Elstow | Abbey | 14th century | 7 May 1952 | TL0493047363; 52°06′53″N 0°28′09″W | 1321607 | Hillersdon Mansion More images |
| Parish Church of St Mary and St Helena | Elstow | Abbey | Early 12th century | 13 July 1964 | TL0490747396; 52°06′54″N 0°28′10″W | 1114168 | Parish Church of St Mary and St Helena More images |
| Parish Church Tower | Elstow | Tower | 15th century | 13 July 1964 | TL0489147410; 52°06′54″N 0°28′11″W | 1312577 | Parish Church Tower More images |
| Parish Church of St Mary | Felmersham | Parish Church | 13th century | 13 July 1964 | SP9914157846; 52°12′36″N 0°33′02″W | 1321569 | Parish Church of St Mary More images |
| Barford Bridge and Causeway | Great Barford | Bridge | 15th century | 13 July 1964 | TL1345251597; 52°09′04″N 0°20′36″W | 1114887 | Barford Bridge and Causeway More images |
| Parish Church of St Peter | Harrold | Parish Church | Early 13th century | 13 July 1964 | SP9538656670; 52°12′00″N 0°36′21″W | 1321537 | Parish Church of St Peter More images |
| Church of All Saints | Church End, Kempston Rural | Parish Church | Norman | 13 July 1964 | TL0153147994; 52°07′15″N 0°31′06″W | 1114281 | Church of All Saints More images |
| Parish Church of St Margaret | Knotting, Knotting and Souldrop | Parish Church | 12th century | 13 July 1964 | TL0026063475; 52°15′37″N 0°31′57″W | 1310943 | Parish Church of St Margaret More images |
| Church of All Saints | Little Staughton | Parish Church | 13th century | 13 July 1964 | TL1073562993; 52°15′14″N 0°22′45″W | 1114812 | Church of All Saints More images |
| Church of St Mary the Virgin | Yelden, Melchbourne and Yielden | Church | 13th century | 13 July 1964 | TL0112467153; 52°17′36″N 0°31′07″W | 1137357 | Church of St Mary the Virgin More images |
| Parish Church of St Mary Magdalene | Melchbourne, Melchbourne and Yielden | Parish Church | Medieval | 13 July 1964 | TL0286465393; 52°16′37″N 0°29′37″W | 1312146 | Parish Church of St Mary Magdalene More images |
| Milton Ernest Hall | Milton Ernest | Country House | 1853-8 | 14 June 1971 | TL0170455731; 52°11′26″N 0°30′49″W | 1310881 | Milton Ernest Hall More images |
| Parish Church of All Saints | Milton Ernest | Parish Church | Norman | 13 July 1964 | TL0200556107; 52°11′38″N 0°30′33″W | 1321521 | Parish Church of All Saints More images |
| Church of St Mary | Oakley | Parish Church | Late 12th century | 13 July 1964 | TL0106252968; 52°09′57″N 0°31′26″W | 1159864 | Church of St Mary More images |
| Parish Church of All Saints | Odell | Parish Church | 15th century | 13 July 1964 | SP9667858008; 52°12′43″N 0°35′11″W | 1310757 | Parish Church of All Saints More images |
| Parish Church of St Peter | Pavenham | Parish Church | 13th century | 13 July 1964 | SP9914455953; 52°11′34″N 0°33′04″W | 1160091 | Parish Church of St Peter More images |
| Church of St Peter | Pertenhall | Parish Church | c. 1190 | 13 July 1964 | TL0842365417; 52°16′34″N 0°24′44″W | 1114827 | Church of St Peter More images |
| Church of St Michael and All Saints | Farndish, Podington | Church | Late 12th century | 13 July 1964 | SP9279463715; 52°15′50″N 0°38′30″W | 1114345 | Church of St Michael and All Saints More images |
| Hinwick House | Hinwick, Podington | Country House | 1708–1714 | 7 May 1952 | SP9360161945; 52°14′52″N 0°37′49″W | 1160476 | Hinwick House More images |
| Parish Church of St Mary | Podington | Parish Church | Norman | 13 July 1964 | SP9417762684; 52°15′15″N 0°37′18″W | 1321514 | Parish Church of St Mary More images |
| Parish Church of All Saints | Ravensden | Parish Church | Late 12th century | 13 July 1964 | TL0777554316; 52°10′36″N 0°25′31″W | 1321235 | Parish Church of All Saints More images |
| Parish Church of All Saints | Renhold | Parish Church | 14th century | 13 July 1964 | TL0888752848; 52°09′47″N 0°24′34″W | 1138110 | Parish Church of All Saints More images |
| Church of All Saints | Riseley | Parish Church | 12th century | 13 July 1964 | TL0395263067; 52°15′21″N 0°28′43″W | 1137548 | Church of All Saints More images |
| Parish Church of St Peter | Sharnbrook | Parish Church | Norman | 13 July 1964 | SP9935859590; 52°13′32″N 0°32′48″W | 1160824 | Parish Church of St Peter More images |
| Parish Church of St Leonard | Stagsden | Parish Church | Norman | 13 July 1964 | SP9823449085; 52°07′53″N 0°33′59″W | 1161056 | Parish Church of St Leonard More images |
| Bushmead Priory | Bushmead, Staploe | Augustinian Monastery | 13th century | 7 May 1952 | TL1157660730; 52°14′00″N 0°22′03″W | 1146475 | Upload Photo |
| Parish Church of St Mary | Stevington | Parish Church | Saxon | 13 July 1964 | SP9904053647; 52°10′20″N 0°33′11″W | 1310202 | Parish Church of St Mary More images |
| Church of St Nicholas | Swineshead | Parish Church | 14th century | 13 July 1964 | TL0578565846; 52°16′50″N 0°27′03″W | 1114834 | Church of St Nicholas More images |
| All Saints Church | Turvey | Parish Church | Medieval | 13 July 1964 | SP9403352545; 52°09′47″N 0°37′36″W | 1039598 | All Saints Church More images |
| Turvey House | Turvey | Country House | 1793-4 | 7 May 1952 | SP9387952783; 52°09′55″N 0°37′44″W | 1039600 | Turvey House More images |
| Parish Church of Saint Nicholas | Wilden | Parish Church | 14th century | 13 July 1964 | TL0941255229; 52°11′04″N 0°24′04″W | 1311656 | Parish Church of Saint Nicholas More images |
| Dovecote of Former Manor House | Willington | Dovecote | 1535 and 1541 | 13 July 1964 | TL1064949966; 52°08′13″N 0°23′05″W | 1321578 | Dovecote of Former Manor House More images |
| Stables of Former Manor House | Willington | Stable | 1535 and 1541 | 13 July 1964 | TL1060549908; 52°08′11″N 0°23′07″W | 1114191 | Stables of Former Manor House More images |
| Parish Church of St Mary the Virgin | Wootton | Parish Church | 14th century | 13 July 1964 | TL0037245068; 52°05′41″N 0°32′10″W | 1249239 | Parish Church of St Mary the Virgin More images |
| Parish Church of St Lawrence | Wymington | Parish Church | Mid-14th century | 13 July 1964 | SP9552164398; 52°16′10″N 0°36′06″W | 1249349 | Parish Church of St Lawrence More images |
| Church of St Mary | Bedford | Parish Church | C10-C11 origins | 6 June 1952 | TL0513049394; 52°07′58″N 0°27′56″W | 1114516 | Church of St Mary More images |
| Church of St Paul | Bedford | Church | 14th century | 6 June 1952 | TL0498549678; 52°08′08″N 0°28′03″W | 1321436 | Church of St Paul More images |
| Church of St Peter | Bedford | Church | Norman | 14 May 1971 | TL0506250115; 52°08′22″N 0°27′59″W | 1146340 | Church of St Peter More images |
| Statue of John Howard | Bedford | Statue | 19th century | 14 May 1971 | TL0505749684; 52°08′08″N 0°27′59″W | 1321437 | Statue of John Howard More images |

== Central Bedfordshire ==
| Name | Location | Type | Completed | Date designated | Grid ref. Geo-coordinates | Entry number | Image |
|---|---|---|---|---|---|---|---|
| Parish Church of St Andrew | Ampthill, Central Bedfordshire | Parish Church | C14-15 | 17 July 1971 | TL0370738264; 52°01′59″N 0°29′23″W | 1114420 | Parish Church of St Andrew More images |
| Ruins of Houghton House, Houghton Park | Ampthill | Great House | c. 1620 | 16 March 1972 | TL0392239484; 52°02′38″N 0°29′10″W | 1321465 | Ruins of Houghton House, Houghton Park More images |
| Church of Saint Peter | Arlesey | Parish Church | 12th century | 31 October 1966 | TL1919537539; 52°01′24″N 0°15′51″W | 1113817 | Church of Saint Peter More images |
| Church of St Nicholas | Barton-le-Clay | Church | 12th to 15th century | 3 February 1967 | TL0854230405; 51°57′42″N 0°25′18″W | 1321346 | Church of St Nicholas More images |
| Church of Saint Peter and All Saints | Battlesden | Parish Church | 13th century | 23 January 1961 | SP9590429095; 51°57′08″N 0°36′21″W | 1311979 | Church of Saint Peter and All Saints More images |
| Parish Church of St Edmund or St James | Blunham | Parish Church | Early 12th century | 31 October 1966 | TL1530851104; 52°08′46″N 0°18′59″W | 1321759 | Parish Church of St Edmund or St James More images |
| Chicksands Priory | Chicksands, Campton and Chicksands | Country House | Dissolved 1539 | 10 January 1985 | TL1216539294; 52°02′27″N 0°21′58″W | 1137590 | Chicksands Priory More images |
| Church of All Saints | Chalgrave | Tower | 1889 | 3 February 1967 | TL0086027430; 51°56′10″N 0°32′04″W | 1321351 | Church of All Saints More images |
| Church of Saint Peter and Saint Paul | Cranfield | Parish Church | 12th century | 23 January 1961 | SP9557641980; 52°04′05″N 0°36′26″W | 1114029 | Church of Saint Peter and Saint Paul More images |
| Dunstable Priory | Dunstable | Priory | Norman | 25 October 1951 | TL0212821870; 51°53′10″N 0°31′03″W | 1114581 | Dunstable Priory More images |
| Priory House Gateway | Dunstable | Gate | 15th century | 4 March 1976 | TL0208521860; 51°53′09″N 0°31′05″W | 1321391 | Priory House Gateway |
| Church of St Mary | Eaton Bray | Church | Early English | 3 February 1967 | SP9698520733; 51°52′36″N 0°35′33″W | 1321356 | Church of St Mary More images |
| Church of St George | Edworth | Parish Church | Earlier origins | 31 October 1966 | TL2223340680; 52°03′04″N 0°13′08″W | 1113833 | Church of St George More images |
| Church of St Mary | Everton | Parish Church | Mid-12th century | 26 November 1986 | TL2032751294; 52°08′49″N 0°14′34″W | 1114064 | Church of St Mary More images |
| Church of All Saints | Eyeworth | Parish Church | 14th and 15th century | 31 October 1966 | TL2497745596; 52°05′41″N 0°10′37″W | 1137817 | Church of All Saints More images |
| Church of Saint John the Baptist | Flitton and Greenfield | Parish Church | 15th century | 23 January 1961 | TL0593635850; 52°00′40″N 0°27′28″W | 1113903 | Church of Saint John the Baptist More images |
| The De Grey Mausoleum adjoining Church of St John the Baptist | Flitton and Greenfield | Commemorative Monument | 1614 | 23 January 1961 | TL0595335864; 52°00′40″N 0°27′28″W | 1113904 | The De Grey Mausoleum adjoining Church of St John the Baptist More images |
| Church of St Peter and St Paul | Flitwick | Chapter House | 1983 | 23 January 1961 | TL0292634226; 51°59′49″N 0°30′08″W | 1137705 | Church of St Peter and St Paul More images |
| Church of St Mary the Virgin | Lower Gravenhurst, Gravenhurst | Parish Church | Earlier | 23 January 1961 | TL1107535247; 52°00′16″N 0°23′00″W | 1311911 | Church of St Mary the Virgin More images |
| Church of Saint Mary the Virgin | Harlington | Parish Church | 14th century | 23 January 1961 | TL0378730551; 51°57′50″N 0°29′27″W | 1321734 | Church of Saint Mary the Virgin More images |
| Haynes Park | Church End, Haynes | Country House | c. 1725 | 22 October 1952 | TL0798941715; 52°03′48″N 0°25′34″W | 1321815 | Haynes Park More images |
| Church of St Mary the Virgin | Henlow | Parish Church | 12th century | 31 October 1966 | TL1781238759; 52°02′05″N 0°17′02″W | 1312654 | Church of St Mary the Virgin More images |
| Church of All Saints | Houghton Conquest | Parish Church | Early 14th century | 23 January 1961 | TL0435741425; 52°03′41″N 0°28′45″W | 1113919 | Church of All Saints More images |
| Church of All Saints | Houghton Regis | Church | 14th century | 3 February 1967 | TL0183623958; 51°54′18″N 0°31′16″W | 1114707 | Church of All Saints More images |
| Church of Saint Mary the Virgin | Salford, Hulcote and Salford | Bell Tower | 19th century | 23 January 1961 | SP9359239099; 52°02′33″N 0°38′13″W | 1114035 | Church of Saint Mary the Virgin More images |
| Church of St Nicholas | Hulcote, Hulcote and Salford | Parish Church | c. 1590 | 23 January 1961 | SP9443438833; 52°02′24″N 0°37′29″W | 1114036 | Church of St Nicholas More images |
| Garden Houses and Retaining Walls to Terraced Gardens at Luton Hoo | Luton Hoo Estate, Hyde | Garden Temple | | 26 September 1980 | TL1047618446; 51°51′13″N 0°23′51″W | 1158944 | Garden Houses and Retaining Walls to Terraced Gardens at Luton Hoo More images |
| Luton Hoo | Luton Hoo Estate, Hyde | Country House | 1760s | 29 April 1952 | TL1045118552; 51°51′17″N 0°23′52″W | 1321301 | Luton Hoo More images |
| Church of St Mary | Church End, Kensworth | Church | Norman | 3 February 1967 | TL0312619042; 51°51′38″N 0°30′14″W | 1159080 | Church of St Mary More images |
| Church of Saint Andrew | Langford | Parish Church | 13th century | 31 October 1966 | TL1857441409; 52°03′30″N 0°16′19″W | 1113840 | Church of Saint Andrew More images |
| Church of St Mary | Linslade, Leighton-Linslade | Church | Norman | 20 February 1954 | SP9102026813; 51°55′57″N 0°40′39″W | 1114528 | Church of St Mary More images |
| Leighton Buzzard Church of All Saints | Leighton Buzzard, Leighton-Linslade | Parish Church | Medieval | 1 May 1975 | SP9190024867; 51°54′53″N 0°39′55″W | 1321404 | Leighton Buzzard Church of All Saints More images |
| Parish Church of St Mary the Virgin | Marston Moretaine | Parish Church | Early 14th century | 23 January 1961 | SP9961841153; 52°03′35″N 0°32′54″W | 1114047 | Parish Church of St Mary the Virgin More images |
| Tower Belonging to Church of St Mary the Virgin | Marston Moretaine | Tower | 14th century | 23 January 1961 | SP9962141183; 52°03′36″N 0°32′54″W | 1311714 | Tower Belonging to Church of St Mary the Virgin More images |
| Church of Saint Peter | Milton Bryan | Parish Church | 12th century | 23 January 1961 | SP9711030795; 51°58′02″N 0°35′16″W | 1138238 | Church of Saint Peter More images |
| Moggerhanger House | Mogerhanger | Country House | 18th century | 31 October 1966 | TL1353248665; 52°07′29″N 0°20′35″W | 1137422 | Moggerhanger House More images |
| Parish Church of St Mary the Virgin | Northill | Collegiate Church | 1404–1547 | 31 October 1966 | TL1490046551; 52°06′19″N 0°19′26″W | 1221856 | Parish Church of St Mary the Virgin More images |
| Parish Church of St Leonard | Old Warden | Abbey | 12th century | 31 October 1966 | TL1367044321; 52°05′08″N 0°20′33″W | 1274774 | Parish Church of St Leonard More images |
| Warden Abbey | Old Warden | Abbey | 1135 | 16 January 1952 | TL1206243850; 52°04′54″N 0°21′58″W | 1222165 | Warden Abbey More images |
| Church of St Mary | Potton | Parish Church | 13th-century origins | 31 October 1966 | TL2286449437; 52°07′47″N 0°12′23″W | 1321657 | Church of St Mary More images |
| Church of All Saints | Shillington | Parish Church | 14th century | 23 January 1961 | TL1237733941; 51°59′33″N 0°21′53″W | 1312508 | Church of All Saints More images |
| Banqueting House | Wrest Park, Silsoe | Banqueting House | 1709–11 | 10 January 1985 | TL0918534742; 52°00′01″N 0°24′39″W | 1113807 | Banqueting House More images |
| Wrest Park House and Service Block Comprising Pavilions, Clock Tower and the Dairy | Silsoe | Country House | 1834–39 | 10 January 1985 | TL0912935583; 52°00′29″N 0°24′41″W | 1311484 | Wrest Park House and Service Block Comprising Pavilions, Clock Tower and the Dairy More images |
| North Terrace approximately 50 Metres North of House | Southill Park, Southill | Balustrade | 1795–1800 | 31 October 1966 | TL1435342117; 52°03′56″N 0°20′00″W | 1274438 | Upload Photo |
| Southill Park House | Southill Park, Southill | Country House | 17th century | 16 January 1952 | TL1433342066; 52°03′55″N 0°20′01″W | 1237988 | Southill Park House More images |
| Church of St John the Baptist | Stanbridge | Church | Late 13th century | 3 February 1967 | SP9656824229; 51°54′30″N 0°35′51″W | 1321308 | Church of St John the Baptist More images |
| Church of St Margaret | Streatley | Church | 14th century | 3 February 1967 | TL0701528604; 51°56′44″N 0°26′40″W | 1321310 | Church of St Margaret More images |
| Church of St Mary | Studham | Church | Early 13th century | 3 February 1967 | TL0159115976; 51°49′59″N 0°31′37″W | 1159252 | Church of St Mary More images |
| Church of St Mary | Sundon | Church | 13th century | 3 February 1967 | TL0481626853; 51°55′49″N 0°28′37″W | 1159488 | Church of St Mary More images |
| Church of All Saints | Sutton | Parish Church | 13th century | 31 October 1966 | TL2190647532; 52°06′46″N 0°13′16″W | 1138081 | Church of All Saints More images |
| Church of All Saints | Tilsworth | Church | 13th century | 3 February 1967 | SP9751424281; 51°54′31″N 0°35′02″W | 1159512 | Church of All Saints More images |
| Church of Saint Nicholas | Tingrith | Parish Church | 15th century | 23 January 1961 | TL0072732436; 51°58′53″N 0°32′05″W | 1113944 | Church of Saint Nicholas More images |
| Church of St George | Toddington | Church | 13th century | 3 February 1967 | TL0100428942; 51°56′59″N 0°31′54″W | 1159540 | Church of St George More images |
| Church of St Giles | Church End, Totternhoe | Church | 14th century | 3 February 1967 | SP9884020885; 51°52′40″N 0°33′56″W | 1159758 | Church of St Giles More images |
| Woburn Abbey | Woburn Park, Woburn | Abbey | 1145–1547 | 22 October 1952 | SP9646332551; 51°58′59″N 0°35′49″W | 1114006 | Woburn Abbey More images |
| Basin Bridge | Woburn Park, Woburn | Bridge | pre 1813 | 23 January 1961 | SP9620632389; 51°58′54″N 0°36′02″W | 1114019 | Basin Bridge More images |
| Chinese Dairy and adjoining Covered Ways at Woburn Park | Woburn Park, Woburn | Ornamental Pond | c. 1788 | 23 January 1961 | SP9663732625; 51°59′01″N 0°35′39″W | 1321667 | Chinese Dairy and adjoining Covered Ways at Woburn Park More images |
| North Stableblock approximately 100 Metres East of Woburn Abbey | Woburn Park, Woburn | Stable | c. 1750 | 23 January 1961 | SP9664432559; 51°58′59″N 0°35′39″W | 1158192 | North Stableblock approximately 100 Metres East of Woburn Abbey More images |
| Sculpture Gallery, adjoining South Side of South Stableblock | Woburn Park, Woburn | Conservatory | c. 1790 | 23 January 1961 | SP9662032443; 51°58′55″N 0°35′40″W | 1158201 | Sculpture Gallery, adjoining South Side of South Stableblock More images |
| South Stableblock approx 100 Metres East of Woburn Abbey | Woburn Park, Woburn | Stable | c. 1750 | 23 January 1961 | SP9663432460; 51°58′56″N 0°35′40″W | 1114011 | South Stableblock approx 100 Metres East of Woburn Abbey More images |
| The Camelia House adjoining East End of Sculpture Gallery | Woburn Park, Woburn | Camellia House | 1822 | 23 January 1961 | SP9665232435; 51°58′55″N 0°35′39″W | 1114012 | Upload Photo |
| Church of Saint John the Baptist | Cockayne Hatley, Wrestlingworth and Cockayne Hatley | Parish Church | 13th century | 31 October 1966 | TL2561649653; 52°07′51″N 0°09′58″W | 1114107 | Church of Saint John the Baptist More images |
| Church of St Peter | Wrestlingworth, Wrestlingworth and Cockayne Hatley | Parish Church | 12th-century origins | 31 October 1966 | TL2592347366; 52°06′37″N 0°09′45″W | 1321637 | Church of St Peter More images |

== Luton ==
| Name | Location | Type | Completed | Date designated | Grid ref. Geo-coordinates | Entry number | Image |
|---|---|---|---|---|---|---|---|
| Parish Church of St Mary | Luton | Parish Church | Earlier | 10 September 1954 | TL0953221204; 51°52′43″N 0°24′37″W | 1114615 | Parish Church of St Mary More images |

== See also ==
- Category:Grade I listed buildings in Bedfordshire
- Grade II* listed buildings in Bedfordshire
