= Listed buildings in Melchbourne and Yielden =

Melchbourne and Yielden is a civil parish in Bedford, Bedfordshire, England. It contains 20 listed buildings that are recorded in the National Heritage List for England. Of these, two are listed at Grade I, the highest of the three grades, one is listed at Grade II*, the middle grade and, the others are at Grade II, the lowest grade.

== Key ==
Grade	Criteria
I	Buildings of exceptional interest, sometimes considered to be internationally important
II*	Particularly important buildings of more than special interest
II	Buildings of national importance and special interest

== Buildings ==
Name and location	Photograph	Date	Notes	Grade
The Old Rectory; 52.29420°N 0.51719°W	—	16th century	Former rectory for the parish church, now a private dwelling. Constructed from course limestone rubble with ashlar dressings, and an old clay tile roof that is hipped at the east end. There is a 16th century block to the east, and a late 17th or early 18th century central block with a slightly later extension to the west end, all of two storeys.	II
Castle Cottage; 52.29164°N 0.51673°W		18th century	18th century cottage, that was formerly a pair, of colour washed roughcast possibly over a timber frame. A half-hipped thatched roof covers the two room, single storey building. There are further single storey extensions to the rear and north gable end.	II
35, Knotting Road; 52.27990°N 0.49488°W	—	Late 17th to early 18th century	Timber framed cottage of a roughcast exterior, with a brick and roughcast bay to the southwest, all colour washed with a modern tile roof. The main house has two storeys, and there is 19th century colour washed brick extension to the northeast, plus a 19th century lean-to against the southwest end.	II
Melchbourne House; 52.27632°N 0.49155°W		Early 18th century	Large country house incorporating an earlier house built for the St John family of Bletsoe. Constructed of red brick with stone dressings and a slate roof, the building is arranged in a H-plan with three storeys, with a two storey wing to the northeast, and a further single storey extension at the rear. Inside, the interior was extensively redecorated in 1875, with a painted plasterwork ceiling in the main staircase, a carved marble chimney piece in the drawing room, and a coffered ceiling and panelling in the library. The long gallery on the second floor has extant 18th century pine panelling, including finely carved doorway and chimney pieces.	II*
11-18, Park Road; 52.27782°N 0.49427°W		18th century	A row of 8 18th century cottages of cob construction on brick foundations. The exterior is of colour washed pebbledash with a thatched roof topping the single storeys. There are varied red brick chimney stacks on the dividing lines between the cottages, and each cottage is of two bays with a central front door.	II
York Cottage; 52.29309°N 0.51655°W	—	Late 17th to early 18th century	The cottage is of colour washed plaster over a timber frame, with the stonework of a substantial coursed limestone rubble chimney visible at the south end. The cottage is arranged as two rooms over one storey, and there are two red brick integral gable end chimney stacks.	II
Church of St Mary the Virgin; 52.29321°N 0.51869°W		14th century	Parish church, predominantly 14th century in origin. It is constructed of coursed limestone rubble with ashlar dressings. The west tower dates to the 14th century and is of three stages, with a band of carved foliage, animals and grotesque heads under spire eaves. Inside, there are fragmentary wall paintings on the east wall that has been cut b =y the addition of a memorial. An octagonal font, pulpit, and some pews, all date to the 15th century.	I
Chantry Cottage; 52.29119°N 0.51724°W	—	18th century	18th century cottage consisting of two storeys of colour washed pebbledash over a timber frame, with a thatched roof.	II
The Old School House; 52.27765°N 0.49439°W	—	1857	Now a private dwelling, it was originally a schoolhouse constructed for St Andrew St John, 15th Baron St John of Bletso. It is configured in a T-plan with the south wing of two storeys, and the north of one. It is constructed from chequered brick with some stone dressings and a modern tile roof.	II
Eastfield Farmhouse; 52.28439°N 0.46994°W	—	Mid-19th century	A mid-19th century farmhouse of coursed limestone rubble and a two-span slated roof with coped gable ends. The building is of two storeys, and there extension to both gable ends, the eastern end is partly rendered coursed limestone rubble with some brick dressings.	II
Church Cottage; 52.27677°N 0.49351°W	—	17th century	A 17th century cottage of colour washed plaster over a timber frame, with a thatched roof. The cottage is of a T-plan configuration with two storeys throughout. The right bay has a 20th century lean-to extension of one storey.	II
Parish Church of St Mary Magdalene; 52.27707°N 0.49372°W		Medieval	The parish church was substantially remodelled in the late 18th century by Samuel Whitbread, however medieval and 14th century elements are still extant. It is constructed of coursed limestone rubble with ashlar dressings, and there is an early 17th century north porch reputedly from Woodford House. Inside, the box pews and panelling are compete from 1779.	I
Meadow Cottage; 52.27927°N 0.49639°W	—	Early 18th century	Early 18th century cottage with a main wing of colour washed rough cast and a thatched roof, a later wing joined at right angles, with a mix of modern weatherboarding, exposed timber framin, and colour washed roof cast. The whole cottage is one storey throughout.	II
Middle Farm Cottage and Middle Farmhouse; 52.29035°N 0.51669°W	—	17th century	Single building of two separate dwellings. Part colour washed over a framed timber framed, with an extension of local red brick in the 19th century. The roof is of part old clay tiles and part new tiles. Originally a two storey L-plan, there is double-pile plan extension to the right, alongside 20th century extensions to the left and rear.	II
Home Cottage; 52.29328°N 0.51626°W		17th century	Formerly two separate dwellings, now a singular cottage of timber framing with colour washed plaster, less the northeast gable end and adjoining external chimney stack which are of colour washed brick. Laid out as a three room, one storey plan, underneath a thatched roof.	II
Twelve Tree Farmhouse; 52.29310°N 0.51766°W	—	Late 16th to early 17th century	Farmhouse constructed from colour washed roughcast over a timber frame on top of a substantial limestone rubble plinth. The main building is of two storeys under a slate roof, whilst there is a one storey, single bay red brick extension to the north, with a pantiled roof and part colour washed roughcast exterior. To the west of this extension is a further addition of a single storey, red brick structure also with a pantiled roof.	II
Willow Tree Cottage; 52.29047°N 0.51737°W	—	c1700	Single storey cottage of colour washed plaster over a timber frame, less the left hand gable end which is of limestone rubble. There is a small 20th century extension to the front left hand side.	II
9, Park Road; 52.27735°N 0.49428°W		17th century	Formerly two cottages and now a single, two storey dwelling. Constructed from a timber frame, with a colour washed plaster exterior, and a thatched roof. A 20th century lean-to extension is situated at the rear.	II
Chicheley Cottage and Church Cottage; 52.29280°N 0.51807°W		17th century	Timber framed 17th century cottage, with a colour washed roughcast exterior and thatched roof. The cottages are of a single storey, with both a single and a double red brick ridge chimney stack.	II
K6 Telephone Kiosk; 52.29014°N 0.51753°W	—	17th century	Type K6 telephone box, as designed by Sir Giles Gilbert Scott. Cast iron frame with square windows and a domed roof.	II
