= Church of St Mary Magdalene, Melchbourne =

Church in Melchbourne, Bedfordshire, England

Coordinates: 52.2771°N 0.4937°W

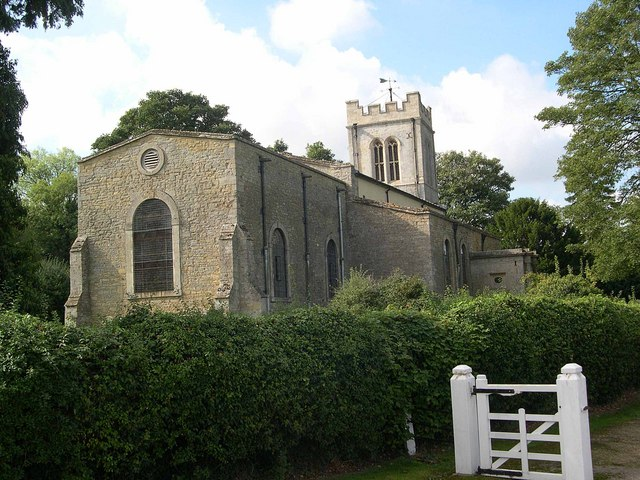
Melchbourne Church.

Church of St Mary Magdalene is a Grade I listed church in Melchbourne, Bedfordshire, England. It became a listed building on 13 July 1964. The church is one of the Stodden Group of churches, which is a group of six parish churches also including All Hallows’ Church in Dean, St Mary's Church in Shelton, St Mary's Church in Yelden, St Nicholas' Church in Swineshead, and St Peter's Church in Pertenhall. The Stodden Group is part of the Sharnbrook Deanery within the Diocese of St Albans in the Church of England.

== See also ==
- Grade I listed buildings in Bedfordshire
