= Church of St Peter & All Saints, Battlesden =

Church in Bedfordshire, England

Coordinates: 51.9521°N 0.6059°W

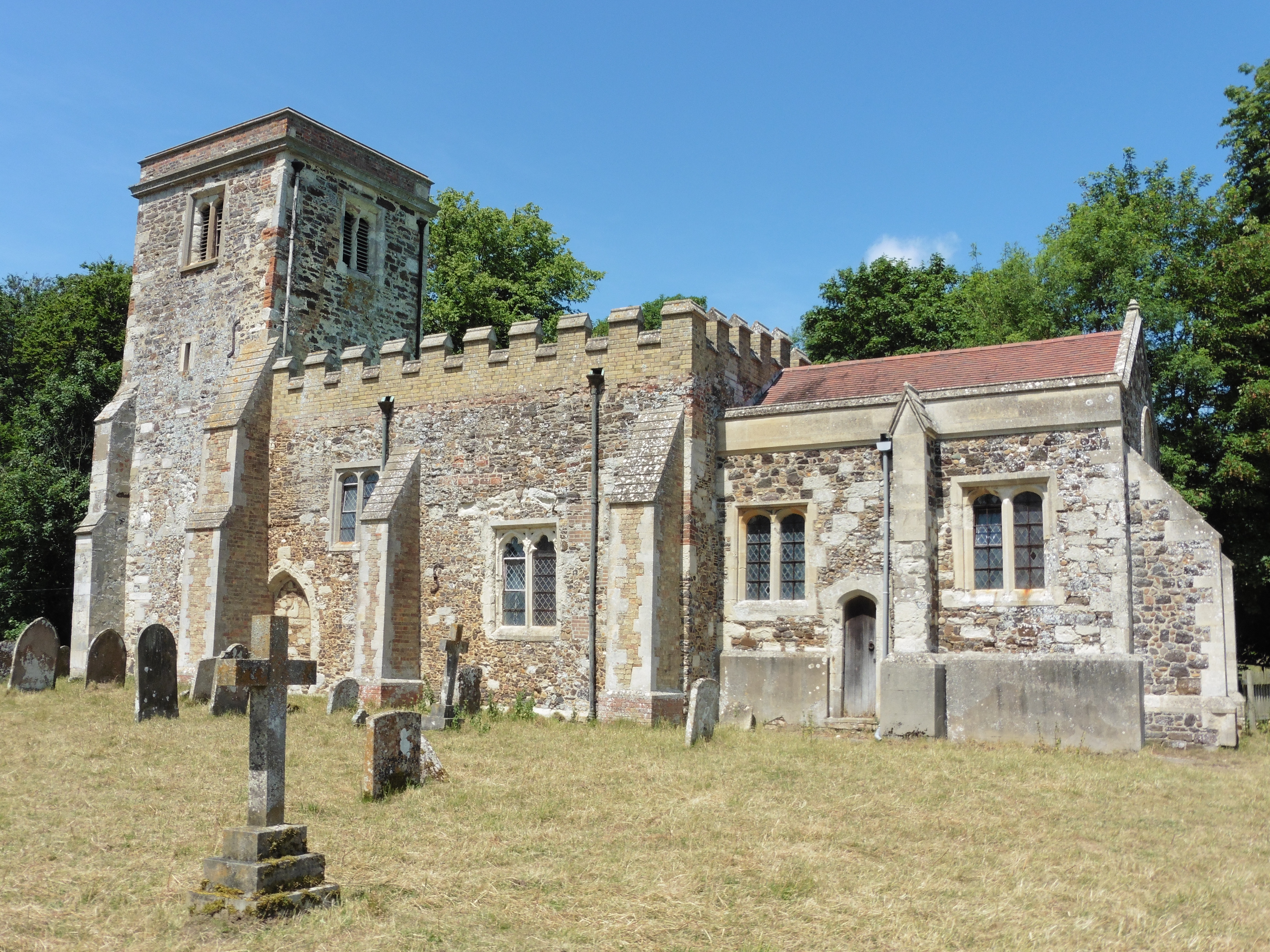

The Church of St Peter & All Saints is a Grade I listed church in Battlesden, Bedfordshire, England. The small church was built in the 13th century with a simple layout of nave, chancel and south porch. It was renovated in the 14th and 15th centuries. The south porch was later demolished and a south-west tower and north porch were added in the 15th century. Several buttresses were added to the tower over the years to correct a tilt caused by weak foundations. The church became a listed building on 23 January 1961. It is open for regular worship for the Parishes of Potsgrove and Battlesden.

== Description ==
The church is located in the small hamlet of Battlesden, Bedfordshire, England. The building, which sits on an elevated site, was constructed in the 13th century with ironstone rubble and ashlar dressings. The small church has a simple layout of nave and chancel. The 13th-century nave has a pointed chancel arch which dates to the 14th century. Two windows illuminate the north wall of the nave, including a two-light 15th century window and a 3-light 17th century window with transom; a 13th century lancet window is placed west of the door. The chancel has a 19th century, 3-light east window. The circular font dates to the 12th century and has foliate carving. The interior contains several marble wall monuments to the Duncombe family: William Duncombe (d. 1603) Lady Elizabeth Duncombe (late 17th century), and John Duncom be (d. 1687).

== History ==
The church was founded in the 13th century and was renovated in the 14th and 15th centuries. It was formerly known as the parish Church of St Peter. There have been numerous repairs to the exterior over the years in both clunch blocks and brick. The original south door and porch were demolished in the 14th century and were replaced by a north doorway and a simple, gabled north porch. Access to the church is now through the north doorway. A south-west tower was added in the 15th century. It was constructed onto the south-west corner of the nave on poor foundations. Six buttresses were added to the tower over several centuries to correct a tilt. In the 19th century, three bells were added to the tower.

After 1928, the church was closed except for the late summer months. The church was closed in the years between 1928 and 1949. The organ and pews were heavily damaged during the Second World War. St Peter and All Saints Church was designated a Grade I listed church on 23 January 1961. The church is open for regular worship for the Parishes of Potsgrove and Battlesden.

== See also ==
- Grade I listed buildings in Bedfordshire
