= Church of St Mary, Sundon =

Church in Sundon, Bedfordshire, England

Coordinates: 51.9303°N 0.4770°W

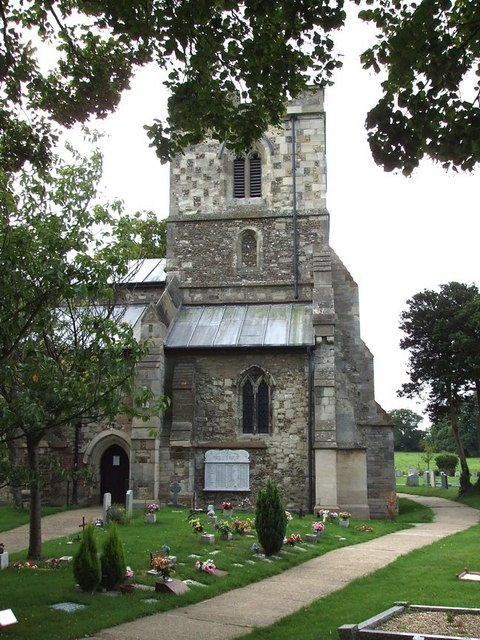
Church of St Mary, Sundon.

Church of St Mary is a Grade I listed church in Lower Sundon, Bedfordshire, England. It became a listed building on 3 February 1967.

== See also ==
- Grade I listed buildings in Bedfordshire
