= Church of St Mary the Virgin, Keysoe =

Church in Bedfordshire, England

Coordinates: 52.2501°N 0.4283°W

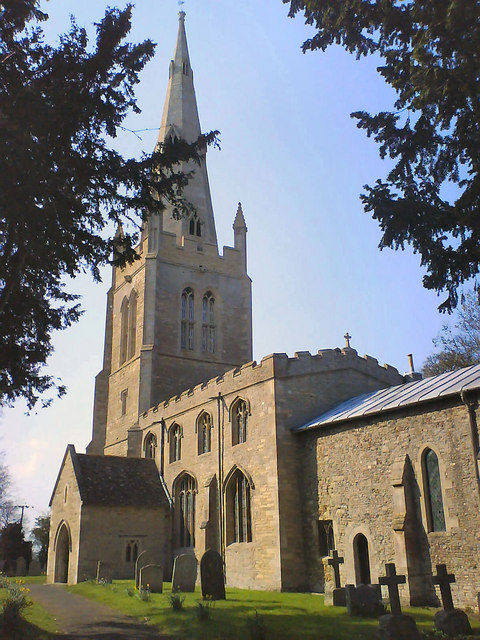

Church of St Mary the Virgin is a Grade I listed church in Keysoe, Bedfordshire, England. It became a listed building on 13 July 1964. Features of interest include the prominent spire, the 14th- and 15th-century roofs and the 14th-century font.

According to local legend, a builder named William Dickens was working on the steeple in 1718 when he slipped and fell. It is said that he was miraculously saved by reciting a prayer in mid-air.

== History ==
The church originally dates from the 12th century.

== See also ==
- Grade I listed buildings in Bedfordshire
