= Church of All Saints, Chalgrave =

Church in Bedfordshire, England

Coordinates: 51.9362°N 0.5343°W

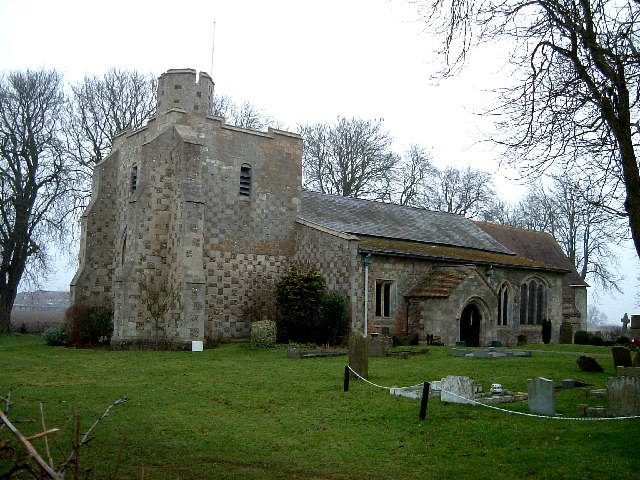
Church of All Saints, Chalgrave

The Church of All Saints is a Grade I listed church in Chalgrave, Bedfordshire, England. It became a listed building on 3 February 1967. The church, dedicated to All Saints, is an old structure, its consecration recorded as taking place in 1219. It features a nave, chancel, and aisles. The large square tower contains three bells. The nave has five bays. Some of the arches are Early English Period, with foliage decorated capitals, while other capitals are moulded. The register dates from the year 1539. Its fittings include two antique tombs with statues of knights in armour. The interior also features a faded wall painting featuring various saints.

== See also ==
- Grade I listed buildings in Bedfordshire
