= Church of St Mary, Studham =

Church in Studham, Bedfordshire, England

Coordinates: 51.8332°N 0.5270°W

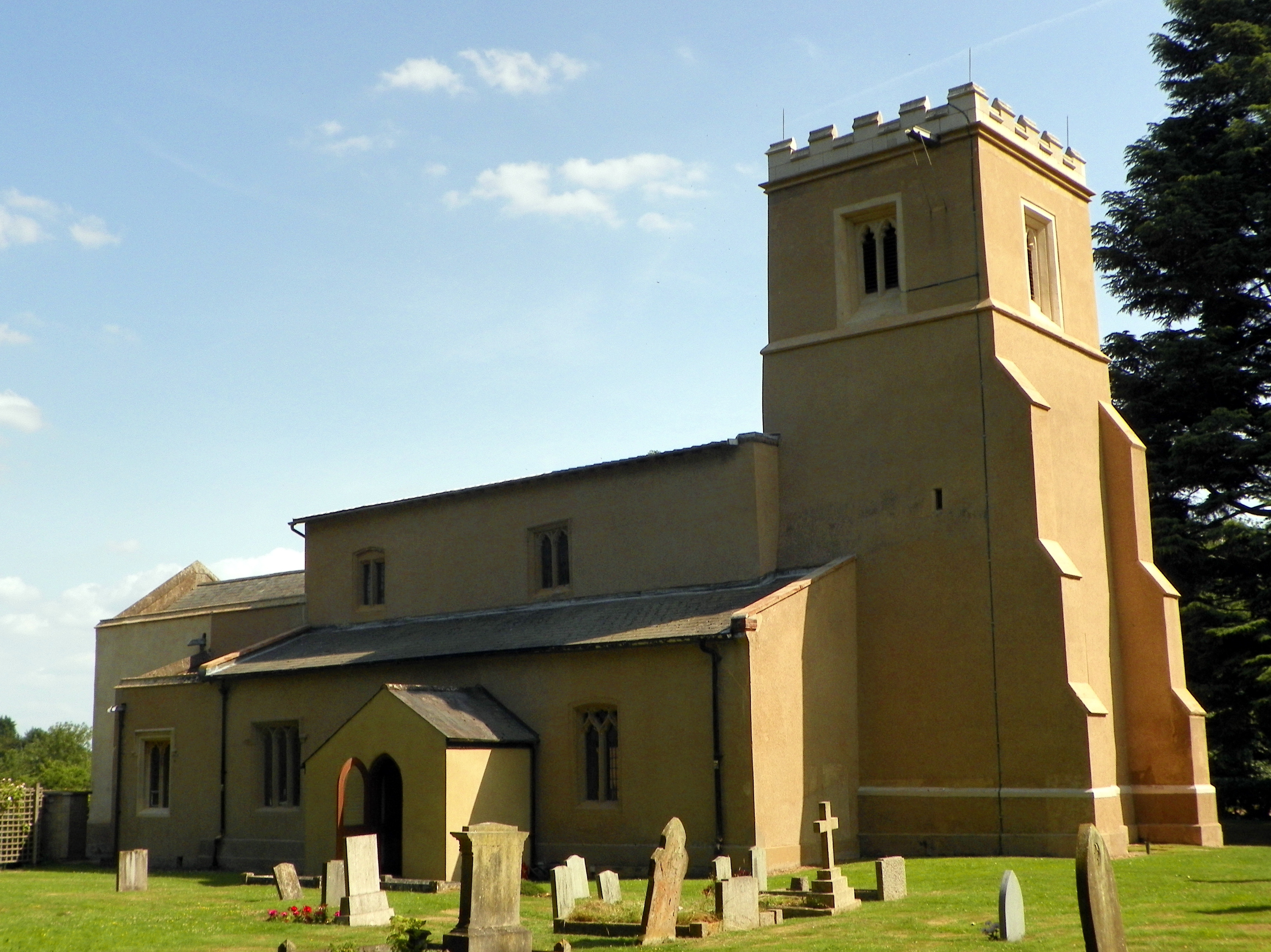
Church of St Mary, Studham

Church of St Mary is a Grade I listed church in Studham, Bedfordshire, England. It became a listed building on 3 February 1967.

== See also ==
- Grade I listed buildings in Bedfordshire
