= Church of All Saints, Houghton Conquest =

Church in Bedfordshire, England

Coordinates: 52.0614°N 0.4792°W

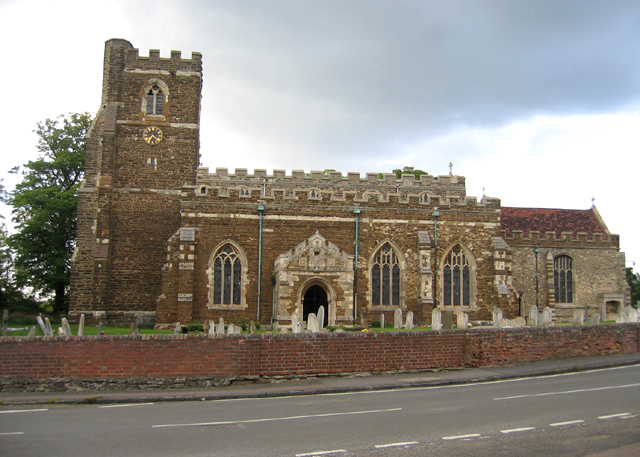

Church of All Saints is a Grade I listed church in Houghton Conquest, Bedfordshire, England. It became a listed building on 23 January 1961. The parish church, dedicated to All Saints, was built during the 14th century. There are also several monuments. Houghton Conquest's rectory was united with that of Houghton-Gildable in 1637, in the archdeaconry of Bedford, and diocese of Lincoln. It was under the patronage of the Master and Fellows of St John's College, Cambridge.

On 4 October 2018 it was reported that the entire lead roof had been stolen.

== Architecture and fittings ==
The church is spacious, built in the Early English Period and Decorated styles. It consists of chancel, nave, aisles, south porch, and an embattled tower containing six bells. It was repaired in 1845. The stained-glass east window, erected in 1880 by John William Burgon, Dean of Chichester, is a memorial to three benefactors. Built in 1830, some of the walls bear traces of frescoes, the designs of which are in some parts sufficiently distinct to be distinguished. Over the north doorway is a huge painting of St Christopher, of the 15th century. On the north walls of the chancel, there is a monument of carved alabaster. There is also an altar slab from 1644, as well as a few mutilated brasses. The register dates from the year 1595.

== Rectors ==
The following rectors are named in The History of All Saints Church Houghton Conquest, by G. P. K. Winlaw, and other sources as cited:

- before 1285: William de Lubenham
- 1285: Geoffrey Conquest
- 1303: Robert de Suddebrok
- 1306: Robert de Morecore
- 1312: John de la Bourne
- 1323: John Speling of Kerdington
- 1323: Simon de Northwode
- 1331: William de Gayton
- 1337: William Conquest
- 1337: John Conquest
- 1349: Henry Balle of Aldwyncle
- 1366: Geoffrey Burgh
- 1399: John Drugge of Kerdington
- 1403: John Jainyil
- 1409: John Mason, The Vicar of Ampthill
- 1409: William Stewenys (Stephens)
- 1409: Ralph Conquest
- 1425: W. Gunwardy, The Bishop of Dunkeld
- 1451: William Hoveden
- 1453: John Freman
- 1456: John Cras
- 1457: John Dey
- 1461: John Tapert
- 1461: Thomas Dey
- 1461: John Bowland
- 1464: Henry Abraham
- 1465: William Stanford
- 1483: Thomas Yerburgh
- 1489: Richard Wright
- 1491: John Underhill
- 1509: Thomas Hunne
- 1510: Humphrey Gascoigne
- 1515: William Frankelyn
- 1524: Ralph Cooke
- 1531: William Coven
- 1536: Thomas Birde
- 1542: John Oldestocke
- 1549: William Tatchame
- 1551: William Walker
- 1557: John Holdstocke

from other sources:

- 1589-1631: Thomas Archer (1554 - 1631), local antiquarian
- 1632: Edward Martin (died 1662), dean of Ely
- 1654: John Poynter (1600–1684), canon of Christ Church Oxford
- 1656-1662: Samuel Fairclough (c. 1625 - 1691) ejected 1662 in favour of Edward Martin above (who then died)
- 4 April 1725: Zachary Grey (1688 – 1766), and vicar of St Giles's and St Peter's in Cambridge
- 1837-1873: Henry John Rose (1800 - 1873), theologian and antiquarian

In addition, two other people have been named as rector:

- Edward Woodley Bowling, named
- Rev. Birch
- Herbert W. Macklin

== See also ==
- Grade I listed buildings in Bedfordshire
