= Church of St Leonard, Stagsden =

Church in Bedfordshire, England

Coordinates: 52.1313°N 0.5663°W

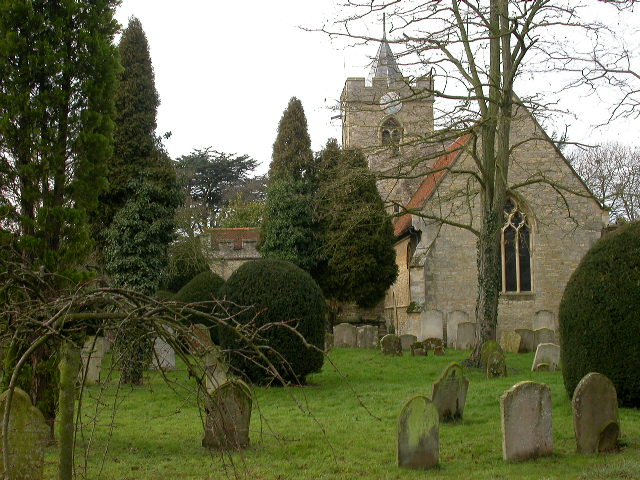
Church of St Leonard, Stagsden

Church of St Leonard is a Grade I listed church in Stagsden, Bedfordshire, England. It became a listed building on 13 July 1964.

== See also ==
- Grade I listed buildings in Bedfordshire
