= Church of St Mary, Stevington =

Coordinates: 52.1722°N 0.5532°W

St Mary the Virgin Church
- St Mary The Virgin Parish Church, Stevington
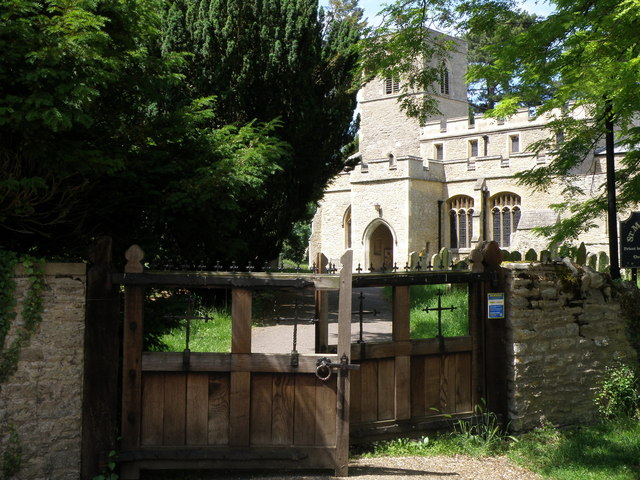
- St Mary the Virgin Church, Stevington
- St Mary the Virgin Church
- Country: England
- Denomination: Church of England
- Website: http://www.stmarystevington.org.uk

History
- Status: Parish church
- Dedication: St Mary the Virgin

Architecture
- Functional status: Active

Administration
- Province: Canterbury
- Diocese: St Albans
- Archdeaconry: Bedford
- Deanery: Bedford

Church of St Mary is a Grade I listed church in Stevington, Bedfordshire, England. It became a listed building on 13 July 1964. It is the Anglican parish church of Stevington, and is part of the Diocese of St Albans.

The first church on this site, as recorded, was started in about 880 AD. The tower is the only surviving part of this original church. The rest of the building was added later and completed in about 1480. The church underwent significant rebuilding in 1872, sponsored by the Duke of Bedford, who was Patron until 1971.

The church has been without permanent clergy since the early 1980s and has relied upon Non-Stipendiary Ministry ever since.

It is currently in interregnum, as the last priest in charge, Reverend David Hunter of New Zealand, resigned the post in 2006.

It is believed that the body of Napoleon Bonaparte's valet from his exile on St Helena is buried in the churchyard. However, parish records are incomplete and the brick vault is too weathered for identification.

The interior of the church boasts some particularly intricate Tudor carved pew ends, as well as a fine rood screen, now moved to the tower.

== See also ==
- Grade I listed buildings in Bedfordshire
