= Church of St Mary, Everton, Bedfordshire =

Church in Bedfordshire, England

Coordinates: 52.1468°N 0.2429°W

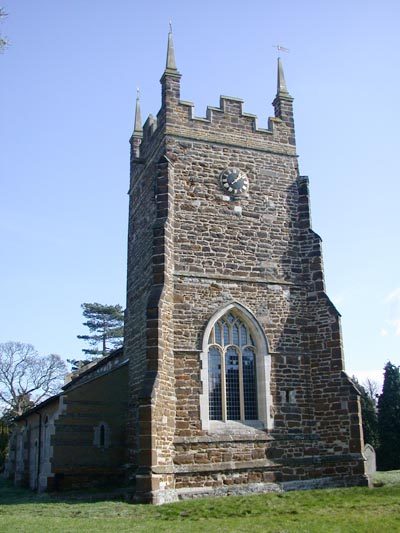
Church of St Mary, Everton.

Church of St Mary is a Grade I listed church in Everton, Bedfordshire, England. It became a listed building on 26 November 1986. Its most famous rector was John Berridge, an early Methodist leader. Sir Humphrey Winch, an eminent judge of the early seventeenth century, was buried here in 1625.

== See also ==
- Grade I listed buildings in Bedfordshire
