= Church of All Saints, Cople =

Church in Bedfordshire, England

Coordinates: 52°07′25″N 0°23′24″W

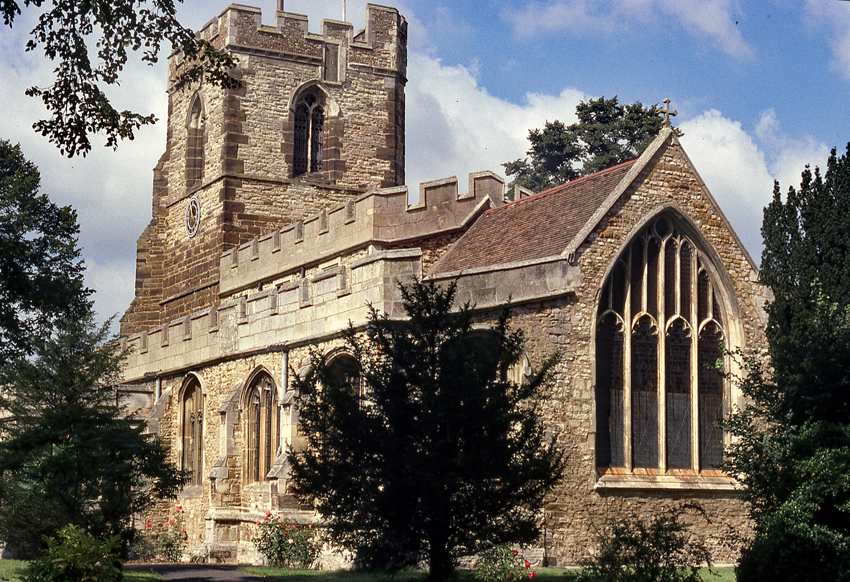
- Church of All Saints, Cople
- Address: Grange Lane, Cople
- Country: England
- Denomination: Anglican

History
- Founded: c. 1430
- Dedication: All Saints

Architecture
- Style: Early English Period and Perpendicular

Specifications
- Materials: Limestone and ironstone rubble with ashlar coursing

Administration
- Diocese: St. Albans
- Parish: Cople

Church of All Saints is a Grade I listed church in Cople, Bedfordshire, England. It became a listed building on 13 July 1964. The church, dedicated to All Saints, is constructed of sandstone and Dunstable clunch, in the Early English Period and Perpendicular styles. It contains a chancel with side chapels, nave with clerestory, aisles, south porch and a tower containing 6 bells (it had 5 bells until the mid 20th century when the sixth was added, the pub next to the church is still called The Five Bells).

The bells are regularly rung for church services and weddings but not on Christmas Eve after complaints from a near neighbour stopped the near 250 year tradition of the bells ringing out to the village to welcome the celebrations of the birth of Christ. Bell ringing practice is undertaken on a Wednesday evening between 7:30 to 8:45 (correct in March 2025) with visitors welcome to try or sit and watch. The bells are uncommon in the fact the ring of the bells is to the right and not the more traditional left with bands of ringers coming far and wide to visit the tower to ring the bells in what is considered backwards.

The tower clock has one face to the south side of the building with little attention taken as the clock is normally a little behind the time in London but a little ahead of the time in Plymouth. An earlier large sun dial is set into the same south wall which would have been the original time piece of the village.

On the north side of the chancel, there are two marble altar tombs, one to Walter Luke, 1544, and wife Anne Launcelyn, 1538, the brass retaining traces of inlaid colour, other of C16 with brasses to Thomas Grey and Benet (Launcelyn) his wife, and their sons and daughters. Chancel floor has brass to John Launcelyn and wife Margaret, 1435, reusing C14 brass (F.W. Kuhlicke,"A Palimpsest Brass at Cople" The nave and chancel have been restored since 1877. The register dates from the year 1560. Its patron was Christ Church, Oxford.

== See also ==
- Grade I listed buildings in Bedfordshire
