= Church of St Nicholas, Barton le Clay =

Church in Bedfordshire, England

Coordinates: 51.9615°N 0.4217°W

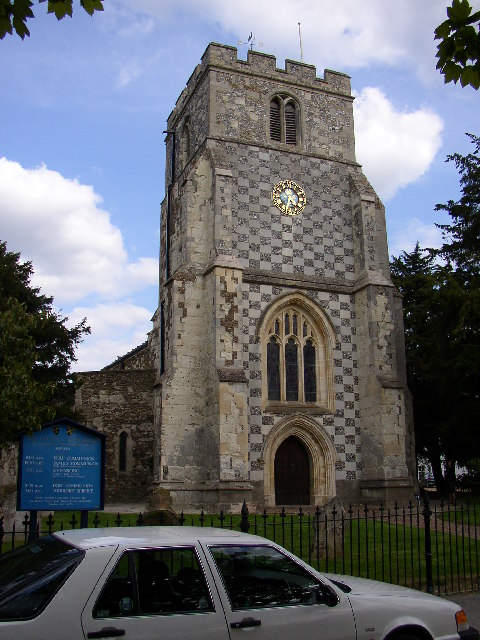
St Nicholas' Church

Church of St Nicholas is a Grade I listed church in Barton le Clay, Bedfordshire, England. It became a listed building on 3 February 1967.

== History ==
Barton-le-Clay was mentioned in the Domesday Book. St Nicholas' Church was first mentioned in 1178. It was mentioned by Pope Alexander III as being part of Ramsey Abbey. This continued until the dissolution of the monasteries by King Henry VIII of England when it became property of the Church of England under The Crown. As it was treated as part of the Abbey, The Crown retained the right of presentation which had always been granted except in 1660 when the Bishop of Ely made the collation.

=== Architecture ===
The church was rebuilt in the 13th century, with the nave being expanded in the 14th century with the church tower being built in the 15th century. The tower has a chequerboard pattern. The north aisle has carved figureheads of the Twelve Apostles and a 14th-century stained glass window of Saint James the Greater. The west end features a thirteenth-century lancet window. The south aisle is more modern but contains 13th century stones in prominent places under the windows. At the west end, it features an early example of blackletter memorial smalls from 1370 and 1400. In 1879, it underwent restoration.

In 1967, it was granted grade I listed status by English Heritage. It is surrounded by 19th century iron railings with a lamppost which has its own separate grade II listed status.

== See also ==
- Grade I listed buildings in Bedfordshire
