= Church of St Peter, Milton Bryan =

Coordinates: 51.9672°N 0.5879°W

St. Peter's Church
- St. Peter's Church, Milton Bryan
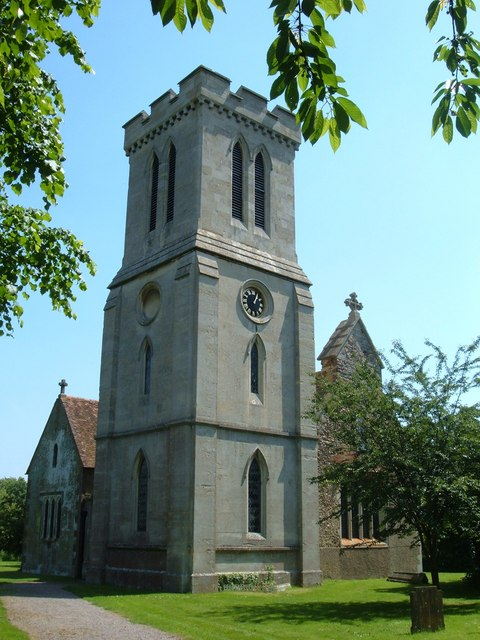
- St. Peter's Church
- Country: England
- Denomination: Church of England

History
- Status: Parish church
- Dedication: Saint Peter

Architecture
- Functional status: Active

Administration
- Province: Canterbury
- Diocese: St Albans
- Archdeaconry: Bedford
- Deanery: Ampthill and Shefford

Clergy
- Vicar: Steve Nuth

Church of St Peter is a Grade I listed church in Milton Bryan, Bedfordshire, England. It became a listed building on 23 January 1961.

== History ==
St Peter's has Norman origins, its history can be traced back to the 11th century. Its construction was originally of a more simplistic nature, consisting of only a nave, chancel, bell-cot and a wooden porch. After changes in the 14th and 17th centuries, the building also exhibits both north and south transepts, a tower and a stained-glass window dedicated to Joseph Paxton. The church also features the 'Inglis Chapel', deriving its namesake from the Inglis family; Hugh Inglis (a former Baron of Milton Bryan) made significant repairs and additions to the building during the 1800s and selected Robert Smirke as the architect.

== Activity ==
The church maintains regular services, including Holy Communion, alongside community events such as jumble sales and 'Café Church' where refreshments are provided for an optional donation.

== See also ==
- Grade I listed buildings in Bedfordshire
