= Church of St Mary, Linslade =

Church in Bedfordshire, England

Coordinates: 51.9324°N 0.6776°W

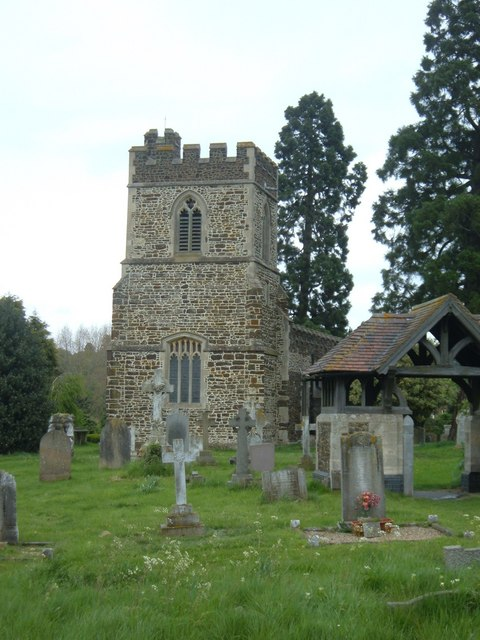
St Mary's church

Church of St Mary is a Grade I listed church in Linslade, Bedfordshire, England. It became a listed building on 20 February 1954.

== History ==
=== Pre-16th Century ===
Pilgrims were originally attracted to a holy well on the site during the 10th century. The first church was built in the 12th century, though was rebuilt in the 15th century into the form it is today.

=== 19th Century ===
In the 19th century, the canal and railway revolutions meant those living in Old Linslade moved to the current area of Linslade, adjoined with Leighton Buzzard.

In 1868, the bells from the Church of St Mary were moved to St Barnabas in Linslade upon completion of its tower.

The south porch of the church dates from restorations made in the 19th century.

=== 20th Century ===
On 20 February 1954 the church became a Grade I listed building.

=== 21st Century ===
In the late 2010s a wooden toilet block was installed on the site, situated close to the wall of the south-east facing side of the church. It is a separate structure from the church itself.

== Architecture ==
The church consists of a chancel, nave, west tower and south porch.

The chancel is 24 feet long by 12 feet. The nave adds around 45 feet in length and 19 feet in width. The tower is around 35 feet high, the base being 10 feet by 11 feet wide.

=== Porch and Doorways ===
The outer doorway is under a square head with quatrefoil designs in the spandrels. The south doorway under the porch, leading into the church, dates from the 15th century. In the east wall of the porch is a holy water stoup, dating from the 16th century. A doorway on the north side of the church is blocked, likely in restorations around 1897–8. In restorations during 1876 the north doorway was in use and given a porch.

=== Tower and Bells ===
A semi-octagonal stair turret can be accessed from inside the church, leading up the west tower's north-east corner. In 1868, the original bells were transferred to St Barnabas in Linslade upon completion of the church's tower, leaving only one bell in the Church of St Mary.

== Surrounding area ==
The church site is situated less than 100 metres from the Grand Union Canal, which was built around it due to the site being on slightly higher ground. The nearest pub, The Globe Inn, is around 500 metres south-east, and can be easily reached from the church by following the canal. The site is less than 2 km from the 400 acre (160ha) Rushmere Country Parks of Heath and Reach to the north, and a similar distance from Leighton Buzzard High Street to the south-east.

== See also ==
- Grade I listed buildings in Bedfordshire
