= Church of St Peter, Sharnbrook =

Church in Bedfordshire, England

Coordinates: 52.2256°N 0.5468°W

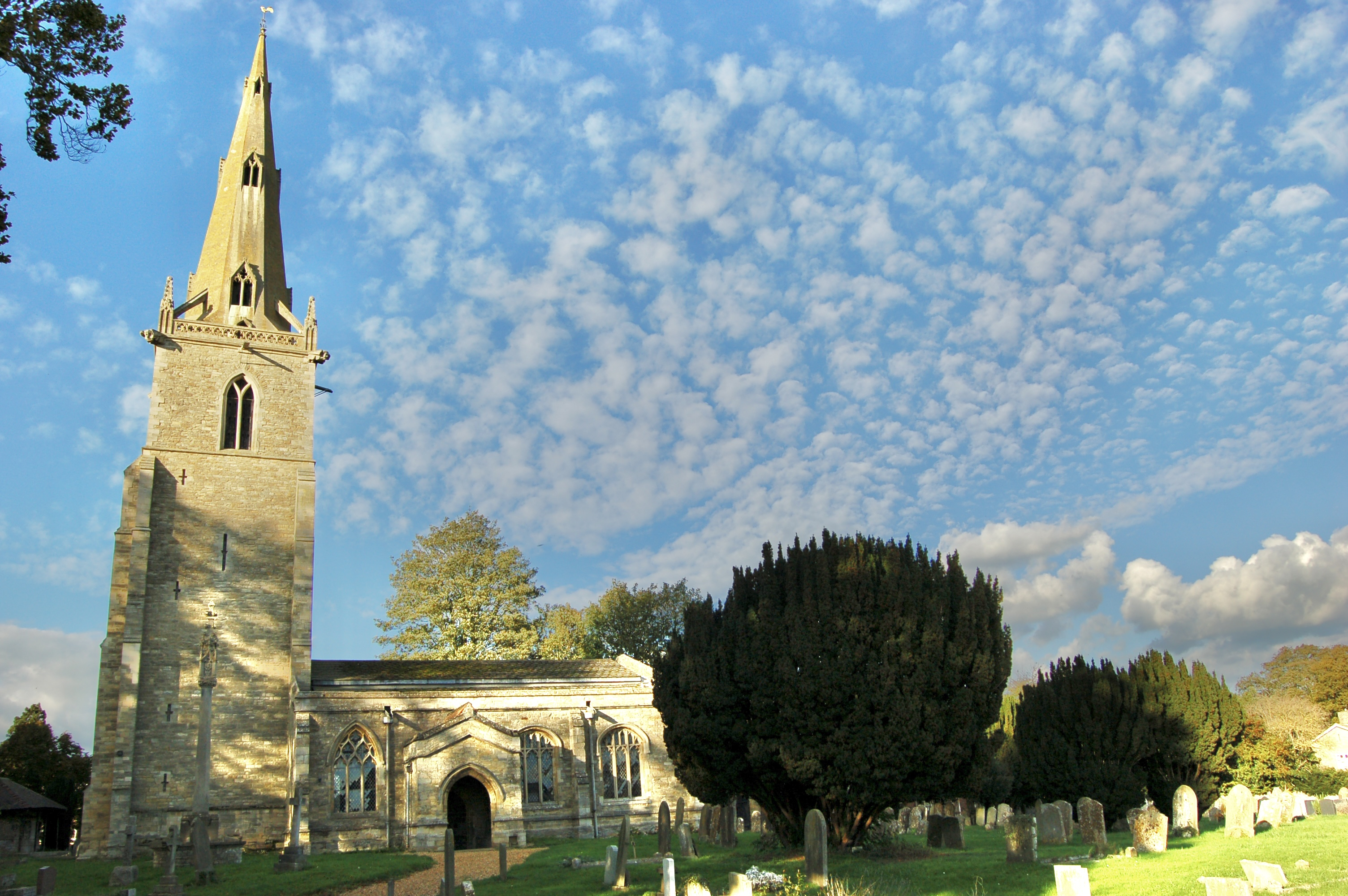
Church of St Peter, Sharnbrook

Church of St Peter is a Grade I listed church in Sharnbrook, Bedfordshire, England. It became a listed building on 13 July 1964. The parish church is dedicated to Saint Peter. It is of Gothic architecture style, with a tower and spire. Its interior is decorated with monuments. A hand-tinted aquatint of 'Sharnbrook Church, Bedfordshire' was drawn, engraved and published by Thomas Fisher on 4 November 1812.

== See also ==
- Grade I listed buildings in Bedfordshire
