= Church of St Mary the Virgin, Henlow =

Grade I listed church in Bedfordshire, England

Coordinates: 52.0347°N 0.2839°W

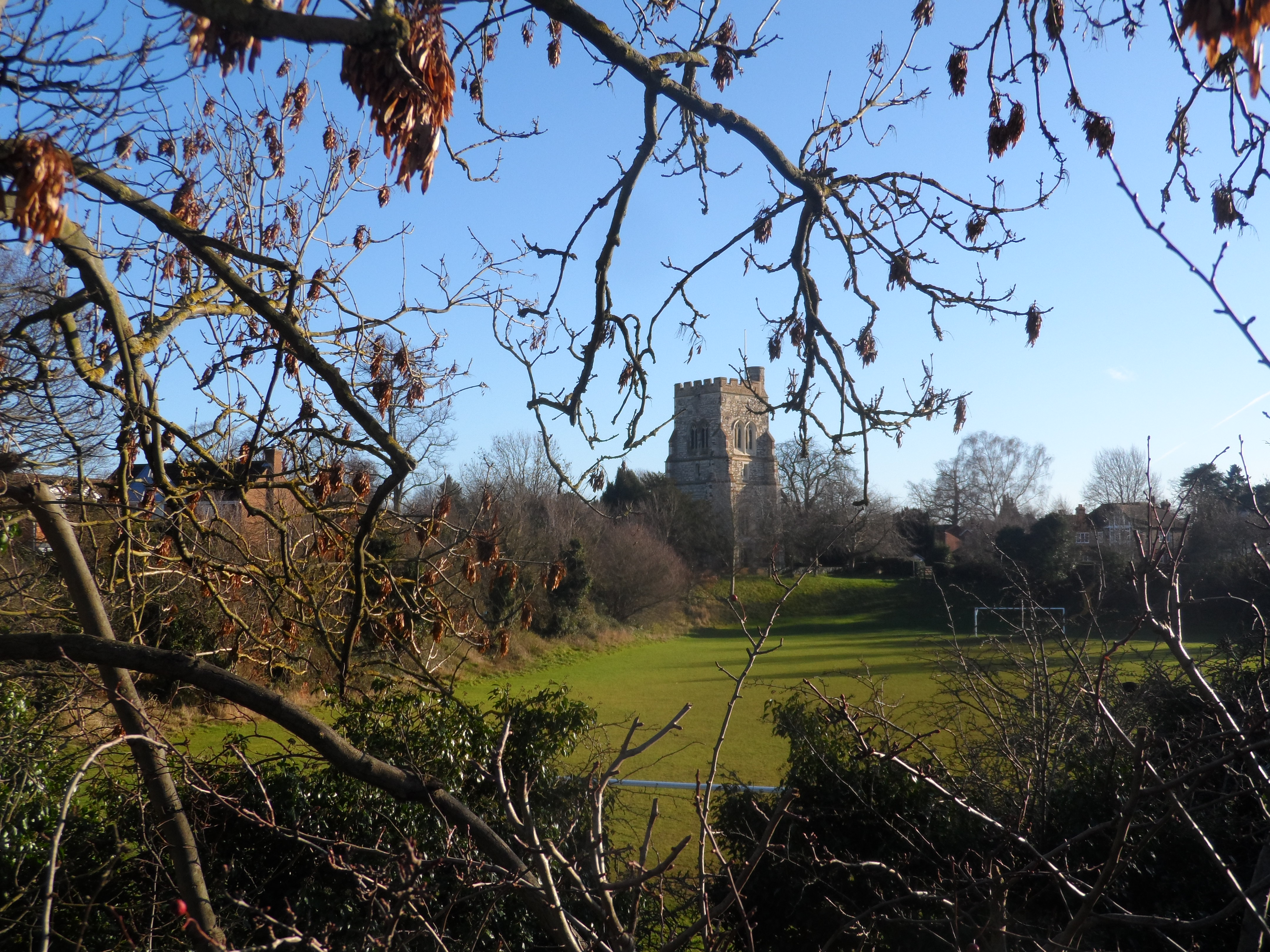
St Marys, Henlow

Church of St Mary the Virgin is a Grade I listed church in Henlow, Bedfordshire, England. It became a listed building on 31 October 1966. The original footprint of the church dates back to the 12th century, but the current building dates mostly from the 15th century. The church is mostly in a Perpendicular style, with a myriad of monuments and stained glass windows and a three-stage tower, which was added in the 15th century. The tower housed five bells, which were cast in 1628. Although the number of bells was increased to eight in the 20th century, the nearby house still retains its name of The Five Bells.

Originally the nave was aisleless and shorter than it is now (48 feet (15 m)). The north and south aisles were added around the 14th/15th centuries, as was the chancel, whereas the porch is entirely modern.

Records show that the church (and the village) have a connection with the Pilgrim Fathers; at least three residents, Edward and Ann Tilley, and John and Joan Tilley. Both women died in the first winter. they took one of their nephews, Henry Samson, with them. Samson was baptized in St Mary's.

The cemetery is listed with the Commonwealth War Graves Commission as it has at least 20 graves containing the dead from both the First and Second World Wars.

== See also ==
- Grade I listed buildings in Bedfordshire
