= Church of St Peter & St Paul, Cranfield =

Church in Bedfordshire, England

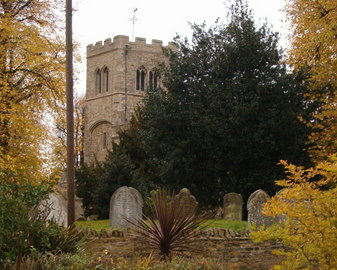
Cranfield Church in November 2006

Church of St Peter & St Paul is a Grade I listed church in Cranfield, Bedfordshire, England. It became a listed building on 23 January 1961.

== See also ==
- Grade I listed buildings in Bedfordshire
