= All Saints Church, Turvey =

Church in Bedfordshire, England

All Saints Church
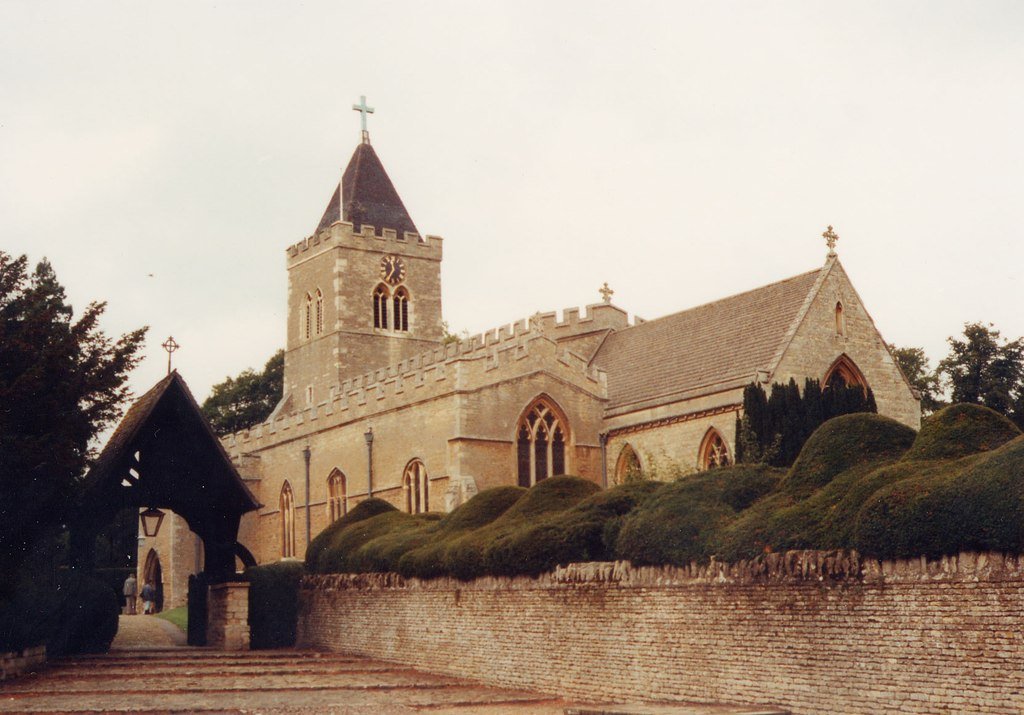
- All Saints Church
- 52.16321°N 0.62661°W
- Location: Turvey, Bedfordshire
- Country: England
- Denomination: Church of England
- Website: All Saints Church, Turvey

Administration
- Diocese: St Albans
- Deanery: Sharnbrook

All Saints Church, Turvey is a Grade I listed parish church in Turvey, Bedfordshire, England. The church originated in the Saxon period, and was largely rebuilt in the 13th century with later additions in the 14th and 15th centuries. It was extensively restored and the chancel rebuilt in the mid-19th century by the architect George Gilbert Scott, who rebuilt the chancel. There are surviving Saxon features in the nave and the tower.

== History ==
All Saints Church has late Saxon origins and was built on the site of an earlier church. Saxon fabric survives in the nave and tower, including round window openings. The church was developed over several centuries. The nave and south aisle are largely 13th-century, with further work in the 14th century including the addition of the north arcade. In the 15th century the building was altered again, when a clerestory was added and the nave roof renewed. The south porch dates from the 13th century and its height was raised in the 15th century.

The church was extensively restored and extended eastwards between 1852 and 1854 by the architect George Gilbert Scott, who rebuilt the chancel and added associated structures.

== Architecture ==
=== Structure ===
The church is built of stone, The plan consists of a nave, chancel, north and south aisles, a south porch, and a west tower. The lower parts of the tower and sections of the nave retain Saxon features. The nave is mainly 13th-century, with a north arcade added in the early 14th century. A clerestory was installed in the 15th century. The chancel was rebuilt in the mid-19th century during the restoration by Scott.

The tower rises in stages, with work of the 13th and 15th centuries, and is topped by a parapet and pyramid roof added in the 19th century. The west doorway retains 13th-century ironwork attributed to a local craftsman, sometimes identified as John of Leighton.

=== Interior ===
The interior retains features from several periods. The nave has arcades separating it from the aisles, and the roof, dating from the 15th century, is decorated with carved bosses and figures of angels. High in the nave walls are blocked openings from earlier phases of the building, including Saxon windows.

The south aisle includes a Lady Chapel at its eastern end. A wall painting of the Crucifixion, dating from the 13th or early 14th century, survives and was uncovered during 19th-century restoration work. The chapel also contains a rare set of trefoiled sedilia, with three seats for the priest, deacon, and sub-deacon, and a smaller piscina for washing sacred vessels.

=== Furnishings, fittings and monuments ===
The church contains a number of historic fittings, including a late Norman font dating from about 1200. The interior also retains choir stalls and other furnishings from later periods, along with a 19th-century bier used for funerals.

There is an extensive collection of monuments, particularly to the Mordaunt family, who were associated with Turvey for several centuries. The earliest is a tomb chest to Sir John Mordaunt (died 1506) in the south aisle. Other notable monuments include that of John, 1st Baron Mordaunt (died 1560), an elaborate, two-tiered monument with alabaster effigies and classical detailing, and later monuments to successive members of the family, including those dated 1571 and 1601.

=== Glass ===
The church contains mainly Victorian stained glass, much of it installed during the 19th-century restoration. The windows include both figurative and patterned designs, with different schemes used in the chancel, aisles, and Lady Chapel.

== See also ==
- Grade I listed buildings in Bedfordshire
