= Church of St Margaret, Streatley, Bedfordshire =

Coordinates: 51.9457°N 0.4444°W

Church of St Margaret
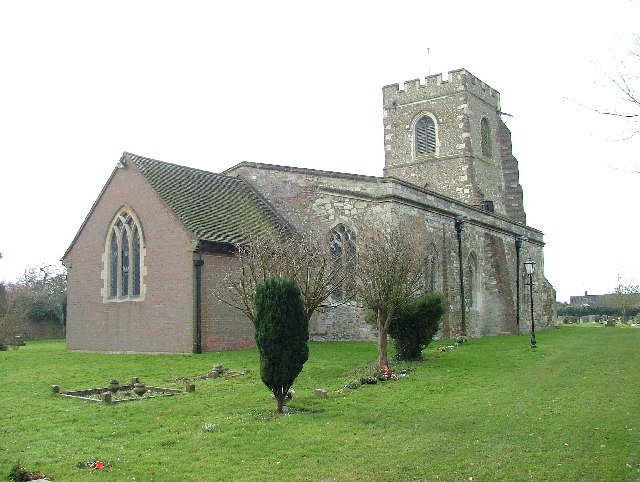
- Church of St Margaret
- Country: England
- Denomination: Church of England
- Website: www.stmargarets-streatley.uk

History
- Status: Parish church

Architecture
- Functional status: Active

Administration
- Province: Canterbury
- Diocese: St Albans
- Archdeaconry: Bedford
- Deanery: Luton

Clergy
- Vicar: The Revd N Richards

Church of St Margaret is a Grade I listed church in Streatley, Bedfordshire, England. It became a listed building on 3 February 1967.

Francis Proctor, a liturgical historian, served as the church's curate from 1836 until 1840.

== See also ==
- Grade I listed buildings in Bedfordshire
