= Church of St Mary, Carlton, Bedfordshire =

Church in Carlton, Bedfordshire, England

Coordinates: 52.184139°N 0.608678°W

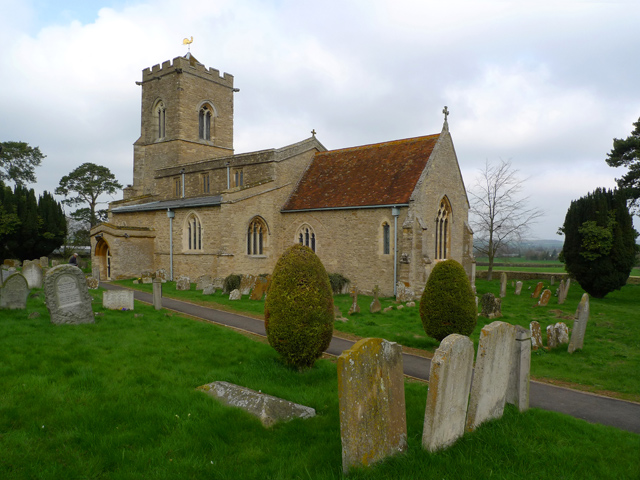

Church of St Mary is a Grade I listed church in Carlton, Bedfordshire, England.

== See also ==
- Grade I listed buildings in Bedfordshire
