= Church of St John the Baptist, Stanbridge, Bedfordshire =

Church in Bedfordshire, England

Coordinates: 51.9082°N 0.5976°W

Church of St John the Baptist
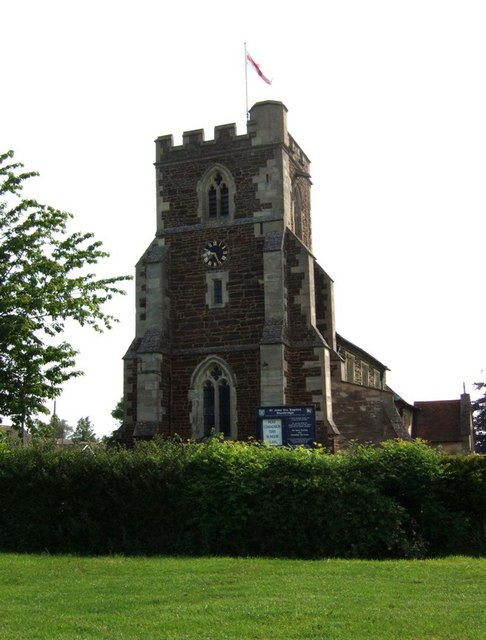
- Parish church of St John the Baptist, Stanbridge, Bedfordshire, seen from west-southwest

Church of St John the Baptist is a Grade I listed church in Stanbridge, Bedfordshire, England. It became a listed building on 3 February 1967.

== See also ==
- Grade I listed buildings in Bedfordshire
