= Church of St James, Biddenham =

Church in Bedfordshire, England

Coordinates: 52.1384°N 0.5197°W

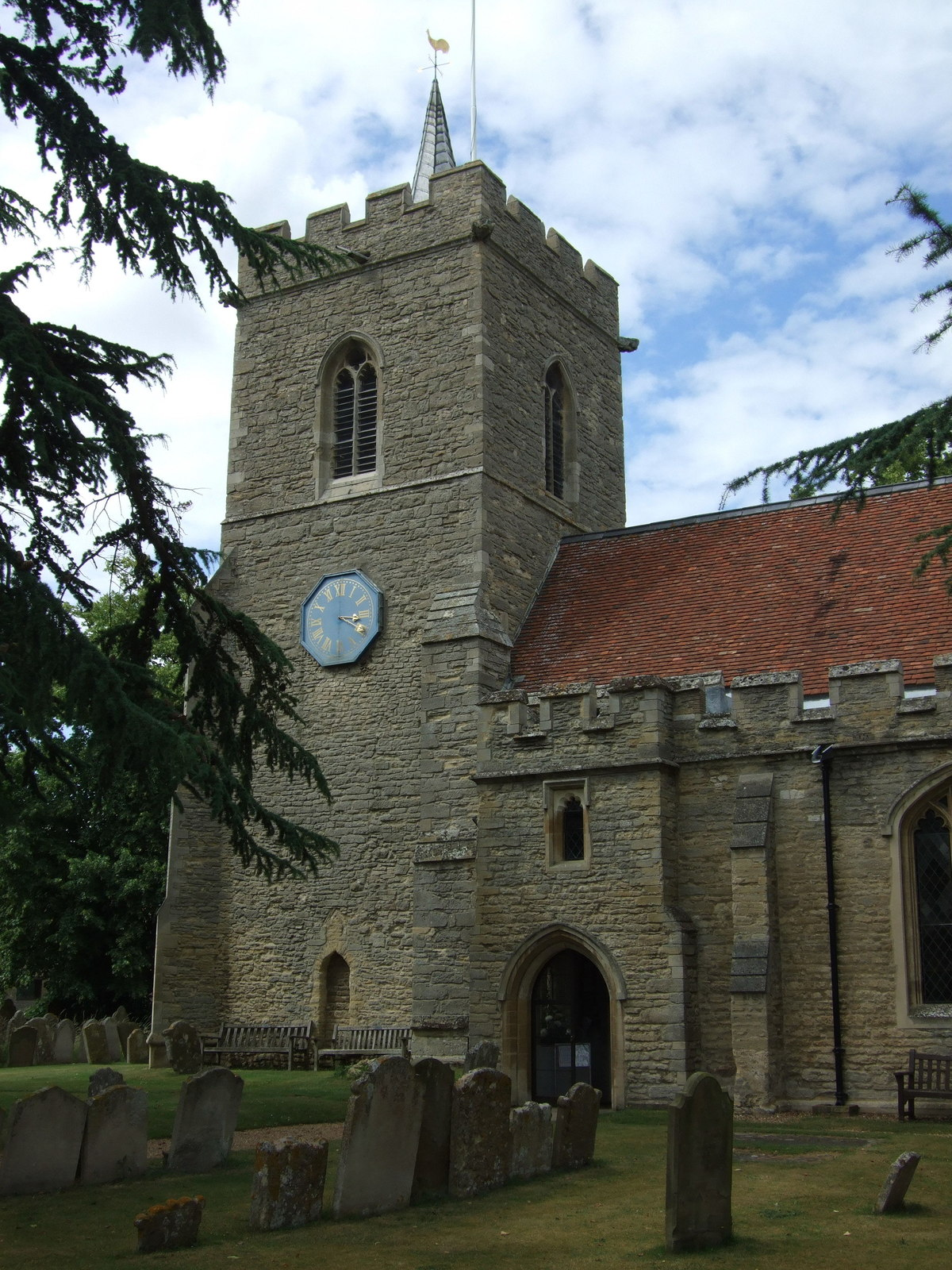
St James Church

Church of St James is a Grade I listed church in Biddenham, Bedfordshire, England. It became a listed building on 13 July 1964. The Church has a website.

== History ==
The Christian church was built around the 11th or 12th century. The tower was completed in the 15th century, with multiple architectural additions to the church between the two dates.

Until 1939, a Jacobean screen in the north aisle was moved to separate the nave and the south aisle.

In 1960, a modern stained glass window was installed in the north aisle.

In 1964, the church achieved a Grade I listed status.

Millennium celebrations were commemorated with the installation of a modern stained glass window in the west window.

== See also ==
- Grade I listed buildings in Bedfordshire
