= Church of All Saints, Tilsworth =

Church in Bedfordshire, England

Coordinates: 51.9085°N 0.5838°W

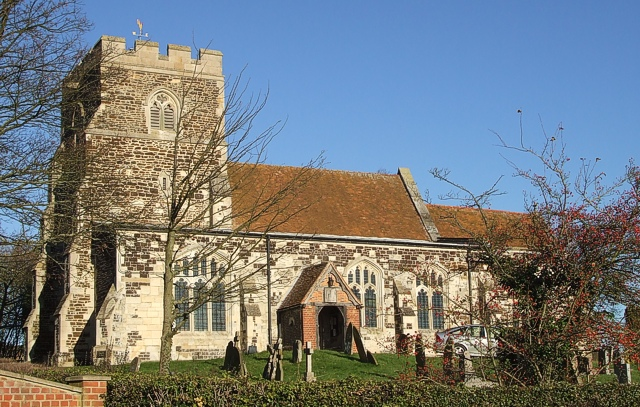
Shot of the church

Church of All Saints is a Grade I listed church in Tilsworth, Bedfordshire, England. It became a listed building on 3 February 1967.

== See also ==
- Grade I listed buildings in Bedfordshire
