= Church of St Peter, Arlesey =

Church in Arlesey, Bedfordshire, England

Coordinates: 52.0235°N 0.2642°W

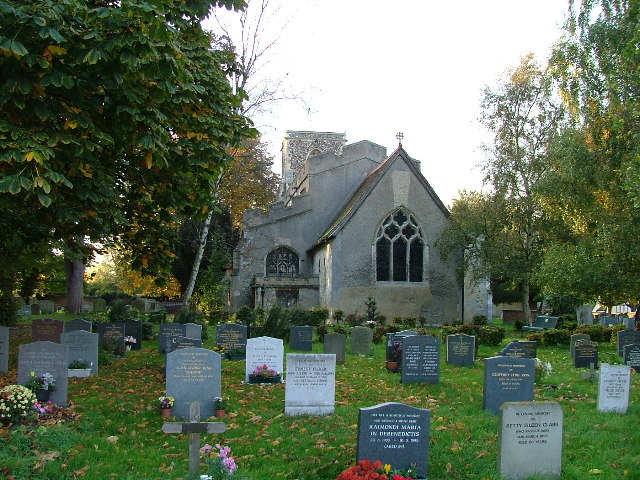

Church of St Peter is a Grade I listed church in Arlesey, Bedfordshire, England. It became a listed building on 31 October 1966.

== See also ==
- Grade I listed buildings in Bedfordshire

== History ==
Internal evidence dates the church to originally be from the 12th century, as only a nave. Aisles were later added in the 13th and 14th centuries.

In the 1600s, the original tower collapsed and was replaced by a small wooden belfry for many years.

A nearby building that used to serve as a vestry, chapel and school was demolished in 1855 and replaced by the current vestry.

The current replacement tower was built in 1877.

== Architecture ==
The nave is 64 feet long by 17 feet wide. The chancel adds 16 feet in length with a width of 26 feet. The two aisles add around 10 ft each. The modern tower is around 12 feet square.
