= Church of St Mary the Virgin, Salford, Bedfordshire =

Church in Salford, Bedfordshire, England

Coordinates: 52.0424°N 0.6368°W

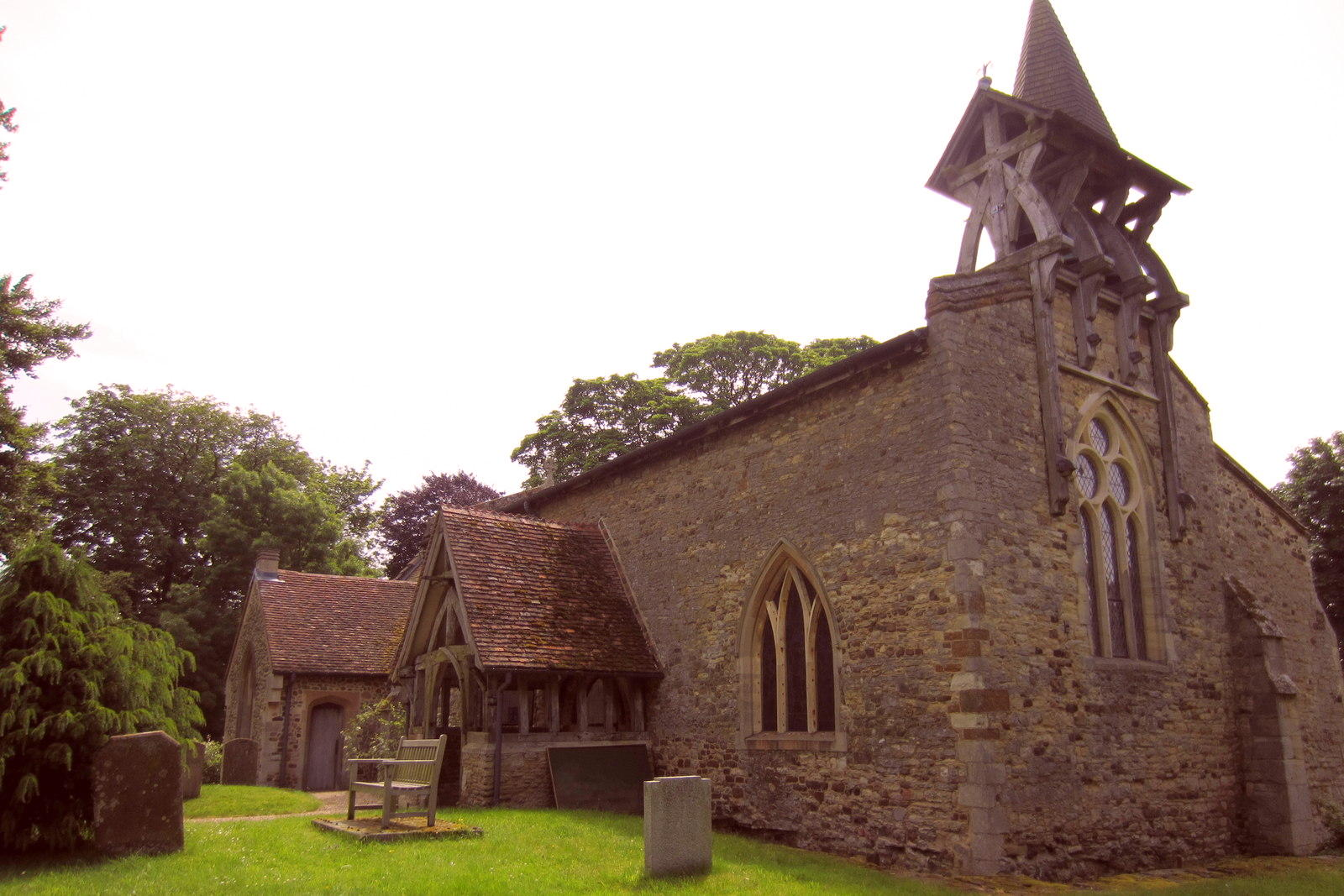
St Mary the Virgin church

Church of St Mary the Virgin is a Grade I listed church in Salford, Bedfordshire, England. It is still standing in 2024.

== See also ==
- Grade I listed buildings in Bedfordshire
