= Church of St Nicholas, Wilden, Bedfordshire =

Place of worship in Bedfordshire, England

Coordinates: 52.1845°N 0.4011°W

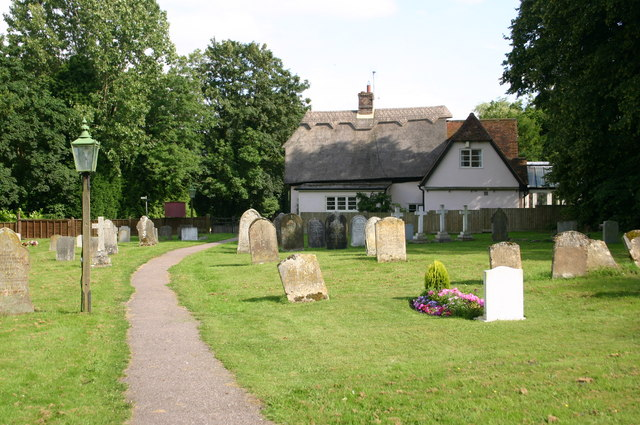

Church of St Nicholas is the parish church of Wilden, Bedfordshire, England, in the Diocese of St Albans. It became a Grade I listed building on 13 July 1964.

== Layout and history ==
The church stands in the middle of the village to the south of High Street. It consists of a plain nave and chancel, about 86 foot (26 m) long and 15–20 foot (4.6–6.0 m) wide. It has a south porch, a vestry on the north-east side, and a nine-foot (2.7 m) square west tower about 55 foot (17 m) high in three stages.

The current building dates mainly from 15th century, but an earlier building on the site appears in a small part of the south wall, dating from the 14th century. The church is built of cobblestone, with some ashlar dressing on the buttresses.

The church holds Sunday services at 10.30 am or 6 pm, more or less alternately.

== See also ==
- Grade I listed buildings in Bedfordshire
- St Nicholas Church website
