= Church of St Thomas of Canterbury, Clapham, Bedfordshire =

Historic church in Bedfordshire, England

Coordinates: 52.1609°N 0.4898°W

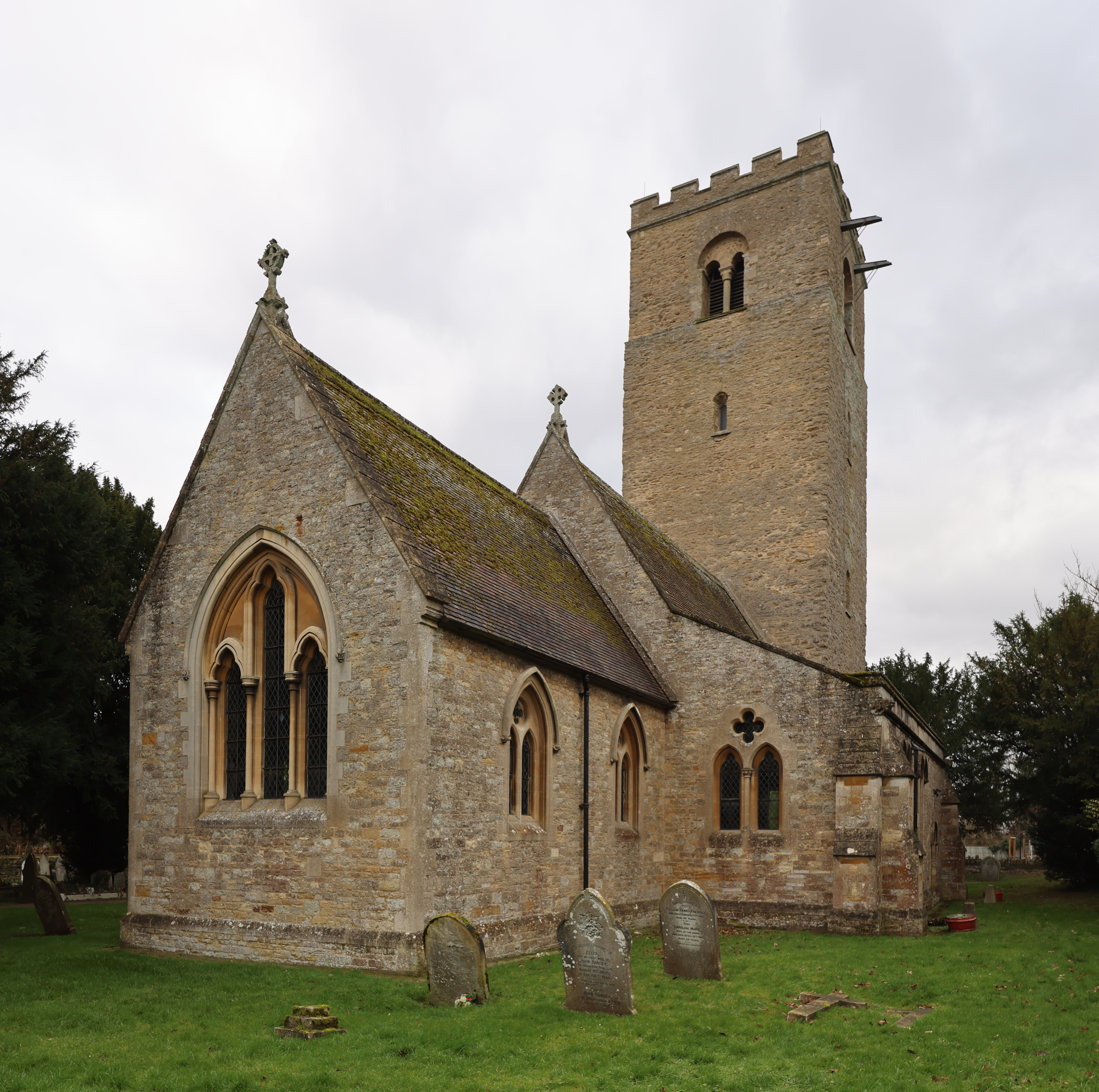
St Thomas' in 2025

Church of St Thomas of Canterbury (also Clapham Parish Church, or Thomas à Becket) is a parish church and Grade I listed building in Clapham, Bedfordshire, England. It became a listed building on 13 July 1964. Though the church can be traced back before AD 1000, there is no record of the original patron saint, Thomas Becket having been so well accepted. The church is built in the Anglo-Saxon style, possibly early 10th century. There are narrow semi-circular-headed windows. The upper story is Early Norman. The parapet is 17th century. The remainder of the church was entirely rebuilt in 1861, by Sir George Gilbert Scott. It features a chancel, nave, and two aisles.

== Church tower ==
The church tower, which dates to the 11th or 12th century, measures 26 metres (85 ft) in height and houses 5 bells, which are still occasionally used for weddings and ceremonies. The tower is widely recognised as one of the best and most remarkable remaining examples of Early Saxon architectural work in England.

== Leadership ==
As of 2026, St Thomas' current vicar is the Reverend Stephen Liley, who has served there since 2002. In 2017, he was appointed as an Honorary Canon of St Albans Cathedral.

== See also ==
- Grade I listed buildings in Bedfordshire
