= Church of St Andrew, Langford, Bedfordshire =

Church in Langford, Bedfordshire, England

Coordinates: 52.0584°N 0.2719°W

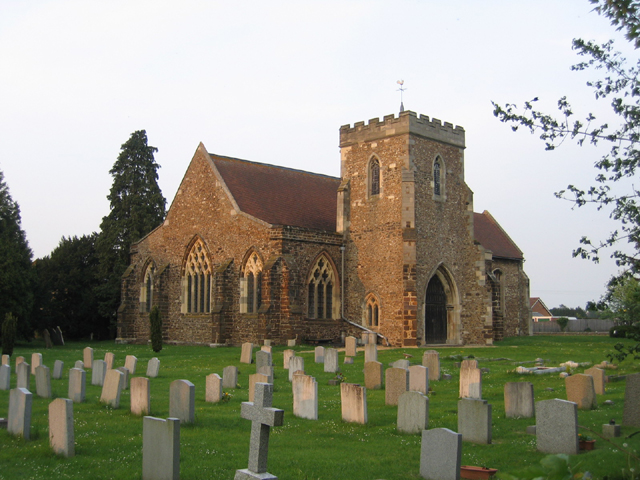

Church of St Andrew is a Grade I listed church in Langford, Bedfordshire, England. It became a listed building on 31 October 1966.

The three bells, the oldest of which dates back to 1772, are housed in their original wooden frame. The wheels have been replaced by a lever mechanism enabling them to be chimed but not rung.

== See also ==
- Grade I listed buildings in Bedfordshire
