= All Saints' Church, Renhold =

Church in Renhold, Bedfordshire, England

Coordinates: 52.1632°N 0.4095°W

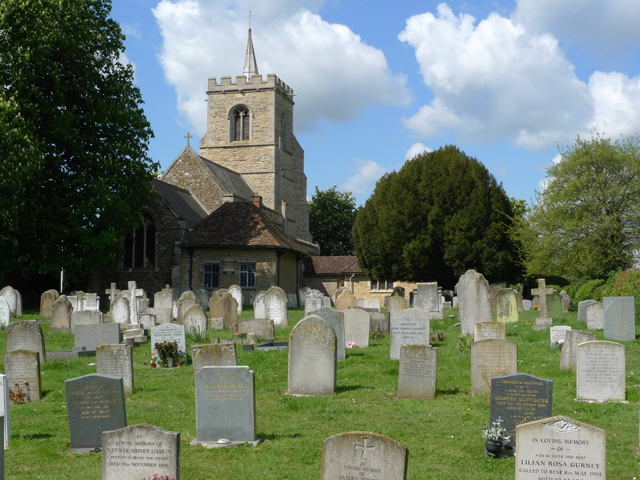
Church of All Saints, Renhold

Church of All Saints is a Grade I listed church in Renhold, Bedfordshire, England. It became a listed building on 13 July 1964.

== See also ==
- Grade I listed buildings in Bedfordshire
