= Church of St Peter, Pavenham =

Church in Pavenham, Bedfordshire, England

Coordinates: 52.1929°N 0.5510°W

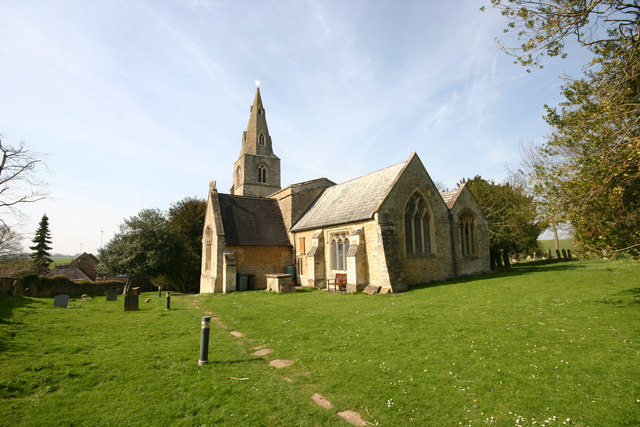

Church of St Peter is a Grade I listed church in Pavenham, Bedfordshire, England. It became a listed building on 13 July 1964.

The church has some good examples of 14th-century canopied work. The carved panelling and rich woodwork is mainly of Jacobean date; it was installed in the 19th century by Thomas Abbot Green of Pavenham Bury.

== See also ==
- Grade I listed buildings in Bedfordshire
