= Church of All Saints, Odell, Bedfordshire =

Church in Bedfordshire, England

Coordinates: 52.2118°N 0.5865°W

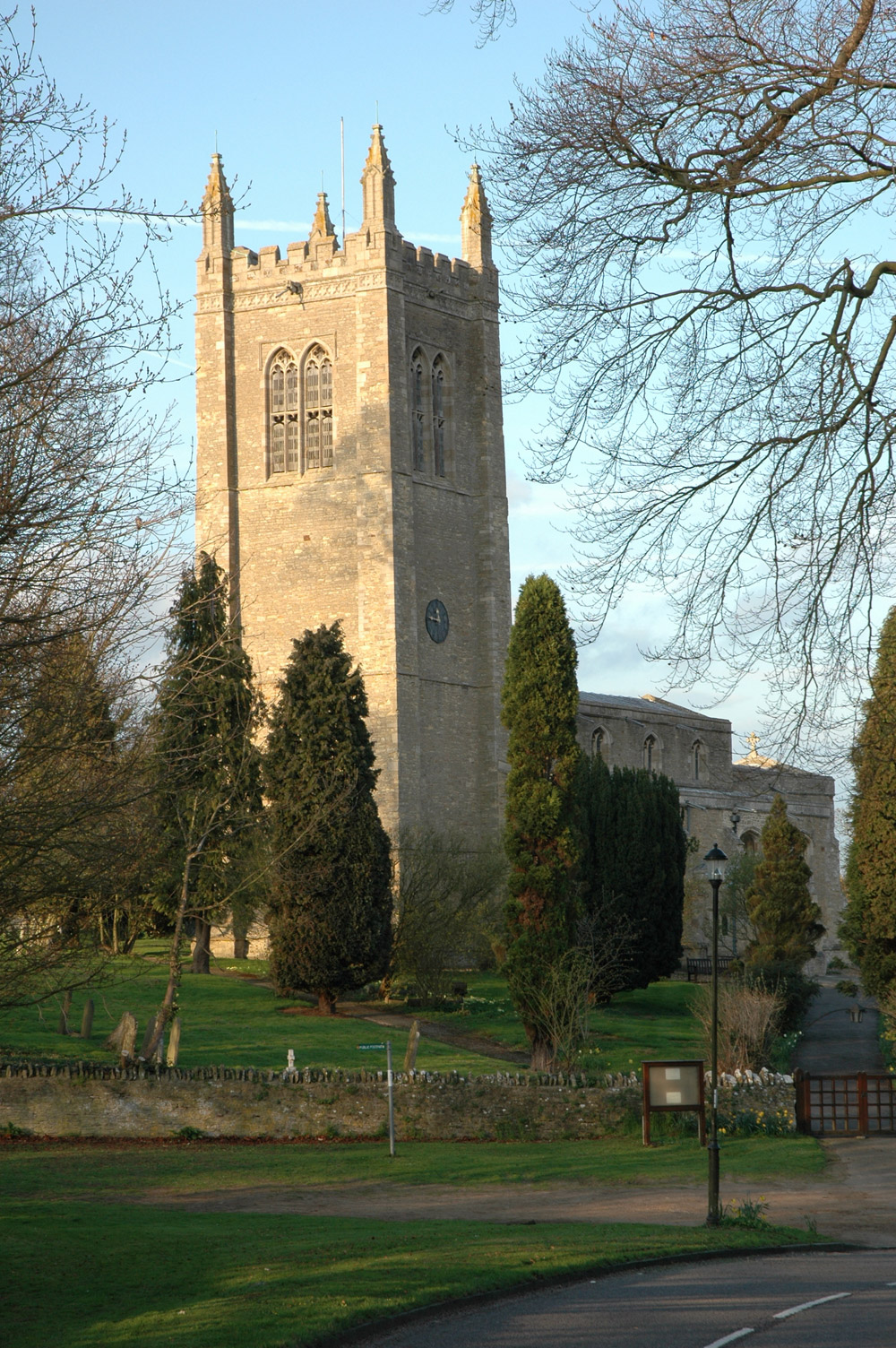

Church of All Saints is a Grade I listed church in Odell, Bedfordshire, England. It became a listed building on 13 July 1964.

The church is a fine example of a 15th-century church built all at the same time. The west tower of Northamptonshire type is massive; it has a gentle batter which relieves what would otherwise be overpowering bulk. The interior has tall arcades, an original rood screen and a diamond-patterned floor in the nave and aisles.

According to local legend, five strange marks on the church porch were left by the Devil as he tried to claim the soul of Sir Rowland Alston, who is buried in the church. It is said that Sir Rowland's ghost appears on a black horse every 100 years (those which end in the numbers -44).

== See also ==
- Grade I listed buildings in Bedfordshire
