= Church of St Mary the Virgin, Northill =

Church in Bedfordshire, England

Coordinates: 52.1054°N 0.3238°W

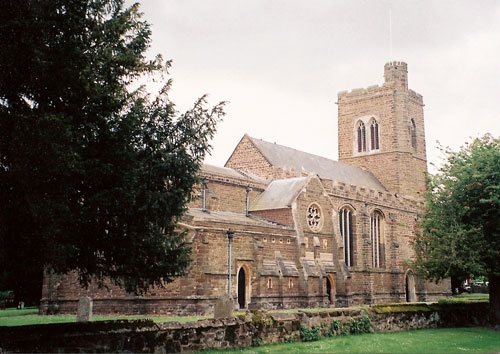

Church of St Mary the Virgin is a Grade I listed church in Northill, Bedfordshire, England. It has been listed Grade I on the National Heritage List for England since October 1966.

The church's royal arms appears on a stained glass window designed by John Oliver. It is dated 1664, and therefore the arms is that of King Charles II. The window was commissioned by the Worshipful Company of Grocers, whose own arms appears next to the royal arms.

== See also ==
- Grade I listed buildings in Bedfordshire
