= Church of All Saints, Riseley =

Church in Bedfordshire, England

Coordinates: 52.2560°N 0.4785°W

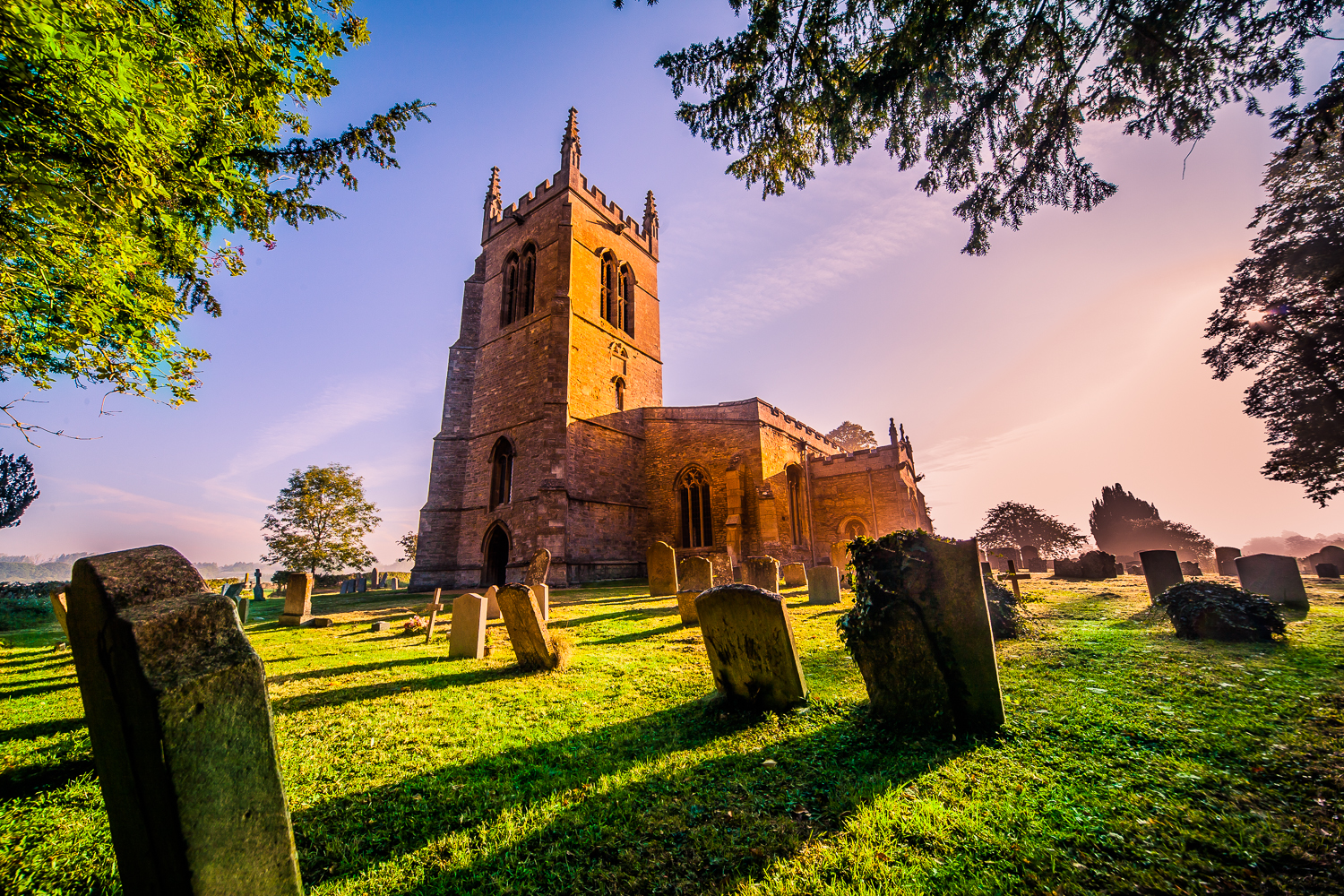
Church of All Saints in September 2013

Church of All Saints is a Grade I listed church in Riseley, Bedfordshire, England. It became a listed building on 13 July 1964.

The tower, roofs and seating are of the 15th century.

== See also ==
- Grade I listed buildings in Bedfordshire
