= Church of St Mary, Eaton Bray =

Church in Bedfordshire, England

Church of St Mary
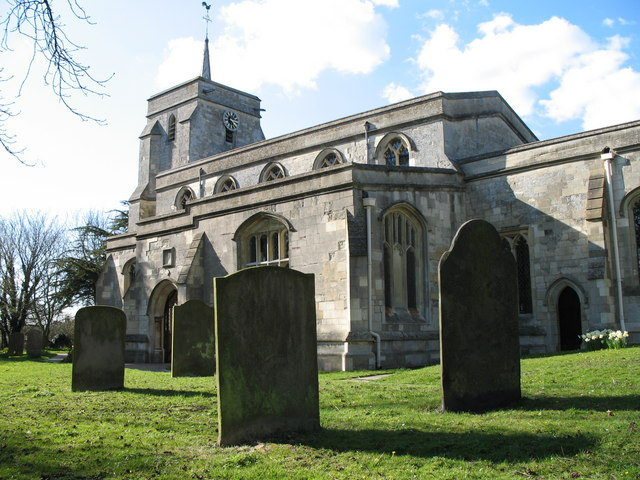
- Church of St Mary
- 51.8767°N 0.5925°W
- Location: Eaton Bray, Bedfordshire
- Country: England
- Denomination: Church of England
- Website: St Mary's, Eaton Bray

Administration
- Diocese: St Albans
- Deanery: Dunstable

The Church of St Mary is a Grade I listed parish church in Eaton Bray, Bedfordshire, England. The building dates from the 13th century, with a major renovation in the 15th century and later additions, including a north chancel chapel in the 18th century. The church was restored in the 19th century and retains medieval features along with later additions.

== History ==
St Mary’s Church dates from the 13th century, with surviving features including the south arcade of about 1220 and a later north arcade of about 1240. The church was substantially rebuilt in the 15th century, when the nave, chancel, and roof were reconstructed, a clerestory was added, and earlier windows were replaced with Perpendicular tracery.

A north chancel chapel was added in the mid-18th century. The church was restored in 1863 by E. F. Law, with further alterations in the 20th century. An organ case and gallery were installed at the west end of the nave between the First and Second World Wars.

== Architecture ==
=== Structure ===
The church is built of limestone rubble with limestone and ironstone details, and has lead roofs. It consists of a chancel, north chancel chapel, aisled nave, vestry, south porch, and a west tower.

The chancel has a three-light east window with 19th-century tracery and Perpendicular-style windows to the south. A blocked south doorway is set within a buttress. The north chapel, built of ironstone ashlar, has a round-arched east window and stands over a burial vault. The nave has north and south aisles with three-light windows. The east window of the south aisle has a central niche and brackets at the sides for sculpted figures. The south porch has a moulded doorway with a small niche above the entrance. The Lady Chapel contains decorative stonework around its east window.

The west tower has three stages, with buttresses and a battlemented top, and includes a west window, bell openings, and a stair turret on the north-east side of the tower.

=== Interior ===
The chancel has arched niches on either side of the east window, with traces of medieval wall painting. It also has a piscina and sedilia with carved stone detail. A squint connects the chancel with the south aisle, and a wide arch opens into the north chancel chapel.

The nave has north and south arcades of five bays. The north arcade dates from the 13th century and has moulded arches and carved capitals, while the south arcade is plainer. The line of the earlier 13th-century roof can be seen above the arcades, and the roof was raised in the 15th century when clerestory windows were added. The present roof is largely Perpendicular in form. The north aisle also contains a piscina and traces of medieval wall painting.

Painted corbels are visible in the nave, some of which are thought to represent figures from the 15th century; one

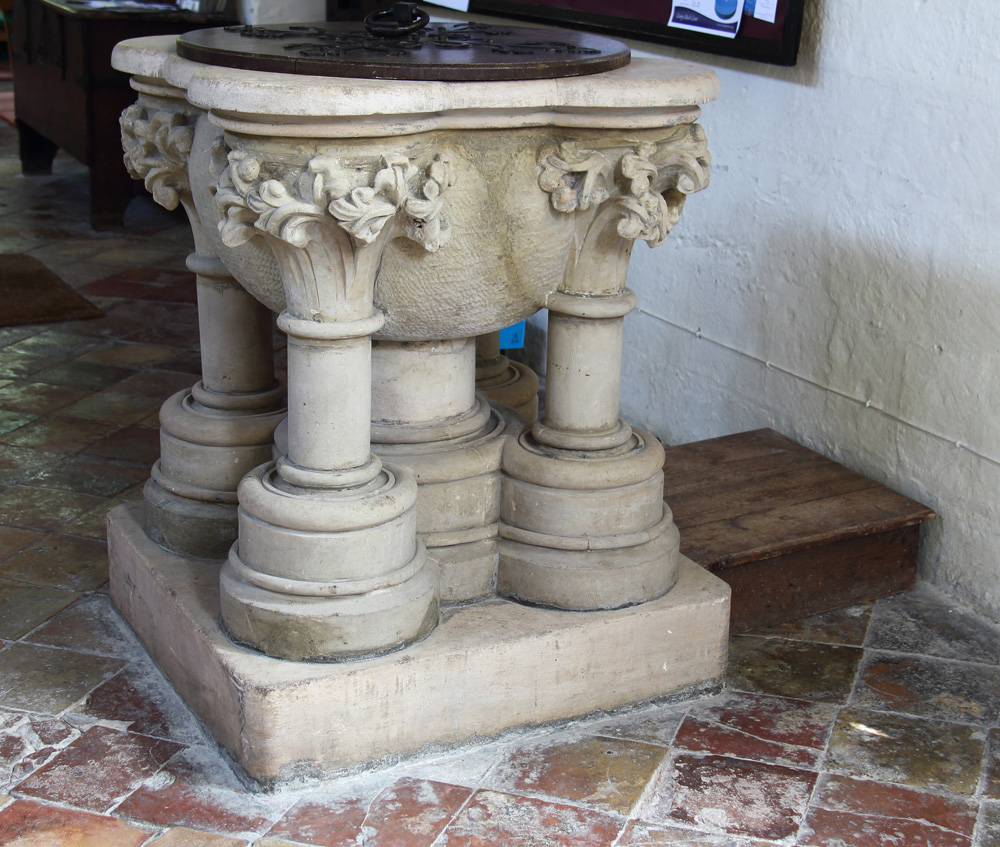
13th-century font, St Mary's Church

=== Furnishings and fittings ===
The south doorway retains late 13th-century ironwork, including ornamental scrollwork hinges, attributed to a Bedfordshire ironworker named Thomas. The east window of the Lady Chapel contains stained glass installed in 1900. Electric lighting was installed in 1928.

The font, near the south door, dates from the 13th century and has a round bowl on a central column surrounded by four smaller shafts with carved capitals. It was restored in 1855, and a wooden cover was added in 1923.

A number of 18th-century fittings survive, including box pews, a double-decker pulpit with marquetry panels and sounding board, a communion rail with twisted balusters, and a communion table dating from about 1700.

=== Monuments ===
The church has a series of monuments to the Fermor family and later earls of Pomfret. The earliest is a chest tomb with brasses to Richard Fermor (d. 1552) and his wife Anne.

Notable monuments include a late 16th-century wall monument to Sir John Fermor and his wife, and a large early 17th-century alabaster tomb to Sir George Fermor (d. 1612) and Dame Mary (d. 1628), with recumbent effigies and carved figures of their children. A marble wall monument to Sir Hatton Fermor, erected in 1662, shows standing figures of the couple. Later monuments include a white marble memorial to the 2nd Earl of Pomfret (d. 1785) and his wife, and a monument to the 3rd Earl (d. 1830). Other 19th- and 20th-century monuments to members of the Fermor and Fermor-Hesketh families are also present.

== See also ==
- Grade I listed buildings in Bedfordshire
