= Church of St Peter, Harrold, Bedfordshire =

Coordinates: 52.2000°N 0.6057°W

Church of St Peter, Harrold
- Parish church of St Peter and All Saints, Harrold, Bedfordshire
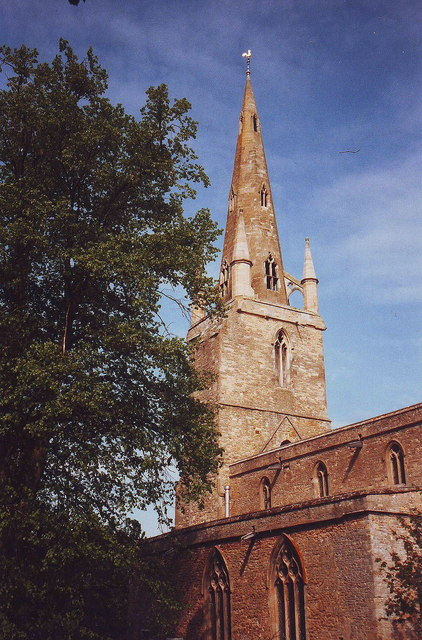
- Church of St Peter, Harrold
- Location: Harrold, Borough of Bedford, Bedfordshire, England
- Country: United Kingdom
- Denomination: Anglican

History
- Status: Parish church
- Dedication: St Peter

Architecture
- Functional status: active
- Heritage designation: Grade I listed
- Designated: 13 July 1964
- Years built: 13th–15th centuries

Administration
- Diocese: Diocese of St Albans

Listed Building – Grade I
- Official name: Parish church of St Peter
- Designated: 13 July 1964
- Reference no.: 1321537

Church of St Peter is a Grade I listed church in Harrold, Bedfordshire, England.

== See also ==
- Grade I listed buildings in Bedfordshire
