= Church of St Mary the Virgin, Wootton, Bedfordshire =

Church in Bedfordshire, England

Coordinates: 52.0949°N 0.5362°W

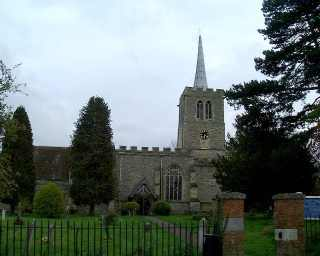
Church of St Mary the Virgin, Wootton

Church of St Mary the Virgin is a Grade I listed church in Wootton, Bedfordshire, England. It became a listed building on July 13, 1964.

The church is a member of the Evangelical Alliance and its Vicar is The Reverend Canon Doctor Peter Ackroyd.

== See also ==
- Grade I listed buildings in Bedfordshire
