= Stevington =

Village in Bedfordshire, England

Coordinates: 52.169°N 0.555°W

- Location within Bedfordshire
- Population: 552 (2011 Census)
- OS grid reference: SP992535
- Unitary authority: Bedford
- Ceremonial county: Bedfordshire
- Region: East
- Country: England
- Sovereign state: United Kingdom
- Post town: BEDFORD
- Postcode district: MK43
- Dialling code: 01234
- Police: Bedfordshire
- Fire: Bedfordshire
- Ambulance: East of England
- UK Parliament: North Bedfordshire

Stevington is a village and civil parish in the Borough of Bedford in northern Bedfordshire, England. It is on the River Great Ouse four to five miles northwest of Bedford. Nearby villages include Bromham, Oakley, Pavenham and Turvey. West End lies northwest of the village, and forms part of the same civil parish.

The village has a fine Medieval Church as well as a number of listed buildings spanning the centuries. The first church on this site was probably a wooden building constructed during the Anglo Saxon period between 886 and 1016; this was later replaced by a stone building.

== History ==
The earliest surviving part of the present-day church is the lowest third of the tower which probably dates from the early 10th century. As the population and wealth of the village grew so too did the church buildings. This culminated in the fifteenth century with the raising of the church roof and the raising of a second stage to the tower. In 1872 the church was reopened after restoration amounting to £1927. The church has an associated holy well. The holy well is to the north of the church and has never been known to freeze or to fail in times of drought.

In the Middle Ages various miraculous powers were ascribed to the waters, particularly in respect to curing ailments of the eyes. It has been suggested by some researchers that the waters may have been the site of earlier veneration, possibly dating back to the Iron Age. The area around the well is protected as there is a proliferation of Petasites hybridus, a plant commonly known as butterbur, so named because its leaves were commonly used to wrap butter in times past.

The village appears in the Domesday Book (1086) and has been chronicled in a series of publications by the Stevington Historical Trust including Stevington, The Village History, Stevington, a Village in Pictures, Historic Walks in Stevington and a forthcoming study and book about the natural history of Stevington.

The village is also known for being the home of Kathy Brown's garden, a fine landscaped garden open to the public on a number of occasions throughout the year and designed and owned by the landscape gardener Kathy Brown. The gardens are in the grounds of the Old Manor House in Stevington.

One of England's finest examples of a 'post mill' windmill is another prominent feature of the village that can be seen clearly on entering the village from the east. The windmill is open to the public and may be accessed via a public footpath leading from Mill Farm. Keys to the windmill can be obtained from either public house The Royal George (freehouse), or The Red Lion (Greene King tied).

Stevington won the accolade of "Best Kept Village" in 1965,1969,1979 and most recently in 1985.

Stevington was a location for much non-conformist activity, prominent because it is exactly 5 miles (8 km) from Bedford, allowing Baptist activities to occur under the laws of the 17th and 18th centuries. A fine Baptist Chapel is found at the West End of the Village and it is reputed that John Bunyan preached in the field at Meeting Farm.

== Windmill ==
The mill operated commercially, mostly grinding cattle feed, until 1939. It was purchased and restored in 1951 by Bedfordshire County Council, as part of the county's contribution to the Festival of Britain.

Stevington Mill was probably the last windmill in Britain working with four common (cloth covered) sails, which were replaced in 1958 and again in 2004, the latter after a seven-year absence. The sails are turned periodically and the machinery, though requiring constant maintenance, is in rough working order.
