= Church of All Saints, Upper Dean =

Church in Bedfordshire, England

Coordinates: 52.2969°N 0.4664°W

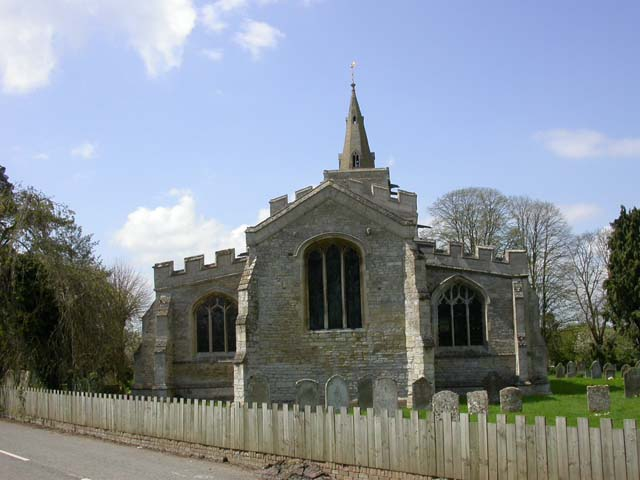
Church of All Saints (or All Hallows), Upper Dean

The Church of All Saints is a Grade I listed church in Upper Dean, Bedfordshire, England. It became a listed building on 13 July 1964.

The church escaped restoration in Victorian times and has a perfect country interior. The church was more or less rebuilt in the 15th century when only the tower and spire (14th-century) and the chancel arch (13th-century) were retained. The roofs are all 15th-century and fine specimens of that period. There are fine screens across the chancel arch and at the west ends of both chapels; the pews are old.

== See also ==
- Grade I listed buildings in Bedfordshire
