= Church of St Nicholas, Swineshead, Bedfordshire =

Church in Bedfordshire, England

Coordinates: 52.2806°N 0.4508°W

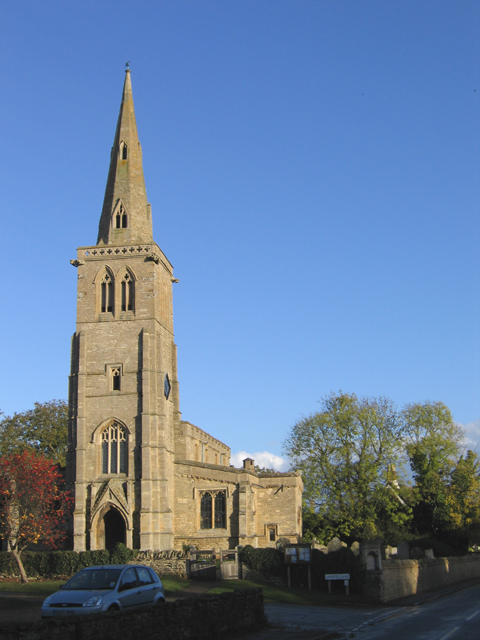
St Nicholas in 2009

Church of St Nicholas is a Grade I listed church in Swineshead, Bedfordshire, England. It became a listed building on 13 July 1964.

It is a 14th-century church with 15th-century additions. There are several frescoes and misericords.

== See also ==
- Grade I listed buildings in Bedfordshire

Media related to St Nicholas' church, Swineshead at Wikimedia Commons
