= Wilden, Bedfordshire =

Village in Bedfordshire, England

Coordinates: 52.1833°N 0.39723°W

Wilden
- Location within Bedfordshire
- Population: 399 (2011 Census)
- OS grid reference: TL096551
- Unitary authority: Bedford
- Ceremonial county: Bedfordshire
- Region: East
- Country: England
- Sovereign state: United Kingdom
- Post town: BEDFORD
- Postcode district: MK44
- Dialling code: 01234
- Police: Bedfordshire
- Fire: Bedfordshire
- Ambulance: East of England
- UK Parliament: North Bedfordshire

Wilden is a village and civil parish located in the Borough of Bedford in Bedfordshire, England. The population of 399 in the 2011 Census was estimated at 392 in 2019.

== Heritage ==
John Marius Wilson's Imperial Gazetteer of England and Wales describes Wilden as it was in 1870–1872:

"WILDEN, a parish in the district and county of Bedford; 5 miles NE of Bedford railway station. It has a post-office under Bedford. Acres, 2,160. Real property, £2,765. Population, 501. Houses, 112. The property is subdivided. The living is a rectory in the diocese of Ely. Value, £400.* Patron, Mrs. Chalk. The church is good; and there are an Independent chapel, an endowed school with £47 a year, and charities £26."

=== Famous person ===
The scholar and Bible translator Francis Dillingham died in Wilden in 1625.

== Amenities ==
The village has a 14th–15th century Grade I listed Anglican church dedicated to St Nicholas. There is a Baptist Chapel in Great Barford Road, with Sunday services held there three times a month. The chapel was probably founded in 1806, although its old Church Book has been lost.

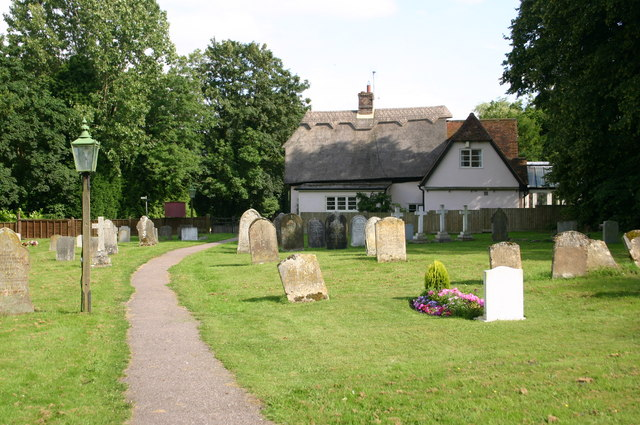
Wilden churchyard

Wilden Primary School is a Voluntary Aided Church of England school. It recently had 59 pupils, and a pre-school section for 10. It dates back to the 17th century and was rebuilt in the 19th. Additions were made in 1972, 1993, 2004 and 2013. It serves as a lower school within a group of schools called St Albans Cluster.

There are five Grade II listed buildings in the village. The single pub is called the Victoria Arms, but is now long term closed.

Wilden is served by a daytime bus service: Grant Palmer No. 27S between Bedford and Ravensden. It runs four times a day on Monday to Saturday.

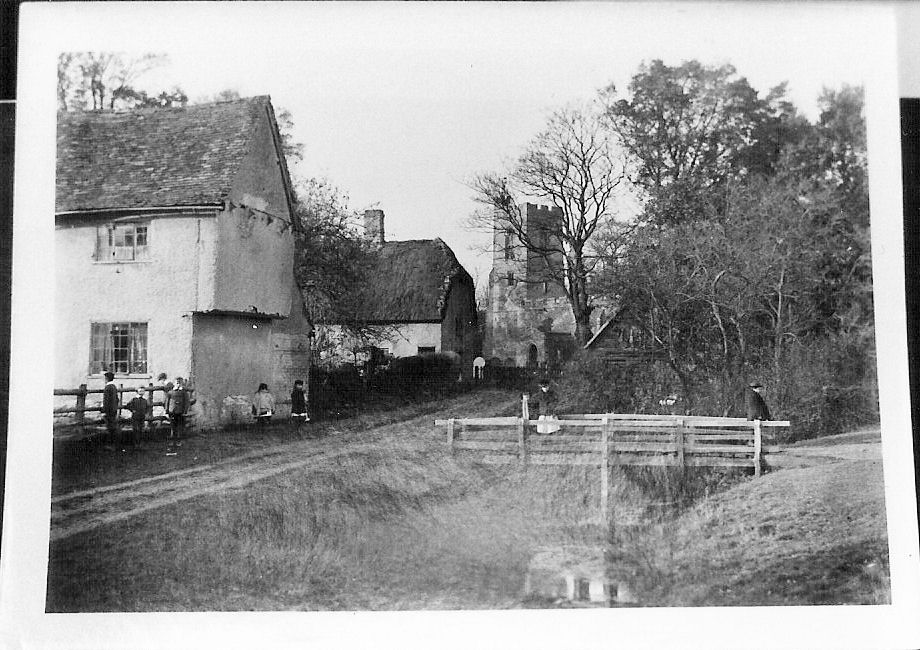
A photograph of Church Walk, Wilden, in about 1900, showing Village Farm, the Post Office (later known as Tudor Cottage), and St Nicholas Church
