= Willington Dovecote and Stables =

Grade I listed building in Bedfordshire

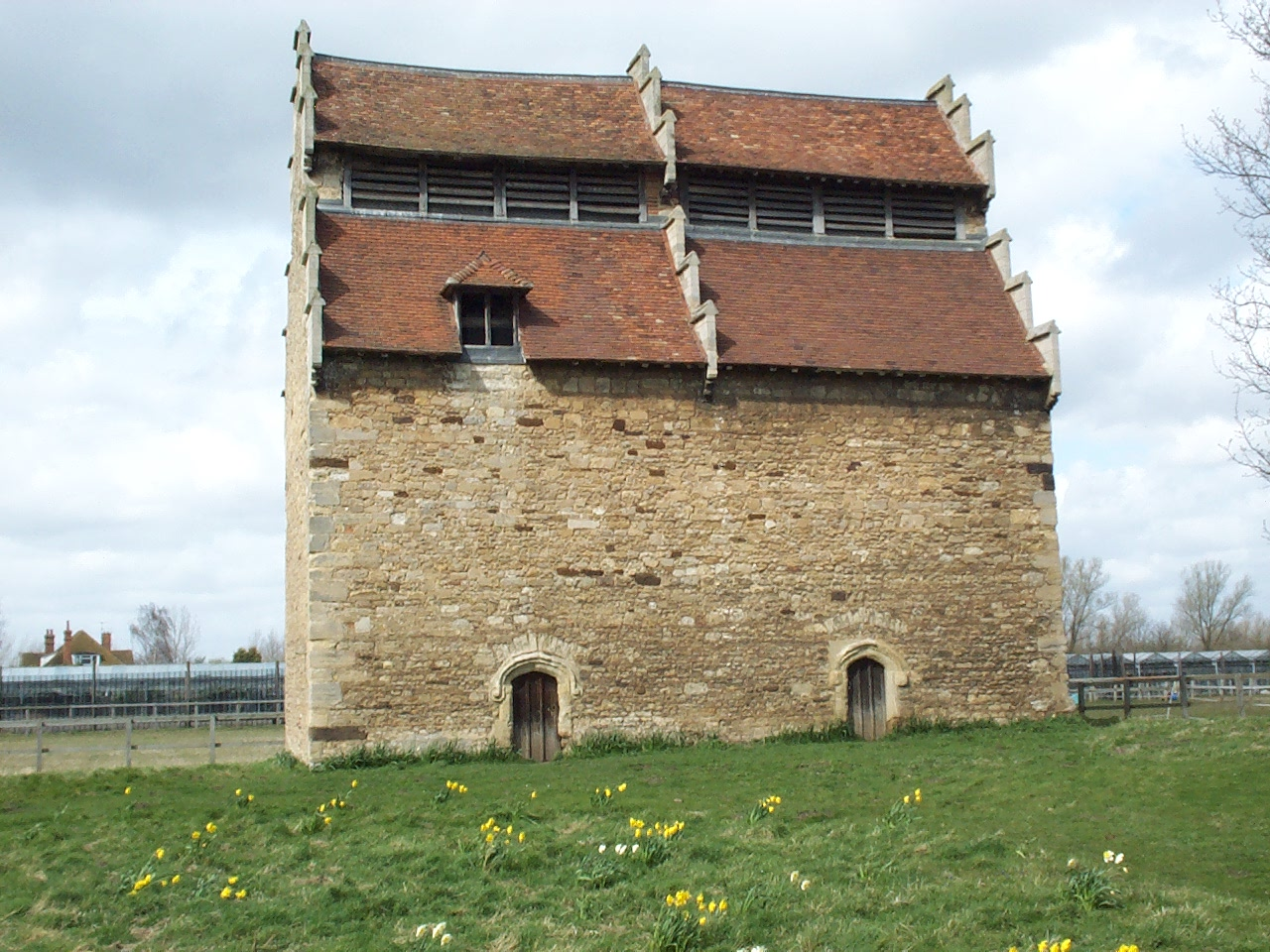
- The dovecote
- Interactive map of Willington Dovecote and Stables
- 52.136°N 0.385°W
- Type: Dovecote and stables
- Location: Willington, Bedfordshire, England

History
- Built: c. 1541
- Built for: Sir John Gostwick

Listed Building – Grade I
- Designated: 13 July 1964

Willington Dovecote & Stables is a National Trust property located in Willington, near Bedford, Bedfordshire, England. Both buildings are Grade I listed.

== Overview ==
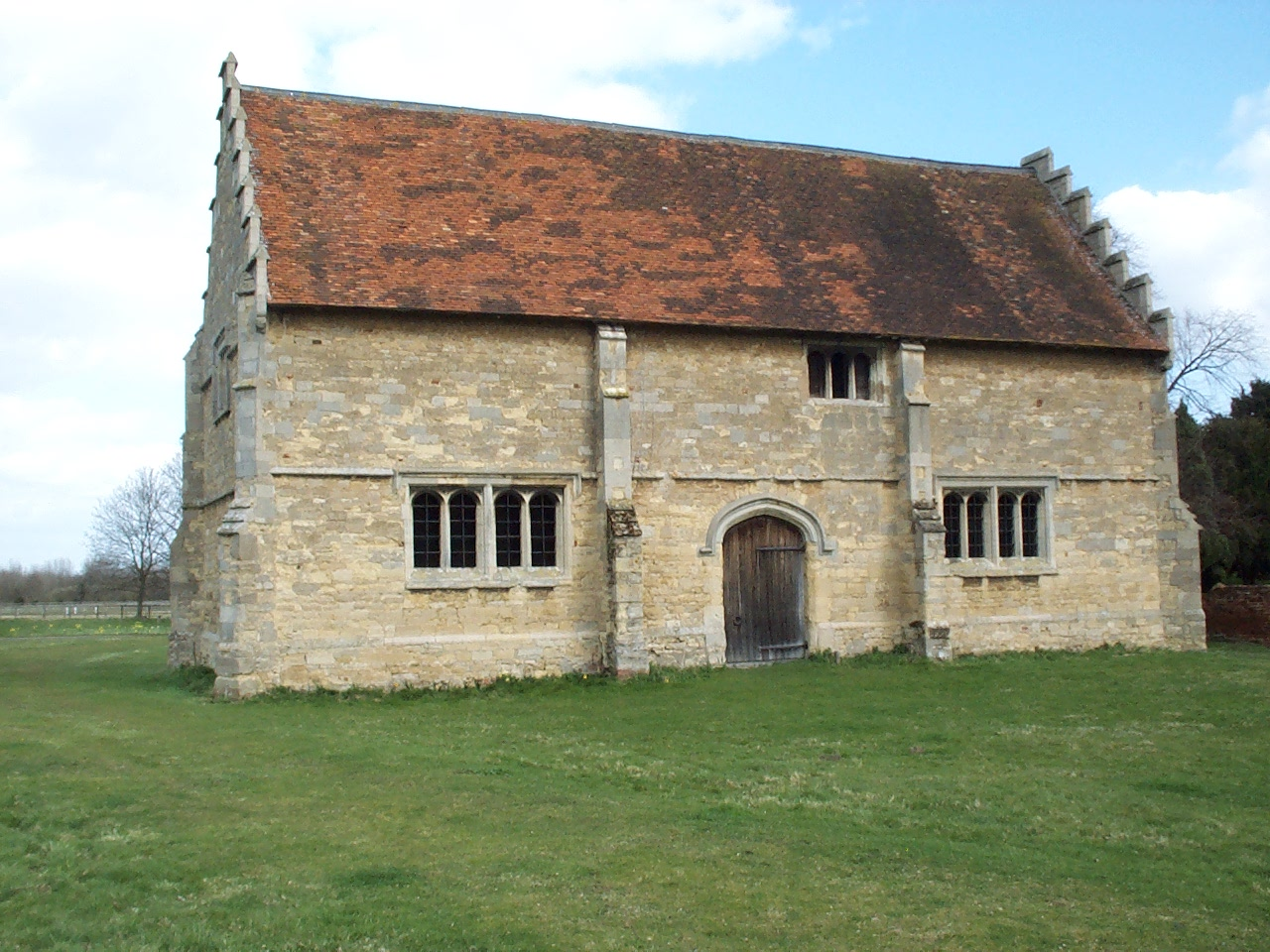
The stables

The property is a 16th-century stable and stone dovecote, which contains nesting boxes for over 1500 pigeons.

The dovecote and stables themselves were commissioned by Sir John Gostwick. Completed in around 1541, they were made from the remains of a manorial complex, and include stones most likely taken from local priories, in particular Newnham Priory, after the dissolution of the monasteries.

A signature on the stone above the fireplace in the stables reads "John Bunyan 1650" but Historic England doubts its authenticity.
