= Church of St Mary the Virgin, Yielden =

Church in Bedfordshire, England

Coordinates: 52.29274°N 0.519059°W

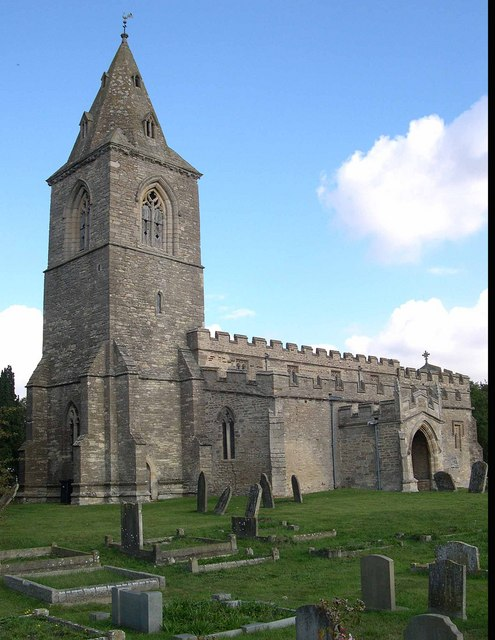

Church of St Mary the Virgin is a Grade I listed church in Yelden, Bedfordshire, England.

It is a good example of a village church mainly in the Decorated style.

Originally the Trailly family received it from the monks at Thorney Abbey early in the 12th Century and was confirmed to them by a charter of Pope Alexander III in 1162.

Although Norman in origin its shows no indication of this in its construction. It consists of a Nave and Chancel dating back to the early 13th Century and had been considerably re-modelled since then, the most notable feature being the tower and broach spire.

The churchyard contains Commonwealth war graves of a Norfolk Regiment soldier of World War I and an airman of World War II.

== See also ==
- Grade I listed buildings in Bedfordshire
