= List of settlements in Bedfordshire by population =

Some of the larger settlements of Bedfordshire.

This is a list of all the settlements in Bedfordshire. Population figures are taken from the 2001 UK census and 2011 UK Census. Population figures are given for the civil parishes as well as urban areas. There is no data for some of the smallest civil parishes in the 2011 census. The ONS definition of an urban area is based on the continuously built-up area, and is as follows:-

"The definition of an urban area is an extent of at least 20 hectares and at least 1,500 residents at the time of the 2001 Census. The starting point is the identification by OS (Ordnance Survey) of areas with land use which is irreversibly urban in character. This comprises permanent structures and the land on which they are situated, including land enclosed by or closely associated with such structures; transportation corridors such as roads, railways and canals which have built up land on one or both sides, or which link built-up sites which are less than 200 metres apart; transportation features such as airports and operational airfields, railway yards, motorway service areas and car parks; mine buildings, excluding mineral workings and quarries; and any area completely surrounded by builtup sites. Areas such as playing fields and golf courses are excluded unless completely surrounded by builtup sites. The prerequisite for the recognition of an urban area is that the area of urban land should extend for 20 hectares or more. Separate areas of urban land are linked if less than 200 metres apart. Land between built-up areas is not regarded as urban unless it satisfies one of the conditions listed above."

According to this definition of an Urban Area, Bedfordshire contains two urban areas that have populations over 100,000.

Settlement	Built-Up Area 2001		Built-Up Area 2011		Parish Population		Notes
Settlement	Population	Area (km^{2})	Population	Area (km^{2})	2001	2011	Notes
Luton	236,318	48.95	258,018	50.71			Luton is an unparished area. The Borough of Luton had a population of 226,973.
Bedford	101,928	23.54	106,940	24.82			This figure is for the Bedford built-up-area. The area of the historic county town of Bedford is unparished, whilst the town of Kempston and the village of Biddenham are parished.
Leighton Buzzard	32,573	7.95	37,469	8.64	32,753	37,469	The parish is named Leighton–Linslade
Flitwick	19,467	4.43	20,026	4.84	12,700	12,998	
Biggleswade	15,383	3.57	16,551	3.94	15,383	16,551	
Sandy	10,887	2.82	11,657	3.22	10,887	11,657	
Shefford	12,052	6.24	10,816	3.05	4,928	5,881	
Stotfold	6,109	1.33	6,838	1.68	6,109	9,632	
Arlesey	4,741	1.23	5,584	1.35	4,741	5,584	
Cranfield	4,802	3.25	5,369	2.37	4,909	5,369	
Barton-le-Clay	4,793	1.11	4,992	1.31	4,793	4,992	
Potton	4,473	1.01	4,870	1.43	4,473	4,870	
Bromham	4,599	1.35	4,670	1.57	4,768	4,957	
Toddington	4,195	1.01	4,585	1.11	4,459	4,585	
Clapham	3,643	1.12	4,560	1.34	3,643	4,560	
Wootton	4,472	1.06	4,344	1.22	4,230	4,156	
Eaton Bray	4,139	1.13	3,912	1.44	2,591	2,585	
Stondon			3,857	1.44	1,821	2,295	The built-up area population includes Henlow Camp
Marston Moretaine	3,041	0.72	3,850	0.88	3,684	4,556	
Caddington	3,100	0.69	3,112	0.78	3,673	3,703	
Langford	2,882	0.78	3,091	1.03	2,882	3,091	
Oakley	2,438	0.69	2,493	0.86	2,438	2,493	
Shortstown	1,745	0.87	2,401	0.42			Part of Eastcotts civil parish until 2019
Clophill	1,882	0.60	2,369	0.78	1,702	1,738	
Maulden	2,256	0.61	2,357	0.84	2,900	3,132	
Harlington	2,322	0.66	2,297	0.68	2,322	2,297	
Wilshamstead	1,969	0.58	2,177	0.82	2,263	3,270	
Westoning	2,001	0.45	2,147	0.55	2,001	2,147	
Great Barford	1,864	0.59	2,003	0.74	1,864	2,003	
Greenfield	1,529	0.49	1,831	0.74	1,212	1,415	
Sharnbrook			1,795	0.83	1,940	2,293	
Silsoe	1,729	0.61	1,791	0.68	1,729	1,791	
Meppershall	1,549	0.57	1,745	0.72	1,549	1,745	
Harrold			1,691	0.63	1,235	1,691	
Kensworth	1,504	0.49	1,455	0.54	1,504	1,455	
Shillington			1,447	0.53	1,831	1,842	
Campton and Chicksands			1,396	0.73	1,388	1,699	
Slip End			1,358	0.51	1,976	1,831	
Heath and Reach			1,346	0.40	1,285	1,346	
Houghton Conquest			1,311	0.46	1,299	1,514	
Riseley			1,286	0.62	1,284	1,286	
Stewartby			1,190	0.96	1,212	1,190	
Lidlington			1,185	0.31	1,145	1,347	
Stanbridge			1,044	0.76	747	713	
Totternhoe			982	0.52	1,180	1,172	
Blunham			946	0.64	926	946	
Turvey			940	0.34	1,192	1,225	
Haynes			940	0.40	1,122	1,199	
Woburn			933	0.31	945	933	
Eastcotts			838	2.45	3,187	3,239	Eastcotts parish is split between two Built-Up areas, Cotton End and Shortstown. The latter of which became its own parish in 2019.
Hockliffe			823	0.29	730	823	
Milton Ernest			761	0.30	754	761	
Willington			751	0.52	782	751	
Cople			722	0.39	736	722	
Dunton			696	0.23	653	696	
Thurleigh			694	0.22	696	694	
Northill			636	0.48	2,288	2,270	
Moggerhanger			620	0.30	636	620	
Gravenhurst			595	0.32	581	595	
Tempsford			590	0.26	564	590	
Pulloxhill			569	0.32	850	985	
Streatley			559	0.30	1,707	1,840	
Stevington			552	0.32	581	552	
Chalton			538	0.46	549	538	
Pavenham			527	0.36	593	712	
Everton			523	0.41	525	523	
Felmersham						748	
Radwell			509	0.20			In the parish of Felmersham
Studham			492	0.20	1,125	1,128	
Little Staughton			440	0.28	421	440	
Podington			435	0.22	417	435	
Ridgmont			411	0.25	418	411	
Stagsden			363	0.23	354	363	
Roxton			348	0.24	322	348	
Brogborough			302	0.38	343	302	
Cardington			288	0.30	316	288	
Whipsnade			279	0.28	457	420	
Dunstable					33,805	36,253	Part of the Luton/Dunstable urban area
Houghton Regis					16,970	17,283	Part of the Luton/Dunstable urban area
Ampthill					6,767	7,028	Part of Flitwick's Built-up area
Henlow					3,084	3,815	Forms part of Shefford's built-up area
Clifton					2,730	2,878	Forms part of Shefford's built-up area
Elstow					2,049	2,702	Forms part of Bedford's built-up area
Renhold					1,448	2,451	
Aspley Guise					2,185	2,195	Forms part of the Milton Keynes urban area
Ravensden					706	1,961	
Biddenham					1,640	1,634	Part of Bedford's Built-up Area
Great Denham					980	1,553	
Southill					1,141	1,192	
Kempston					19,375	1,184	Forms part of Bedford's built-up area
Kempston Rural					1,286	1,184	
Wyboston, Chawston and Colesden					946	936	
Wymington					868	876	
Carlton and Chellington					827	874	
Wrestlingworth and Cockayne Hatley					737	744	
Bolnhurst and Keysoe					734	719	
Aspley Heath					573	578	
Sundon					507	480	
Chalgrave					480	475	
Eversholt					387	442	
Dean and Shelton					386	418	
Wilden					412	399	
Colmworth					367	393	
Hyde					402	392	
Melchbourne and Yielden					391	392	
Sutton					299	366	
Tilsworth					360	331	
Staploe					347	331	
Old Warden					275	328	
Great Billington					632	291	
Eggington					288	287	
Odell					260	287	
Bletsoe					281	260	
Knotting and Souldrop					269	238	
Husborne Crawley					217	237	
Steppingley					233	236	
Milton Bryan					144	220	
Hulcote and Salford					186	209	
Pertenhall					231	207	
Tingrith					149	153	
Millbrook					130	147	
Swineshead					150	122	
Eyeworth					86		
Edworth					69		
Little Barford					44		
Potsgrove					44		
Battlesden					37		
Astwick					24		

== See also ==
- Civil parishes in Bedfordshire
- List of towns and cities in England by population
