= Civil parishes in Bedfordshire =

List of places

A map of Bedfordshire, showing the districts: (1) Bedford; (2) Central Bedfordshire; and (3) Luton

A civil parish is a country subdivision, forming the lowest unit of local government in England. There are 125 civil parishes in the ceremonial county of Bedfordshire, most of the county being parished: Luton is completely unparished; Central Bedfordshire is entirely parished. At the 2001 census, there were 312,301 people living in the 125 parishes, which accounted for 55.2 per cent of the county's population.

== History ==
Parishes arose from Church of England divisions, and were originally purely ecclesiastical divisions. Over time they acquired civil administration powers.

The Highways Act 1555 made parishes responsible for the upkeep of roads. Every adult inhabitant of the parish was obliged to work four days a year on the roads, providing their own tools, carts and horses; the work was overseen by an unpaid local appointee, the Surveyor of Highways.

The poor were looked after by the monasteries, until their dissolution. In 1572, magistrates were given power to 'survey the poor' and impose taxes for their relief. This system was made more formal by the Poor Law Act 1601, which made parishes responsible for administering the Poor Law; overseers were appointed to charge a rate to support the poor of the parish. The 19th century saw an increase in the responsibility of parishes, although the Poor Law powers were transferred to Poor Law Unions. The Public Health Act 1872 grouped parishes into Rural Sanitary Districts, based on the Poor Law Unions; these subsequently formed the basis for Rural Districts.

Parishes were run by vestries, meeting annually to appoint officials, and were generally identical to ecclesiastical parishes, although some townships in large parishes administered the Poor Law themselves; under the Divided Parishes and Poor Law Amendment Act 1882, all extra-parochial areas and townships that levied a separate rate became independent civil parishes.

Civil parishes in their modern sense date from the Local Government Act 1894, which abolished vestries; established elected parish councils in all rural parishes with more than 300 electors; grouped rural parishes into Rural Districts; and aligned parish boundaries with county and borough boundaries. Urban civil parishes continued to exist, and were generally coterminous with the Urban District, Municipal Borough or County Borough in which they were situated; many large towns contained a number of parishes, and these were usually merged into one. Parish councils were not formed in urban areas, and the only function of the parish was to elect guardians to Poor Law Unions; with the abolition of the Poor Law system in 1930 the parishes had only a nominal existence.

The Local Government Act 1972 retained civil parishes in rural areas, and many former Urban Districts and Municipal Boroughs that were being abolished, were replaced by new successor parishes; urban areas that were considered too large to be single parishes became unparished areas.

== The current position ==
Recent governments have encouraged the formation of town and parish councils in unparished areas, and the Local Government and Rating Act 1997 gave local residents the right to demand the creation of a new civil parish.

A parish council can become a town council unilaterally, simply by resolution; and a civil parish can also gain city status, but only if that is granted by the Crown. The chairman of a town or city council is called a mayor. The Local Government and Public Involvement in Health Act 2007 introduced alternative names: a parish council can now choose to be called a community; village; or neighbourhood council.

Civil parishes with town status

== List of civil parishes and unparished areas ==
Image	Name	Status	Population (2001 census)	District	Former local authority	Refs
	Bedford	Unparished area	69,271	Bedford	Bedford Municipal Borough	
	Biddenham	Civil parish	1,640	Bedford	Bedford; Rural District	
	Bletsoe	Civil parish	281	Bedford	Bedford; Rural District	
	Bolnhurst and Keysoe	Civil parish	734	Bedford	Bedford; Rural District	
	Brickhill	Civil parish	8,678	Bedford	Bedford Municipal Borough	
	Bromham	Civil parish	4,768	Bedford	Bedford; Rural District	
	Cardington	Civil parish	316	Bedford	Bedford; Rural District	
	Carlton and Chellington	Civil parish	827	Bedford	Bedford; Rural District	
	Clapham	Civil parish	3,643	Bedford	Bedford; Rural District	
	Colmworth	Civil parish	367	Bedford	Bedford; Rural District	
	Cople	Civil parish	736	Bedford	Bedford; Rural District	
	Cotton End	Civil parish		Bedford	Bedford; Rural District	
	Dean and Shelton	Civil parish	386	Bedford	Bedford; Rural District	
	Elstow	Civil parish	2,049	Bedford	Bedford; Rural District	
	Felmersham	Civil parish	737	Bedford	Bedford; Rural District	
	Great Barford	Civil parish	1,864	Bedford	Bedford; Rural District	
	Great Denham	Civil parish	980	Bedford	Bedford; Rural District	
	Harrold	Civil parish	1,235	Bedford	Bedford; Rural District	
	Kempston	Town	19,375	Bedford	Kempston Urban District	
	Kempston Rural	Civil parish	1,286	Bedford	Bedford; Rural District	
	Knotting and Souldrop	Civil parish	269	Bedford	Bedford; Rural District	
	Little Barford	Civil parish	44	Bedford	Bedford; Rural District	
	Little Staughton	Civil parish	421	Bedford	Bedford; Rural District	
	Melchbourne and Yielden	Civil parish	391	Bedford	Bedford; Rural District	
	Milton Ernest	Civil parish	754	Bedford	Bedford; Rural District	
	Oakley	Civil parish	2,438	Bedford	Bedford; Rural District	
	Odell	Civil parish	260	Bedford	Bedford; Rural District	
	Pavenham	Civil parish	593	Bedford	Bedford; Rural District	
	Pertenhall	Civil parish	231	Bedford	Bedford; Rural District	
	Podington	Civil parish	417	Bedford	Bedford; Rural District	
	Ravensden	Civil parish	706	Bedford	Bedford; Rural District	
	Renhold	Civil parish	1,448	Bedford	Bedford; Rural District	
	Riseley	Civil parish	1,284	Bedford	Bedford; Rural District	
	Roxton	Civil parish	322	Bedford	Bedford; Rural District	
	Sharnbrook	Civil parish	1,940	Bedford	Bedford; Rural District	
	Shortstown	Civil parish		Bedford	Bedford; Rural District	
	Stagsden	Civil parish	354	Bedford	Bedford; Rural District	
	Staploe	Civil parish	347	Bedford	Bedford; Rural District	
	Stevington	Civil parish	581	Bedford	Bedford; Rural District	
	Stewartby	Civil parish	1,212	Bedford	Bedford; Rural District	
	Swineshead	Civil parish	150	Bedford	Bedford; Rural District	
	Thurleigh	Civil parish	696	Bedford	Bedford; Rural District	
	Turvey	Civil parish	1,192	Bedford	Bedford; Rural District	
	Wilden	Civil parish	412	Bedford	Bedford; Rural District	
	Willington	Civil parish	782	Bedford	Bedford; Rural District	
	Wilshamstead	Civil parish	2,263	Bedford	Bedford; Rural District	
	Wixams	Civil parish		Bedford	Bedford; Rural District	
	Wootton	Civil parish	4,230	Bedford	Bedford; Rural District	
	Wyboston, Chawston and Colesden	Civil parish	946	Bedford	Bedford; Rural District	
	Wymington	Civil parish	868	Bedford	Bedford; Rural District	
	Ampthill	Town	6,767	Central Bedfordshire	Ampthill Urban District	
	Arlesey	Town	4,741	Central Bedfordshire	Biggleswade; Rural District	
	Aspley Guise	Civil parish	2,185	Central Bedfordshire	Ampthill; Rural District	
	Aspley Heath	Civil parish	573	Central Bedfordshire	Ampthill; Rural District	
	Astwick	Civil parish	24	Central Bedfordshire	Biggleswade; Rural District	
	Barton-le-Clay	Civil parish	4,793	Central Bedfordshire	Luton; Rural District	
	Battlesden	Civil parish	37	Central Bedfordshire	Ampthill; Rural District	
	Biggleswade	Town	15,383	Central Bedfordshire	Biggleswade Urban District	
	Billington	Civil parish	632	Central Bedfordshire	Luton; Rural District	
	Blunham	Civil parish	926	Central Bedfordshire	Biggleswade; Rural District	
	Brogborough	Civil parish	343	Central Bedfordshire	Ampthill; Rural District	
	Caddington	Civil parish	3,673	Central Bedfordshire	Luton; Rural District	
	Campton and Chicksands	Civil parish	1,388	Central Bedfordshire	Biggleswade; Rural District	
	Chalgrave	Civil parish	480	Central Bedfordshire	Luton; Rural District	
	Chalton	Civil parish	549	Central Bedfordshire	Luton; Rural District	
	Clifton	Civil parish	2,730	Central Bedfordshire	Biggleswade; Rural District	
	Clophill	Civil parish	1,702	Central Bedfordshire	Ampthill; Rural District	
	Cranfield	Civil parish	4,909	Central Bedfordshire	Ampthill; Rural District	
	Dunstable	Town	33,805	Central Bedfordshire	Dunstable Municipal Borough	
	Dunton	Civil parish	653	Central Bedfordshire	Biggleswade; Rural District	
	Eaton Bray	Civil parish	2,591	Central Bedfordshire	Luton; Rural District	
	Edworth	Civil parish	69	Central Bedfordshire	Biggleswade; Rural District	
	Eggington	Civil parish	288	Central Bedfordshire	Luton; Rural District	
	Eversholt	Civil parish	387	Central Bedfordshire	Ampthill; Rural District	
	Everton	Civil parish	525	Central Bedfordshire	Biggleswade; Rural District	
	Eyeworth	Civil parish	86	Central Bedfordshire	Biggleswade; Rural District	
	Fairfield	Civil parish		Central Bedfordshire	Biggleswade; Rural District	
	Flitton and Greenfield	Civil parish	1,212	Central Bedfordshire	Ampthill; Rural District	
	Flitwick	Town	12,700	Central Bedfordshire	Ampthill; Rural District	
	Gravenhurst	Civil parish	581	Central Bedfordshire	Ampthill; Rural District	
	Harlington	Civil parish	2,322	Central Bedfordshire	Ampthill; Rural District	
	Haynes	Civil parish	1,122	Central Bedfordshire	Ampthill; Rural District	
	Heath and Reach	Civil parish	1,285	Central Bedfordshire	Luton; Rural District	
	Henlow	Civil parish	3,084	Central Bedfordshire	Biggleswade; Rural District	
	Hockliffe	Civil parish	730	Central Bedfordshire	Luton; Rural District	
	Houghton Conquest	Civil parish	1,299	Central Bedfordshire	Ampthill; Rural District	
	Houghton Regis	Town	16,970	Central Bedfordshire	Luton; Rural District	
	Hulcote and Salford	Civil parish	186	Central Bedfordshire	Ampthill; Rural District	
	Husborne Crawley	Civil parish	217	Central Bedfordshire	Ampthill; Rural District	
	Hyde	Civil parish	402	Central Bedfordshire	Luton; Rural District	
	Kensworth	Civil parish	1,504	Central Bedfordshire	Luton; Rural District	
	Langford	Civil parish	2,882	Central Bedfordshire	Biggleswade; Rural District	
	Leighton–Linslade	Town	32,417	Central Bedfordshire	Leighton–Linslade Urban District	
	Lidlington	Civil parish	1,145	Central Bedfordshire	Ampthill; Rural District	
	Marston Moreteyne	Civil parish	3,684	Central Bedfordshire	Ampthill; Rural District	
	Maulden	Civil parish	2,900	Central Bedfordshire	Ampthill; Rural District	
	Meppershall	Civil parish	1,549	Central Bedfordshire	Biggleswade; Rural District	
	Millbrook	Civil parish	130	Central Bedfordshire	Ampthill; Rural District	
	Milton Bryan	Civil parish	144	Central Bedfordshire	Ampthill; Rural District	
	Moggerhanger	Civil parish	636	Central Bedfordshire	Biggleswade; Rural District	
	Northill	Civil parish	2,288	Central Bedfordshire	Biggleswade; Rural District	
	Old Warden	Civil parish	275	Central Bedfordshire	Biggleswade; Rural District	
	Potsgrove	Civil parish	44	Central Bedfordshire	Ampthill; Rural District	
	Potton	Town	4,473	Central Bedfordshire	Biggleswade; Rural District	
	Pulloxhill	Civil parish	850	Central Bedfordshire	Ampthill; Rural District	
	Ridgmont	Civil parish	418	Central Bedfordshire	Ampthill; Rural District	
	Sandy	Town	10,887	Central Bedfordshire	Sandy Urban District	
	Shefford	Town	4,928	Central Bedfordshire	Biggleswade; Rural District	
	Shillington	Civil parish	1,831	Central Bedfordshire	Ampthill; Rural District	
	Silsoe	Civil parish	1,729	Central Bedfordshire	Ampthill; Rural District	
	Slip End	Civil parish	1,976	Central Bedfordshire	Luton; Rural District	
	Southill	Civil parish	1,141	Central Bedfordshire	Biggleswade; Rural District	
	Stanbridge	Civil parish	747	Central Bedfordshire	Luton; Rural District	
	Steppingley	Civil parish	233	Central Bedfordshire	Ampthill; Rural District	
	Stondon	Civil parish	1,821	Central Bedfordshire	Biggleswade; Rural District	
	Stotfold	Town	6,190	Central Bedfordshire	Biggleswade; Rural District	
	Streatley	Civil parish	1,707	Central Bedfordshire	Luton; Rural District	
	Studham	Civil parish	1,125	Central Bedfordshire	Luton; Rural District	
	Sundon	Civil parish	507	Central Bedfordshire	Luton; Rural District	
	Sutton	Civil parish	299	Central Bedfordshire	Biggleswade; Rural District	
	Tempsford	Civil parish	564	Central Bedfordshire	Biggleswade; Rural District	
	Tilsworth	Civil parish	360	Central Bedfordshire	Luton; Rural District	
	Tingrith	Civil parish	149	Central Bedfordshire	Ampthill; Rural District	
	Toddington	Civil parish	4,459	Central Bedfordshire	Luton; Rural District	
	Totternhoe	Civil parish	1,180	Central Bedfordshire	Luton; Rural District	
	Westoning	Civil parish	2,001	Central Bedfordshire	Ampthill; Rural District	
	Whipsnade	Civil parish	457	Central Bedfordshire	Luton; Rural District	
	Woburn	Civil parish	945	Central Bedfordshire	Ampthill; Rural District	
	Wrestlingworth and Cockayne Hatley	Civil parish	737	Central Bedfordshire	Biggleswade; Rural District	
	Luton	Unparished area	184,371	Luton	Luton County Borough	

== See also ==
- List of civil parishes in England
