= Ampthill Rural District =

Former local government area in the UK

Coordinates: 52.027°N 0.495°W

- Rural district
Coat of arms
- Population
  - 1901: 19,146
  - 1971: 32,005
- History
  - Created: 28 December 1894
  - Abolished: 31 March 1974
  - Succeeded by: Mid Bedfordshire
  - HQ: Ampthill
- Contained within
  - County Council: Bedfordshire

Map of boundaries as of 1971

Ampthill was a rural district in Bedfordshire, England from 1894 to 1974. It entirely surrounded but did not include the urban district of Ampthill.

The district had its origins in the Ampthill Rural Sanitary District. This had been created under the Public Health Acts of 1872 and 1875, giving public health and local government responsibilities for rural areas to the existing Boards of Guardians of Poor Law Unions.

Under the Local Government Act 1894, Rural Sanitary Districts became Rural Districts from 28 December 1894. The link with the Poor Law Union continued, with all the elected councillors of the Rural District Council being ex officio members of the Ampthill Board of Guardians. The first meeting of the new council was held on 3 January 1895 in the board room of the Ampthill Union Workhouse. The council's first chairman, Edward Crouch, had been the chairman of the previous Board of Guardians.

In 1900 the district was significantly enlarged, when the neighbouring Woburn Rural District was abolished, with the majority of the former Woburn district becoming part of the Ampthill Rural District.

The council was granted a coat of arms in 1957.

The rural district contained the following civil parishes. All the parishes added to the district in 1900 were from the abolished Woburn Rural District:

- Aspley Guise (after 1900)
- Aspley Heath (after 1900)
- Battlesden (after 1900)
- Clophill
- Cranfield
- Eversholt (after 1900)
- Flitton
- Flitwick
- Gravenhurst
- Harlington (after 1900)
- Holcot (after 1900) - merged with Salford parish 1933
- Hulcote and Salford formed 1933 from Holcot, Salford parishes
- Husborne Crawley (after 1900)
- Lidlington
- Marston Moretaine
- Maulden
- Millbrook
- Milton Bryan (after 1900)
- Potsgrove (after 1900)
- Pulloxhill
- Ridgmont (after 1900)
- Salford (after 1900) - merged with Holcot parish 1933
- Shillington
- Silsoe
- Steppingley
- Tingrith (after 1900)
- Toddington (after 1900) - Transferred to Luton Rural District 1933
- Westoning
- Woburn (after 1900)

== Premises ==
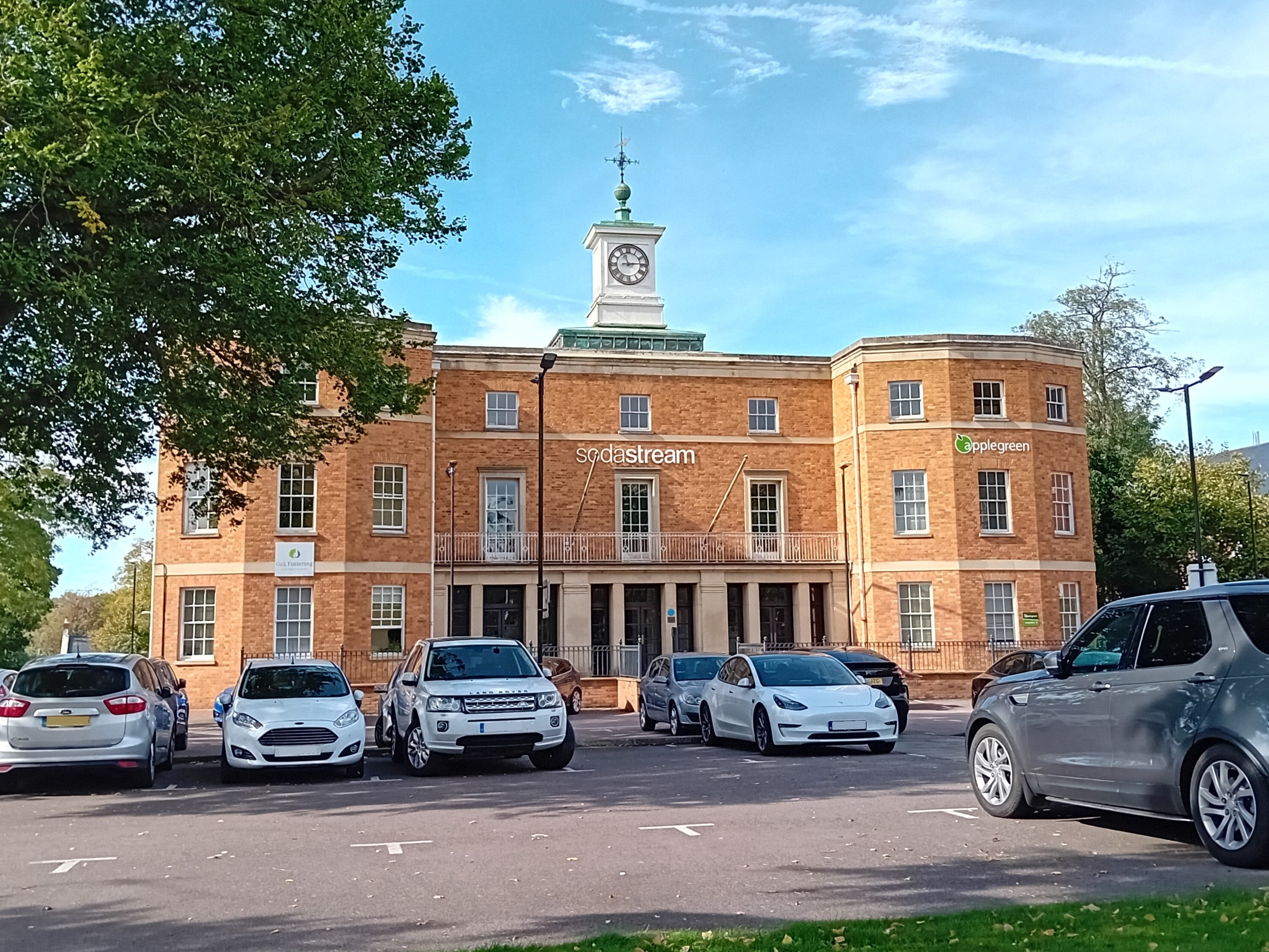
12 Dunstable Street, Ampthill

Until the 1930s the council continued to use the board room of the Ampthill Union Workhouse at 1 Dunstable Street in Ampthill as its meeting place. Administrative office functions were carried out at various premises both in the town of Ampthill and in neighbouring Flitwick. The council acquired a large house called The Limes at 12 Dunstable Street in Ampthill, which became their offices and meeting place in 1939.

The Limes was demolished and replacement offices built on the site in 1963–1965 to the designs of Sir Albert Richardson.

== Abolition ==
In 1974, under the Local Government Act 1972, it was merged with other districts to form the new Mid Bedfordshire district. The new Mid Bedfordshire District Council continued to use the offices at 12 Dunstable Street until 2006. The area now forms part of Central Bedfordshire.
