= Woburn Rural District =

History of Bedfordshire

Coordinates: 51.988°N 0.619°W

Woburn
- Rural district
- Population
  - 1891: 9,295
- History
  - Created: 28 December 1894
  - Abolished: 31 March 1900
  - Succeeded by: Ampthill Rural District
  - HQ: Woburn
- Contained within
  - County Council: Bedfordshire
- Map of boundary as of abolition

Woburn was a rural district in Bedfordshire, England from 1894 to 1900, covering Woburn and surrounding parishes.

The district had its origins in the Woburn Rural Sanitary District. This had been created under the Public Health Acts of 1872 and 1875, giving public health and local government responsibilities for rural areas to the existing Boards of Guardians of Poor Law Unions.

Under the Local Government Act 1894, Rural Sanitary Districts became Rural Districts from 28 December 1894. The link with the Poor Law Union continued, with all the elected councillors of the Rural District Council being ex officio members of the Woburn Board of Guardians. The first meeting of the new council was held on 4 January 1895 in the board room of the Woburn Union Workhouse. The council's first chairman, James Crouch, had been the chairman of the previous Board of Guardians.

Woburn was a relatively small district, with the population of the area in the 1891 census having been 9,295. In 1899 the Woburn Poor Law Union was abolished, being split between the Ampthill Poor Law Union (14 parishes) and Leighton Buzzard Poor Law Union (3 parishes) on 29 September 1899. The Rural District Council tried to have itself similarly disbanded on the same date, but the process of formally abolishing it took a few months longer, with an inquiry being held at Woburn Town Hall in September 1899. The district was finally abolished on 31 March 1900. Its area was split in the same way that the Poor Law Union had been, with the three parishes of Chalgrave, Hockliffe, and Tilsworth joining the Eaton Bray Rural District and the remaining fourteen parishes joining the Ampthill Rural District.

The rural district contained the following civil parishes:

- Aspley Guise
- Aspley Heath
- Battlesden
- Chalgrave
- Eversholt
- Harlington
- Hockliffe
- Holcot
- Husborne Crawley
- Milton Bryan
- Potsgrove
- Ridgmont
- Salford
- Tilsworth
- Tingrith
- Toddington
- Woburn
