= Manshead =

Historical land division in Bedfordshire, England

Coordinates: 51.897°N 0.508°W

- Hundred
- Location within the United Kingdom
- Country: England
- Sovereign state: United Kingdom
- Parishes: Aspley Guise, Battlesden, Chalgrave, Dunstable, Eaton Bray, Eversholt, Harlington, Hockliffe, Holcot, Houghton Regis, Husborne Crawley, Leighton Buzzard, Milton Bryan, Potsgrove, Salford, Studham, Tilsworth, Tingrith, Toddington, Totternhoe, Westoning, Whipsnade, Woburn

Manshead was a hundred of Bedfordshire in England. It covered an area in the south-west of the county stretching from Salford to Studham and from Leighton Buzzard to Houghton Regis and Dunstable.

The hundred was named after a site in Eversholt parish. The name appears as "Maunesheved", with Thomas Camill as the bailiff. in 1349. The area west of the Watling Street is recorded in the Domesday Book as the half-hundred of Stanbridge, and there is also a mention of a hundred called Odecroft which may have covered the area south of the Ouzel Brook. By the early 14th century, these areas had effectively been incorporated into Manshead hundred.

== Parishes ==
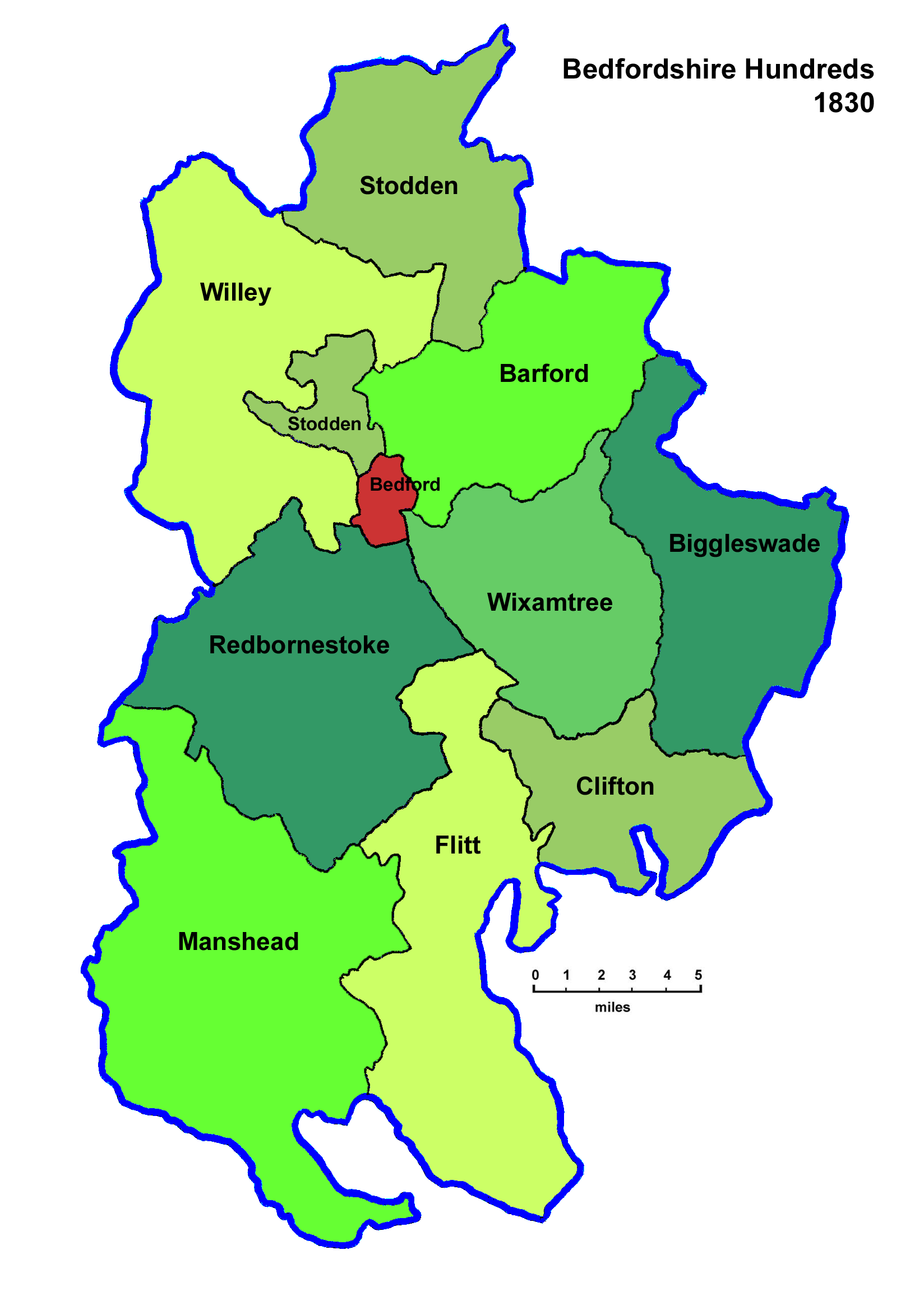
The Hundreds of Bedfordshire in 1830

The hundred contained the following parishes:

Aspley Guise, Battlesden, Chalgrave, Dunstable, Eaton Bray, Eversholt, Harlington, Hockliffe, Holcot, Houghton Regis, Husborne Crawley, Leighton Buzzard, Milton Bryan, Potsgrove, Salford, Studham, Tilsworth, Tingrith, Toddington, Totternhoe, Westoning, Whipsnade, Woburn

== Recent use of the name ==
- When the Manshead Archaeological Society (www.manshead.org.uk) was formed in 1952, the name of the ancient hundred was chosen to embrace the intended area of activity.
- Manshead CE Academy gained the name after much discussion in 1972 when comprehensive schools were introduced in Dunstable.
- Since 2002, the Manshead electoral ward of South Bedfordshire (now Central Bedfordshire) has covered part of Dunstable near to Manshead School.

== See also ==
- Hundreds of Bedfordshire
