= Bryn West =

English cricketer (born 1975)

Bryn West (born 6 March 1975) is a retired English cricketer. He played as a right-handed batsman and right-arm medium-pace bowler who played for Bedfordshire. He was born in Westoning.

West made his only appearance in the Minor Counties Cricket Championship during the 1998 season. West's only List A appearance came in the 2000 NatWest Trophy competition, against Northumberland. From the tailend, he scored a single run, and took figures of 1/34.
