= St Mary's Church, Lower Gravenhurst =

Coordinates: 52.0045°N 0.3833°W

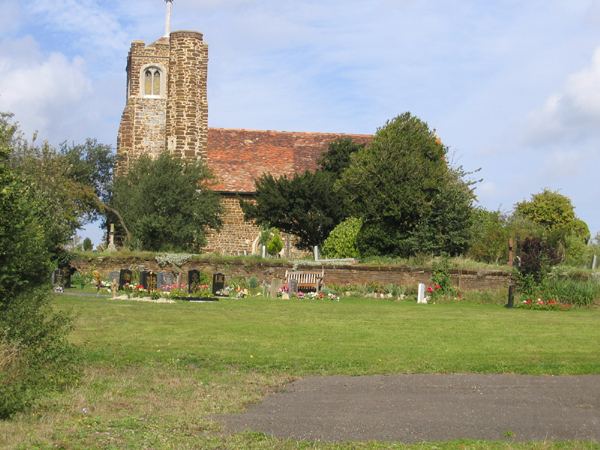
- St Mary's Church, Lower Gravenhurst, from the south

- Location in Bedfordshire
- OS grid reference: TL 111 352
- Location: Lower Gravenhurst, Bedfordshire
- Country: England
- Denomination: Anglican
- Website: Churches Conservation Trust

History
- Founder: Sir Robert de Bilhemore

Architecture
- Functional status: Redundant
- Heritage designation: Grade I
- Designated: 23 January 1961
- Architectural type: Church
- Style: Gothic

Specifications
- Materials: Ironstone with ashlar dressings Tiled roofs

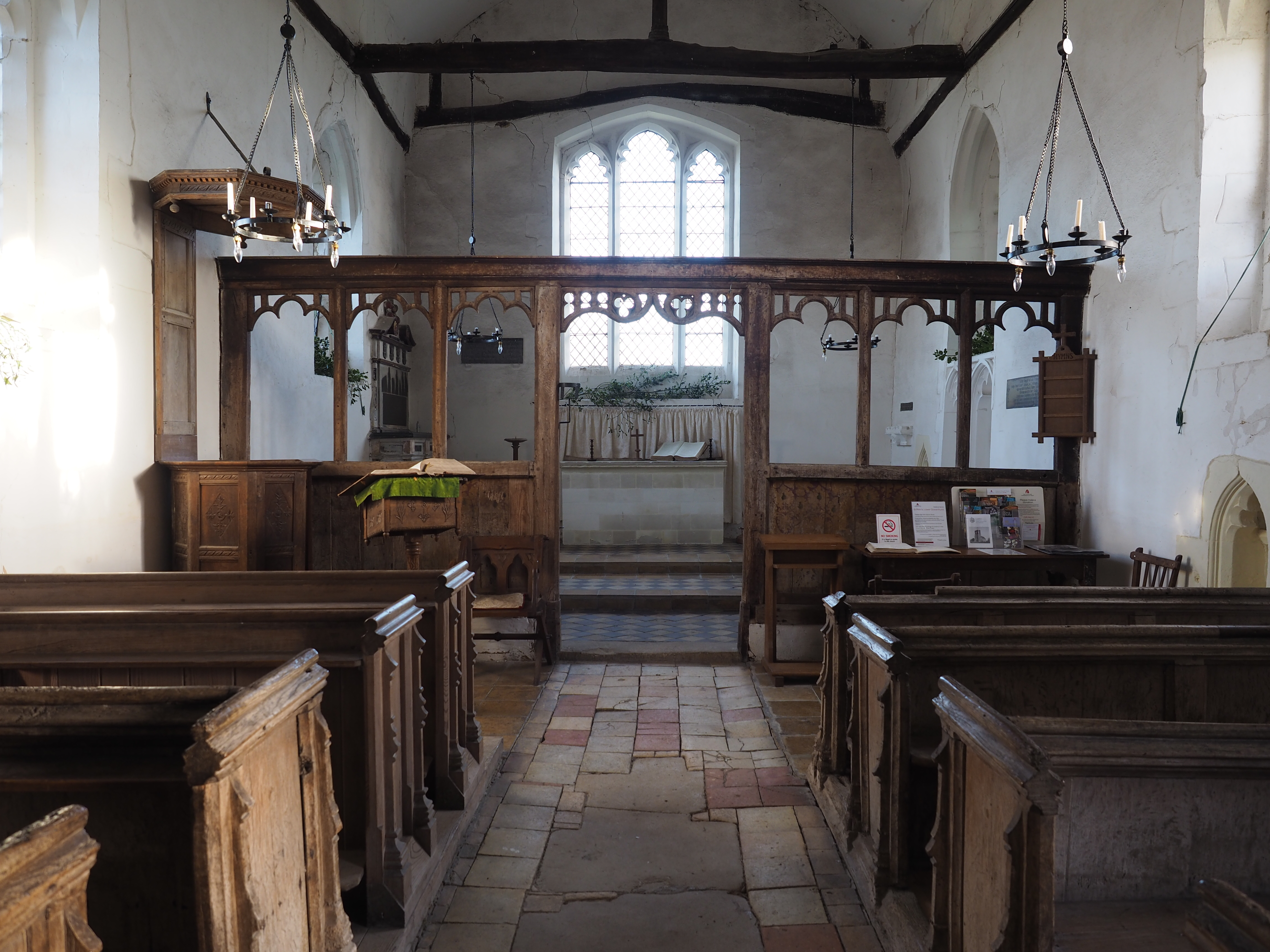
St Mary's, Lower Gravenhurst - Looking east to chancel screen

St Mary's Church is a redundant Anglican church in the village of Lower Gravenhurst, Bedfordshire, England. It is recorded in the National Heritage List for England as a designated Grade I listed building, and is under the care of the Churches Conservation Trust. Lower Gravenhurst is some 10 miles (16 km) southeast of Bedford, to the east of the A6 road. The church is surrounded by fields and stands on a small hill.

== History ==
The church dates from the 14th century, having been built for Sir Robert de Bilhemore, who died in about 1361. The tower was added in about 1400.

== Architecture ==
=== Exterior ===
St Mary's is constructed in ironstone rubble with ashlar dressings. Its roofs are tiled. The plan consists of a chancel and a nave in a single unit, and a west tower. Together they are only 14.8 x 5.8m with no division. The tower is in three stages with diagonal buttresses on the west side. At the southeast corner is a semi-octagonal stair turret. In the lowest stage is a three-light west window. The top stage contains two-light bell openings on each side. The parapet is embattled. On the tower is a pyramidal roof surmounted by a shaft, on top of which is a cross. The chancel has a three-light east window, and a two-light window on the north and south sides. In the nave is a two-light window and a doorway on both sides. Over the south door is a niche for a statue, most likely that of Our Lady, who is the patron saint of the church. An entrance porch has long disappeared.

=== Interior ===
In the chancel is a brass to the memory of the founder. There is also a monument to Benjamin Piggot, who died in 1606, his three wives and his children. It is in polychrome marble and incorporates coats of arms and brasses. The font is octagonal and dates from the 15th century, the cover is probably 17th century. Also from that century is the rood screen, which still has traces of painted decoration. The pulpit, with its sounding board, dates from the 17th century. In the chancel is a two-bay sedilia, and a piscina with an ogee head. Attached to the screen is a wrought-iron hourglass stand which would have been used to time sermons. There is a fine window in the south chancel by John Hall & Sons of Bristol & London showing the Archangels Michael and Gabriel.

== See also ==
- The Churches Conservation Trust: St Mary's Church, Lower Gravenhurst
