= Church of St Nicholas, Tingrith =

Church in Bedfordshire, England

Coordinates: 51.9813°N 0.5348°W

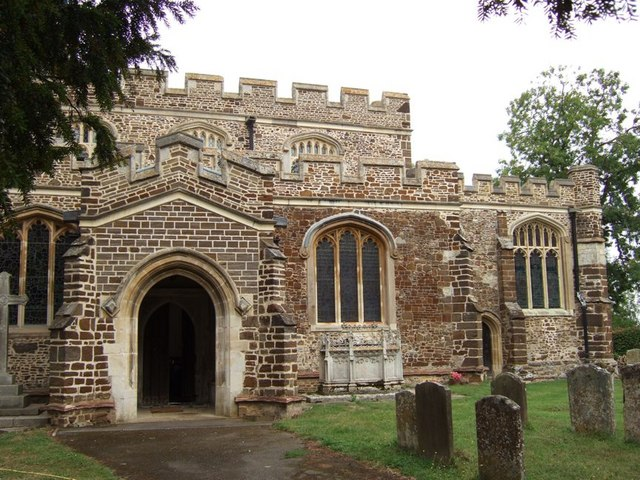

The Church of St Nicholas is a Grade I listed church in Tingrith, Bedfordshire, England. It became a listed building on 23 January 1961.

The brown sandstone walls date from the 15th century; the tracery of the windows is of white freestone.

== See also ==
- Grade I listed buildings in Bedfordshire
