= Tilsworth Castle =

- Tilsworth, Bedfordshire, England

Site information
- Type: Motte-and-bailey

Location
- Shown within Bedfordshire
- Coordinates: 51.909153°N 0.583324°W
- Grid reference: grid reference SP975243

Tilsworth Castle refers to both "Warren Knoll Motte" and "Tilsworth Manor", both built in the same general area, located in the civil parish of Tilsworth, in the county of Bedfordshire, England.

== Warren Knoll Motte ==
The first "Tilsworth Castle", now known as "Warren Knoll Motte", was a pre-11th century motte-and-bailey castle, built prior to the Norman Invasion in 1066. Originally a Saxon stronghold, it was held by Levric, son of Osmund. It was a timber castle, and believed to have had outer fortifications to the east and north.

Mentioned in the Domesday Book of 1086 as "Tilsworth Manor", it was at that time held by William Peverel. By the middle of the 13th century, the castle had passed into the Morteyn family, and was held by seven members of that family before passing, in 1362, into the hands of a Morteyn cousin, Richard Chamberlain. The manor was thus in the Chamberlain family, passing to Richard's son Richard (d. 24 August 1396), and then to Richard's grandson Richard (1390–1439), a minor at the time of his inheritance. During his minority, the manor was held by his mother Margaret Chamberlain (d. 18 April 1408), (née de Lovaine), and stepfather Philip St.Clair, until his possession of it, upon Margaret's death, in 1408. His death in 1439, and the death of his elder son Richard in the same year, left the manor in the possession of his younger son William Chamberlain.

Sometime around Richard's death, during the 15th century, a new manor house was built across from the church. The old one falling into ruins thereafter. Nothing but cropmarks and earthworks remain. The site was excavated in 1972, and is listed as a Scheduled Monument.

== Tilsworth Manor ==
Built just beside Warren Knoll, on lower ground, was the second "Tilsworth Castle", a 15th-century fortified, and moated, manor house. The manor was inclosed by an Act of Parliament in 1767. It was demolished about the year 1800 and a new manor house was built on the same location.

It was most likely built by Richard Chamberlain (d. 1496), the son of the previous mentioned William Chamberlain. The manor passed to Richard's son Edward Chamberlain (b. 1479), who gave it to his maternal grandfather Sir Richard Fowler in 1528. It was held in the Fowler family for only 3 generations, until sold by Richard Fowler, in 1606, to Sir Anthony Chester. The sale of the estate followed an incident, in 1600, during which Richard Fowler was imprisoned in the Tower of London as the result of a forged letter implicating him in a plot to poison Queen Elizabeth I. Richard's young wife, her lover and her brother were later convicted of the forgery.

The estate then passed through the hands of eight members of the Chester family before being sold by Charles Chester to Sir Gregory Osborn Page-Turner, son of Gregory Page-Turner, 3rd Baronet, in 1838. The property was then in the ownership of that family, in the forms of Mr. F. A. Page-Turner and Sir E. H. Page-Turner, until the latter's death in 1898, at which time it was held by his trustees.

Currently on the site is the third manor, of the same name, built in the 19th century by a member of the Chester family, which still retains the 15th century gate tower and the moat. The current Tilsworth Manor is a private residence, though the Tilsworth Fête is held in the grounds each June.

This last site of "Tilsworth Castle" is a Scheduled Monument.

== See also ==
- Castles in Great Britain and Ireland
- List of castles in England
