= Church of St Nicholas, Hulcote, Bedfordshire =

Church in Bedfordshire, England

Coordinates: 52.0399°N 0.6246°W

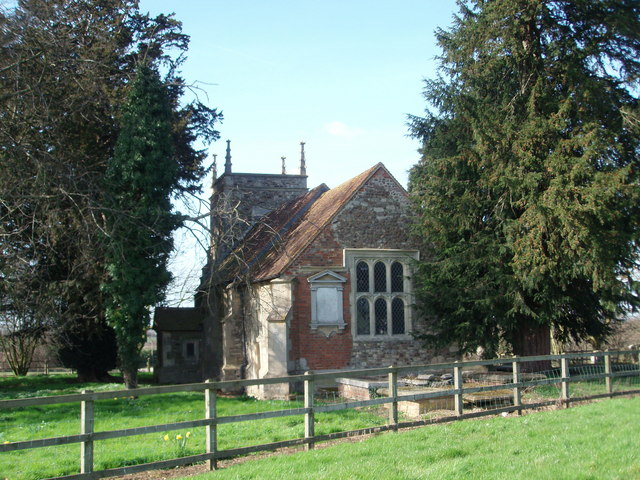

Church of St Nicholas is a Grade I listed church in Hulcote, Bedfordshire, England. It became a listed building on 23 January 1961.

== See also ==
- Grade I listed buildings in Bedfordshire
