= Upper Gravenhurst =

Village in Bedfordshire, England

Coordinates: 52.01141°N 0.37851°W

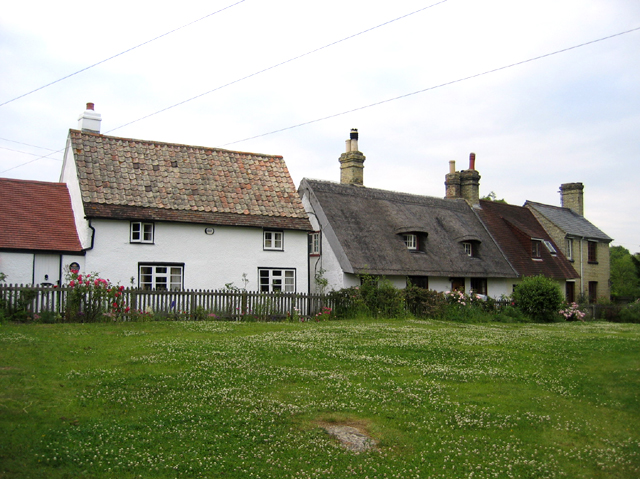
- Cottages in Upper Gravenhurst, viewed from the churchyard next to the church

- Location within Bedfordshire
- OS grid reference: TL113360
- Civil parish: Gravenhurst
- Unitary authority: Central Bedfordshire
- Ceremonial county: Bedfordshire
- Region: East
- Country: England
- Sovereign state: United Kingdom
- Post town: BEDFORD
- Postcode district: MK45
- Dialling code: 01462
- Police: Bedfordshire
- Fire: Bedfordshire
- Ambulance: East of England
- UK Parliament: Mid Bedfordshire

Upper Gravenhurst is a village in the civil parish of Gravenhurst, in the Central Bedfordshire district of Bedfordshire, England.

The Church of St Giles has been established in the village since the 12th Century. The first school in the village was built in 1870, today known as Gravenhurst Academy.

Upper Gravenhurst and neighbouring Lower Gravenhurst were historically separate parishes. They were merged into a single civil parish called Gravenhurst in 1888. At the 1881 census (the last before the abolition of the parish), Upper Gravenhurst had a population of 354.
