= Hulcote, Bedfordshire =

Village in Bedfordshire, England

Coordinates: 52.03433°N 0.61523°W

Hulcote
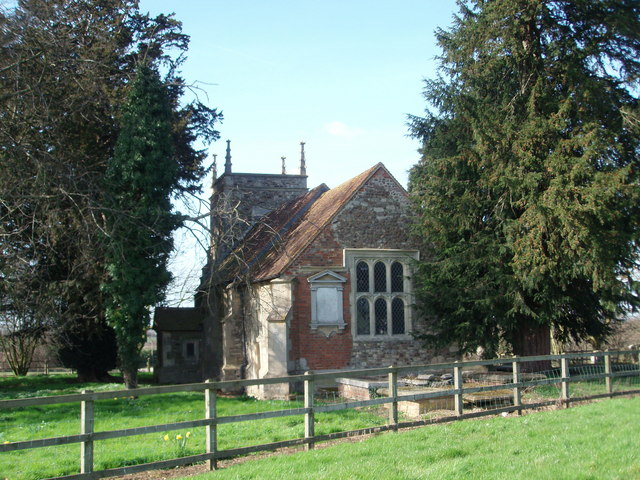
- Hulcote church

- Location within Bedfordshire
- OS grid reference: SP950382
- Civil parish: Hulcote and Salford
- Unitary authority: Central Bedfordshire
- Ceremonial county: Bedfordshire
- Region: East
- Country: England
- Sovereign state: United Kingdom
- Post town: MILTON KEYNES
- Postcode district: MK17
- Dialling code: 01908
- Police: Bedfordshire
- Fire: Bedfordshire
- Ambulance: East of England
- UK Parliament: Mid Bedfordshire

Hulcote, historically also spelt Holcot, is a village in the civil parish of Hulcote and Salford, in the Central Bedfordshire district of Bedfordshire, England. It is located directly to the north of the M1 motorway, and lies close to the border of the Milton Keynes borough in Buckinghamshire.

Some evidence has been found indicating possible Neolithic, New Stone Age and Roman settlement in the area. It is known that Hulcote has been consistently occupied since the Middle Ages. Hulcote Mill and Hulcote Manor (now private houses) are both mentioned in the Domesday Book.

Hulcote was an ancient parish in the Manshead hundred of Bedfordshire. It has a church called St Nicholas. The ecclesiastical parish of Hulcote was united with neighbouring Salford in 1750. Salford and Hulcote were subsequently also merged for civil purposes in 1933, becoming a new civil parish called "Hulcote and Salford". At the 1931 census (the last before the abolition of the parish), Hulcote had a population of 39.

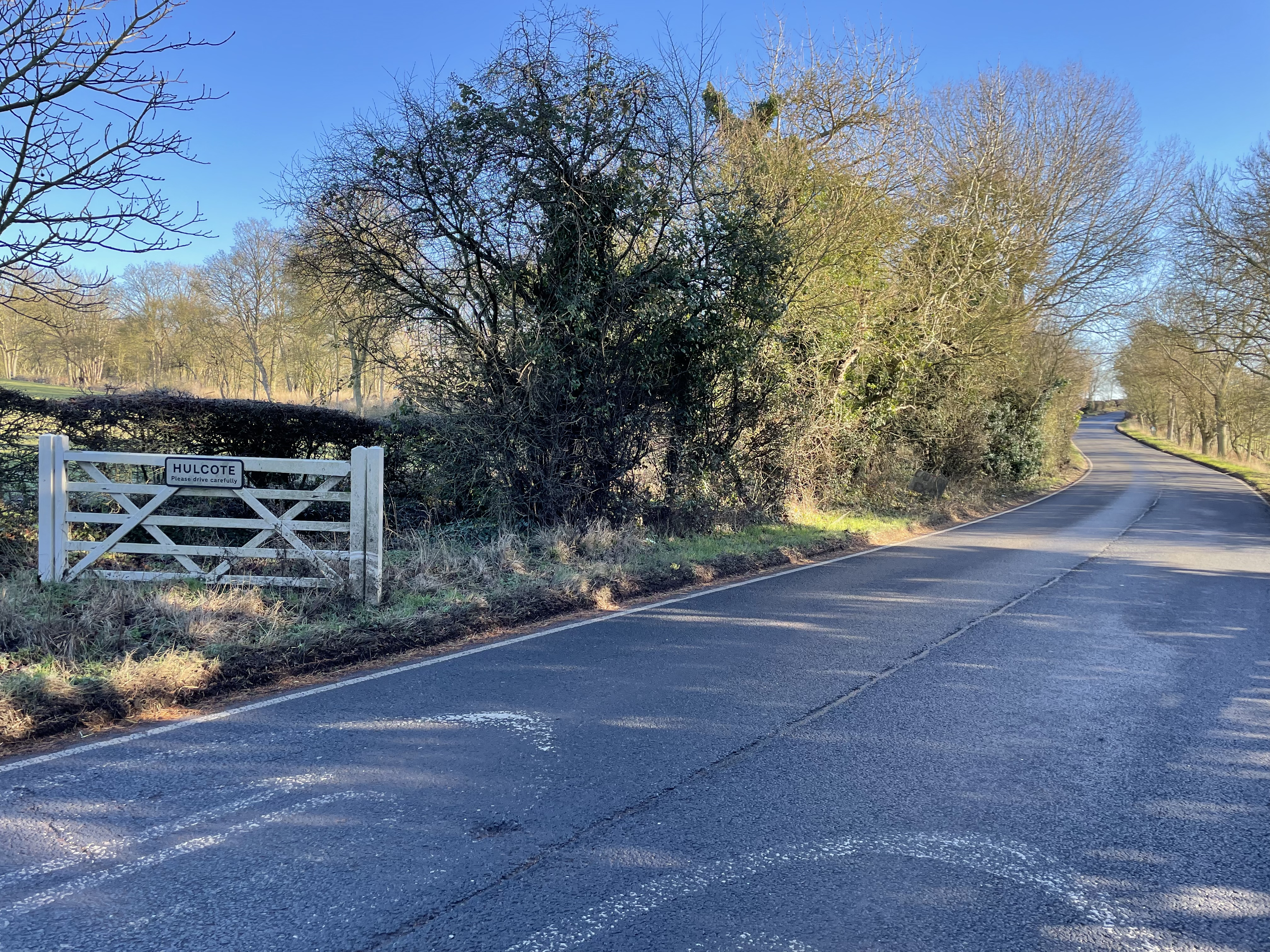
Approach to Hulcote village Bedfordshire
