= Moggerhanger =

Village in Bedfordshire, England

Coordinates: 52.130°N 0.334°W

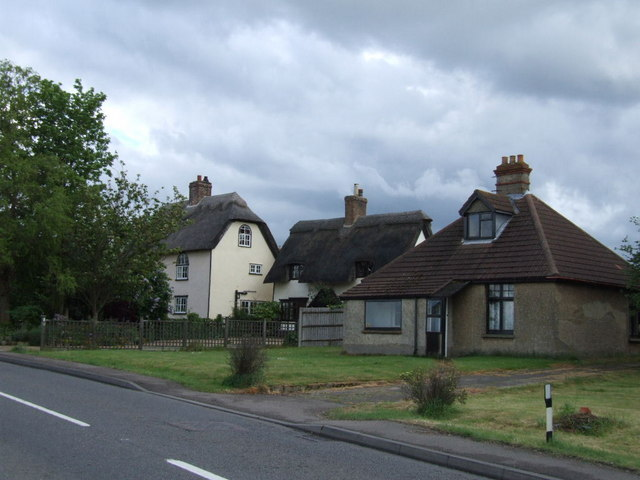

- Location within Bedfordshire
- Population: 636 (2001); 620 (2011 Census)
- Civil parish: Moggerhanger
- Unitary authority: Central Bedfordshire
- Ceremonial county: Bedfordshire
- Region: East
- Country: England
- Sovereign state: United Kingdom
- Post town: Bedford
- Postcode district: MK44
- Dialling code: 01767
- Police: Bedfordshire
- Fire: Bedfordshire
- Ambulance: East of England
- UK Parliament: Mid Bedfordshire

Moggerhanger is a village in the English county of Bedfordshire. It is west of Sandy on the road to Bedford. Its population in 2001 was 636, but had reduced to 620 at the 2011 Census. In the twentieth century the village name was spelled variously as: Moggerhanger, Mogerhanger, Muggerhanger and Morehanger. Local pronunciation of the name is as Morhanger.

== History ==
The civil parish name was known as Mogerhanger until April 2019, when the name was officially brought in line with that of the village. The parish includes the hamlet of Chalton which is mentioned in the Domesday Book of 1086, where it is listed amongst the lands held by Adeliza, wife of Hugh de Grandmesnil, on behalf of the King. The land consisted of a mill, meadow for 10 ploughs and woodland for 16 pigs. This was said to be an outlying area of Potton which was held by the King's niece, Countess Judith.

== The Man of Mog ==
in 1864 a young cobbler and his wife moved into moggerhanger to begin a life. While working one day he came home to find his wife with the doctor for more than just a check up. In a rage the man went on a massacre ultimately coming to an end when overpowered by the local locksmith. While trying to reach authorities the cobbler was left tied up. When they arrived and went to get the cobbler he was gone, never to be found. Some say they see him wandering the streets till this day.
