= Gravenhurst, Bedfordshire =

Civil parish in Bedfordshire, England

Coordinates: 52°N 0.366667°W

Gravenhurst
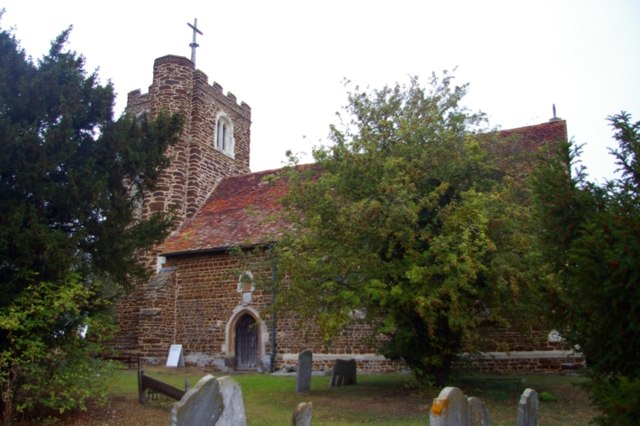
- St Mary's church

- Location within Bedfordshire
- Population: 595 (2011 Census)
- OS grid reference: TL121143
- Unitary authority: Central Bedfordshire
- Ceremonial county: Bedfordshire
- Region: East
- Country: England
- Sovereign state: United Kingdom
- Post town: BEDFORD
- Postcode district: MK45
- Dialling code: 01462
- Police: Bedfordshire
- Fire: Bedfordshire
- Ambulance: East of England
- UK Parliament: Mid Bedfordshire

Gravenhurst is a civil parish located in the Central Bedfordshire district of Bedfordshire, England.

The parish includes Lower Gravenhurst, Upper Gravenhurst, as well as the hamlet of Ion.

Features of Gravenhurst include St. Mary's Church, which was built during the 14th century.

== History ==
Gravenhurst was recorded in the Domesday Book as Crauenhest. The entry reads: Crauenhest: William from Hugh de Beauchamp. The parish was formed on 24 March 1888 from "Lower Gravenhurst" and "Upper Gravenhurst".

== Education ==
It is in the catchment zone for Robert Bloomfield Academy.
