= Hockliffe =

Village in Bedfordshire, England

Coordinates: 51.9311°N 0.5865°W

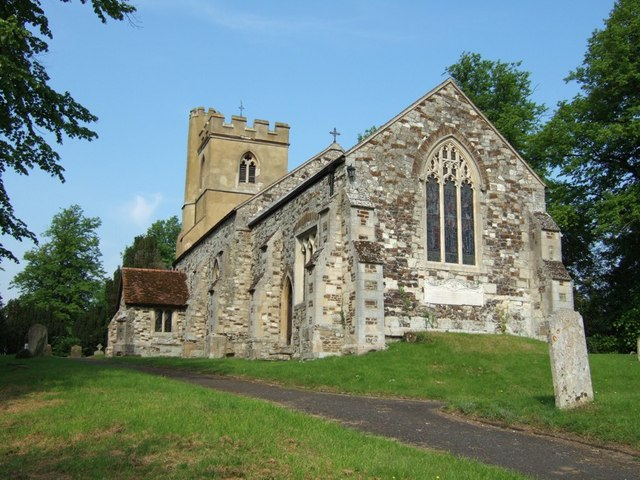
- St Nicholas parish church

- Location within Bedfordshire
- Population: 1,068 (parish)
- OS grid reference: SP972267
- Unitary authority: Central Bedfordshire
- Ceremonial county: Bedfordshire
- Region: East
- Country: England
- Sovereign state: United Kingdom
- Post town: LEIGHTON BUZZARD
- Postcode district: LU7
- Dialling code: 01525
- Police: Bedfordshire
- Fire: Bedfordshire
- Ambulance: East of England
- UK Parliament: South West Bedfordshire

Hockliffe is a village and civil parish in Bedfordshire, on the crossroads of the A5 road which lies upon the course of the Roman road known as Watling Street and the A4012 and B5704 roads.

It is about 4 miles (6.4 km) east of Leighton Buzzard. Nearby places are Heath and Reach, Eggington, Stanbridge, Battlesden, Toddington, Tebworth and Tilsworth.

Hockliffe is in Heath and Reach ward which sends a councillor to Central Bedfordshire Council. The ward includes the villages of Heath and Reach, Hockliffe, Eggington, Stanbridge, Tilsworth, Tebworth and Wingrave. The ward was created in 2011 and has since been represented by Councillor Mark Versallion.

== Clipstone Brook ==
There was a term applied from the 18th century which was "as straight as Hockley Brook" because of the meandering bends of the said brook. The correct name of the brook is the Clipstone Brook. The first field (though in the parish of Chalgrave) is still known by locals as the Old Ride, due to the original crossing of the brook of the original Woburn Road the later road being constructed in the 19th century through to the second Battlesden road turning near to the village of Milton Bryan. The new Woburn Road is about a 100 yards to the west from the said crossing and is now used by farm vehicles over a newer bridge. The second field was known as Horseshoe Corner as the brook was shaped like a horseshoe before it was straightened out by a farmer after the Second World War.

Recently there have been regular sightings of the invasive signal crayfish, Pacifastacus leniusculus, in the brook. It was noted in the local newspaper, The Leighton Buzzard Observer, that one was found inside a toy lobster during a clear out of a section of the brook near Leighton Buzzard in 2009.

== Hockliffe Radio Station ==
During the Second World War a Czechoslovak military intelligence wireless transmission station was situated just outside Hockliffe. The station was constructed by the Special Operations Executive in 1942 exclusively for Czech intelligence services. The station was used to contact Czech embassies in such countries as Portugal, Sweden, Switzerland and Turkey. Eleven men operated the station until June 1945, when they were able to return to their country.

== Education ==
The education authority, for the Leighton Buzzard area, since September 2019, calculates distances from each residence to the nearest lower school (in most circumstances) and uses that to determine priority admissions; the education authority uses computer systems to do this. Designated catchment zones are, as of 2024, no longer used for lower schools in the Leighton Buzzard area. Hockliffe is among the areas under this admissions regime.

== Notable people ==
During the 18th century Dr. William Dodd became rector of Hockliffe; he was later convicted of forgery and hanged at Tyburn.

Hockliffe is the birthplace of Arthur Henry Neumann (1850–1907), a British explorer, hunter, soldier and travel writer, famous for his exploits in Equatorial East Africa at the end of the 19th century. In 1898, he published Elephant Hunting in East Equatorial Africa that contained descriptions of his childhood in Hockliffe.

Hockliffe was the birthplace of John Atcheler (1791–1867), who described himself as Horse Slaughterer to Queen Victoria.
