= Steppingley =

Village in Bedfordshire, England

Coordinates: 52.0075°N 0.528333°W

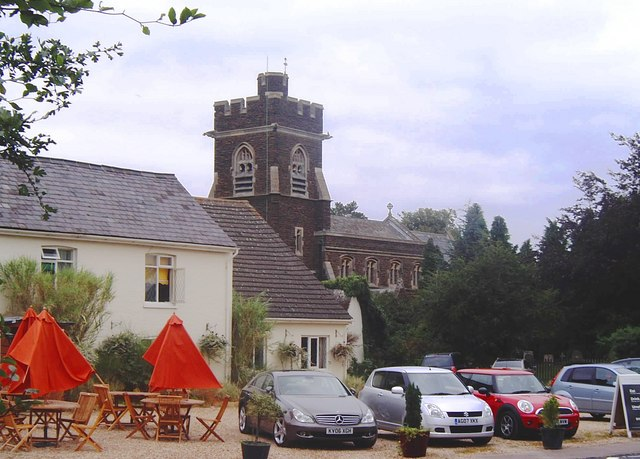

- Location within Bedfordshire
- Population: 233 (2001); 236 (2011 Census)
- OS grid reference: TL010013
- Civil parish: Steppingley
- Unitary authority: Central Bedfordshire
- Ceremonial county: Bedfordshire
- Region: East
- Country: England
- Sovereign state: United Kingdom
- Post town: BEDFORD
- Postcode district: MK45
- Dialling code: 01525
- Police: Bedfordshire
- Fire: Bedfordshire
- Ambulance: East of England
- UK Parliament: Mid Bedfordshire

Steppingley is a rural village and civil parish in Bedfordshire, England. It stands on high ground in the centre of a small parish of about 562 ha on the Greensand Ridge and is mentioned in the Domesday Book. It is located close to the nearby towns of Ampthill, Flitwick and Woburn, Bedfordshire.

Much of the surrounding land is part of either Beckerings Park, or the Woburn Estate. The Duke of Bedford influence can be seen in the characteristic style of the numerous workers cottages throughout the village.

It also has good transport links to the M1 (close to junctions 12 and 13) and the Thameslink trainline to London (45 mins to St Pancras) is accessible at nearby Flitwick station (2 miles).

The Steppingley Parish website provides additional information relating to the village:
