= Hulcote and Salford =

- Civil parish
- Interactive map of Hulcote and Salford
- Coordinates: 52.043°N 0.631°W
- Country: England
- Primary council: Central Bedfordshire
- County: Bedfordshire
- Region: East of England
- Status: Parish
- Main settlements: Hulcote; Salford

Government
  - Type: Parish Council
  - UK Parliament: Mid Bedfordshire

Population (2011)
  - Total: 209
- Postal code: MK17
- Area code: MK

Hulcote and Salford is a civil parish in the district of Central Bedfordshire in the county of Bedfordshire. The parish was formed in 1933 by the union of the civil parishes of Hulcote and Salford. Until 1974 the parish was part of the Ampthill rural district.

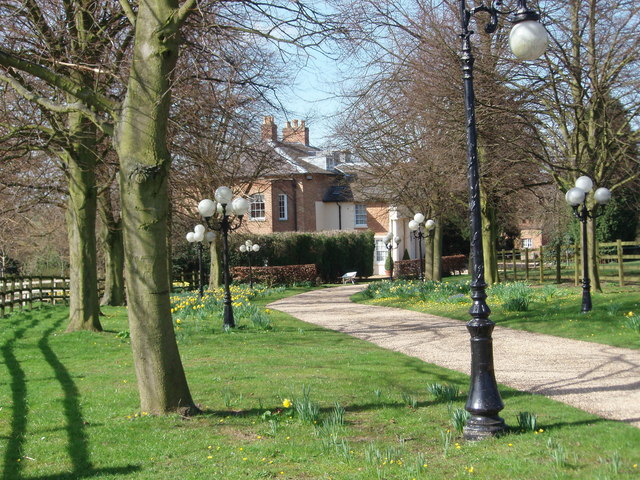
Hulcote Manor
