= Salford, Bedfordshire =

Village in Bedfordshire, England

Coordinates: 52.04415°N 0.63738°W

Salford
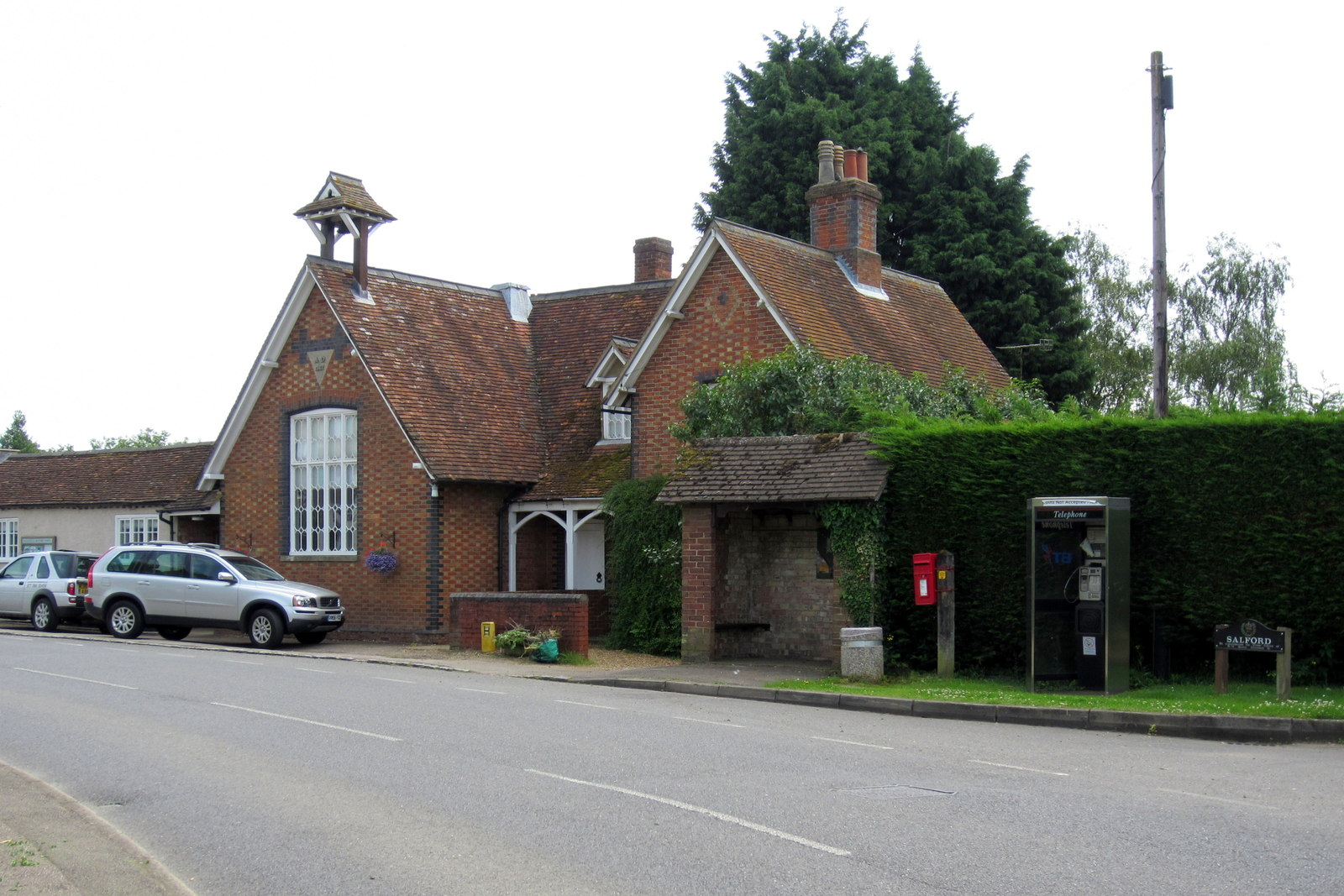
- Salford village hall

- Location within Bedfordshire
- Interactive map of Salford
- OS grid reference: SP935392
- Civil parish: Hulcote and Salford
- Unitary authority: Central Bedfordshire
- Ceremonial county: Bedfordshire
- Region: East
- Country: England
- Sovereign state: United Kingdom
- Post town: MILTON KEYNES
- Postcode district: MK17
- Dialling code: 01908
- Police: Bedfordshire
- Fire: Bedfordshire
- Ambulance: East of England
- UK Parliament: Mid Bedfordshire

Salford (/ˈsæfərd/) is a village in the civil parish of Hulcote and Salford, in the Central Bedfordshire district of Bedfordshire, England. It is located near the large new town of Milton Keynes and the M1 motorway. The Church of St Mary the Virgin is in the village.

Salford and Hulcote were historically separate parishes. They were merged into the new civil parish of Hulcote and Salford in 1933. At the 1931 census (the last before the abolition of the parish), Salford had a population of 133.
