= Westoning =

Village in Bedfordshire, England

Coordinates: 51.981831°N 0.496405°W

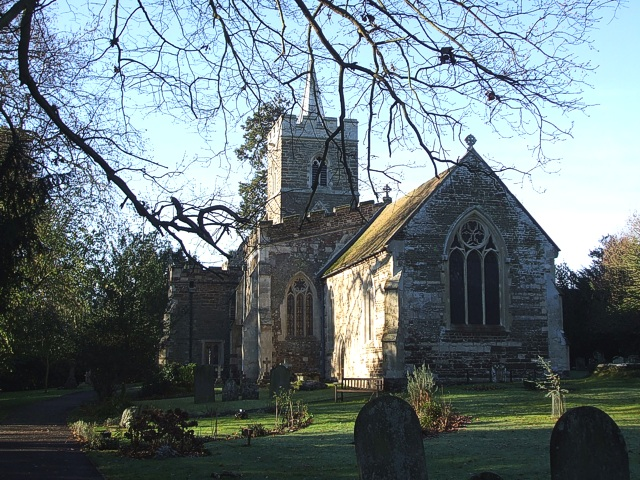
- St Mary Magdalene Church

- Location within Bedfordshire
- Population: 2,001 (2001); 2,147 (2011 Census)
- OS grid reference: TL035325
- Civil parish: Westoning
- Unitary authority: Central Bedfordshire
- Ceremonial county: Bedfordshire
- Region: East
- Country: England
- Sovereign state: United Kingdom
- Post town: BEDFORD
- Postcode district: MK45
- Dialling code: 01525
- Police: Bedfordshire
- Fire: Bedfordshire
- Ambulance: East of England
- UK Parliament: Mid Bedfordshire

Westoning (/ˈwɛstənɪŋ/) is a village and civil parish in Bedfordshire, England. It is located around 0.5 miles (0.8 km) south of the town of Flitwick. The River Flit flows behind the Westoning stud farm.

== History ==
=== Dark and Middle Ages ===
==== 1086 ====
The village is mentioned in the Domesday Book of 1086; men in the village (as heads of household or serfs) numbered 16 villagers (villeins), 3 smallholders and 4 slaves (serfs). Cultivated land amounted to 14 ploughlands (land for) two lord's plough teams, five men's plough teams. Other resources were 2.0 ploughs of lord's lands (private parkland), seven ploughs of meadow and woodland worth 400 pigs (annual turnover of swine livestock). The head manor was Hitchin, which was owned by the King.

==== Name ====
Alternative names of the village in this period were Weston (11th century), Weston Tregoz (early 14th century) and Weston Inge (14th century); these are documented in such documents as Patent Rolls of the King's letters patent. The spelling Weston Hyng may be a further alternative, used in 1396.

==== Early history of Weston Manor, later Weston Tregoz Manor and finally Westoning Manor ====
The manor first left complete royal demesne, with the unfettered right to appoint mesne lords, in 1173 when the King granted the estate worth £15 per year to Roger de Sanford who three years later owed 5 marks for default (of the annual knight's fee) to the King. His executors negotiated a notified Release of it to William de Buckland who paid £100 to effectively be seized of the whole village, save the churchlands; (Note: The source, cited by Page, reads: for the seisin of the vill) in 1216 his son-in-law, Robert de Ferrar, inherited. His son-in-law was to receive it by a family settlement yet this man named William d'Avrenches died before 1230 and his son before 1235, thus the lands descended to Hamon de Crevecœur via a daughter, followed by his son William and his widow Mabel who later married John Tregoz (before her death in 1297).

Three co-heirs followed, the family of William de Crevecœur's three sisters (Agnes, Isolda and Eleanor). Agnes's share descended to Juliana de Weylondon, the other two-thirds were purchased by 1299 by an acquisitive William Inge. He enhanced his portion of the manor by gaining in 1303 a Royal Licence on his portion to hold a weekly market and annual fair. Five years later Inge acquired the remaining third of the Weston Manor.

Inge was Chief Justice of the King's Bench in the reign of Edward II, and in 1310 received a grant of 100 marks as recompense for wages and horses lost by him in his Scottish war.

By 1371 the lands (and the manorial rights) passed to William la Zouche, son of Joan, daughter and heir of William Inge, Lords of the Manor of Eaton Bray; this line ran both estates until 1525–26 when a later William la Zouche died during the Wars of the Roses.

==== Early history of Aynells Manor ====
John Aynell held this manor directly of the King in the mid-fourteenth century. By 1418 it was held by John Shathewell of Priestley and Isabel his wife and in 1480 descended from Thomas Rufford to his son, and then in turn, his son, who in 1541 released all of the rights and land to Gonville and Caius College, Cambridge. This land in 1543 was described as "a messuage with certain lands called Aynells, on which was a charge of 10s. payable to Westoning Chantry", which had been endowed with land by a prominent lord of the main manor in 1314, William Inge. In 1708 the college paid "An outrent to the king, 10s." The last item represents the 10s. formerly paid to Westoning chantry before its dissolution. The Dissolution of the Chantries (Note: Begun under the Dissolution of Colleges Act 1547, under Edward VI, which instead set up a pension for the chantry priests) took place in 1549, at which time the priest of the chantry in the church was described as 'but meanly [averagely] learned, not able to serve a cure [of souls] and hath no other living but this chantry.'

==== Rectory ====
The rectory of Westoning was transferred by the Crown from the Nunnery at Elstow Abbey to Thomas Hungate and Simon Aynesworth in 1550. Until the beginning of the 19th century the rectory shared the history of Westoning Manor, when Francis Penyston was impropriator of the rectorial tithes (and thus liability) and they passed to his daughter, who held them in 1836 and in 1912 they were vested in the Penyston trustees.

==== Remaining estates ====
Younges Manor, mostly in Westoning, is recorded for the first time in 1682, when it was held by Henrietta Wentworth, 6th Baroness Wentworth with her manor of Toddington. These lands descended with Toddington up to the beginning of the 19th century but all trace of it is lost after 1803.

At the time of the dissolution, Woburn Abbey held lands in Westoning with an annual value of £2 18s. 2½d., but no further mention of this property has been found.

Mention occurs of a water mill in an extent (survey document of the extent) of Westoning Manor made in 1297, and in 1322 two mills are found attached to the manor. Another extent dated fifty years later again mentions one mill, then worth nothing, and reference is found to it in a document as late as 1615. However no mills were in the parish in 1912.

=== Post Dissolution of the Monasteries/Reformation ===
Henry VIII summoned a later La Zouche as lord of the manor in 1533 to show on what (e.g. annual) service his ancestors held the manor. He proved that the manor was and always had been held of the king by great serjeanty, accordingly paid £4 for relief from the next services due. In 1542 the la Zouche family surrendered the estate to the Crown in exchange for a Royal one in Derbyshire (Note: See also Baron Zouche) and Henry had it attached to the Royal Honor of Ampthill.

Around 1555 Mary I granted Westoning Manor to Mary Curzon. She married Sir George Fermor, and the manor descended in their family to Sir Hatton Fermor and then Sir William Fermor, colonel of horse for the King in the Civil War. On the restoration his title was restored, afterwards succeeded by his son who represented Northampton and became Baron Leominster, in turn whose son inherited Westoning in 1711 and became Earl of Pomfret or Pontefract in 1722.

In the 17th century Westoning was inhabited by the wandering religious man, and an early Baptist forefather John Bunyan, who wrote The Pilgrim's Progress; he was arrested on 12 November 1660 shortly after the restricted religious rights introduced on the Restoration of the Monarchy for preaching privately in Lower Samsell in the village.

John Everitt purchased the manor in 1767, whose son of the same name was knighted, another of the same name held it until he died in 1836, after which his executors sold the property to Reverend J. W. C. Campion in whose family it remained until Major Coventry Campion (Note: See above) died in 1903 to be purchased from his widow, later Mrs Blyth-King, by the Spensley family.

=== Post-Industrial Revolution ===
Westoning has varied soil, on a subsoil of strong clay, which was in this period worked in a claypit disused by 1912 at Westoning Wood End, for the manufacture of bricks, these works being in the south of the parish close by the Midland Main Line (shared with Thameslink).

Westoning made news headlines on 11 September 1976 when, at 07:10, a Texaco petrol tanker overturned in the High Street. The tanker subsequently caught fire and exploded, destroying eight houses. Twenty-one people were made homeless and over a hundred more were evacuated from their homes. No civilians were injured in the blast but three members of the Bedfordshire Fire Service—Roy Leonard, Denis Regan and Richard King—were seriously injured when the fire engine they were travelling in, responding to the incident, crashed and overturned, finishing upside down in a ditch. Denis Regan's career was cut short owing to injuries he received from the accident and was forced into immediate retirement. Eyewitness accounts state that petrol seeped into the surface water drainage system and cast iron inspection covers were blown into the air when the fire spread and ignited the petrol vapour in the drains.

Westoning is protected from further development and expansion due to being bordered by green belt land as a green buffer on all sides and by the M1 motorway. The village has, however, seen substantial development throughout the last century with new developments including the roads: Highfields, Home Farm Way, and Manor Park Drive. Since 2000, Westoning Manor house was redeveloped into expensive and exclusive flats – most of its grounds were at the same time developed into very large four and five bedroom detached houses. Howard Spensley in 1912 owned it, then a comparatively modern building of brick and stone, although a large quantity of old woodwork he said was taken from the house at Wrest Park, on its construction being demolished, and from the old Palace of Westminster, incorporated in the design of many of the rooms and staircases. The moated site of the earlier manor is to its southwest, and a second manor was southwest of the village centre by Westoning Wood End Farm.

== Demography ==
Westoning has an approximate population of 2,001 (based on 2001 statistics) and its average income level is above the national average.

== Governance ==
The village is represented on the Central Bedfordshire Council; it forms part of the Westoning and Tingrith ward and has its own civil parish council who meet to decide on local matters.

== Culture and community ==
=== Community facilities ===
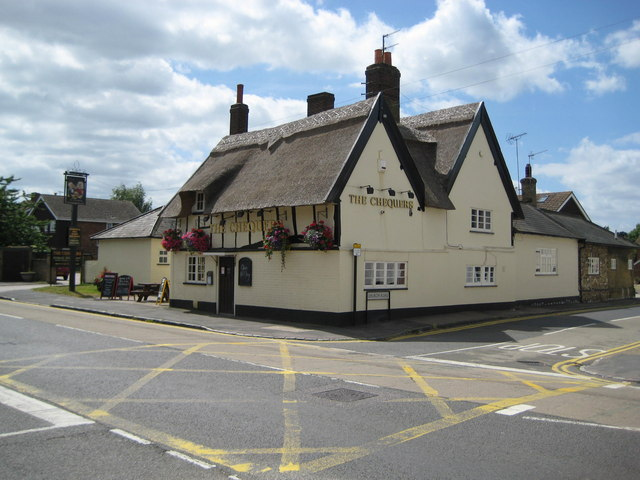
The Chequers, on Park Road

In the high street is the small joint Post Office and newsagent with a traditional village butcher's shop opposite. A children's park is fenced off from the rest of the recreation ground which provides various playground apparatus for young children.

The village has two public houses and a social club, Westoning Recreation Club (situated at the recreation ground on Greenfield Road). The pubs are The Chequers, a half-timber and thatch building of 18th-century date, and The Bell, an 18th-century brick and tile house that had its sign displayed from an old oak standing by the roadside. On Park Road and Greenfield Road respectively. At the top of Sampshill Road, Billington's Car Company have their storage area for stock. Flitvale Garden Centre is located just within the boundary on the road to Flitwick.

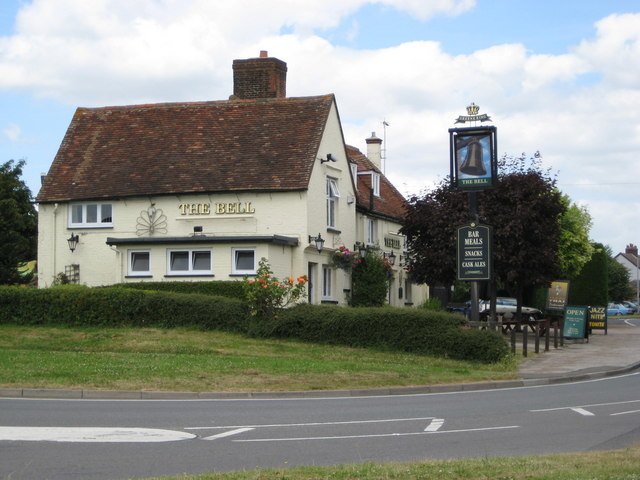
The Bell, on Greenfield Road

The recreational facilities include Westoning Football Club, Westoning Tennis Club and the club holds a regular village tournament between its members.

Westoning Village Hall is situated in Church Road and stages regular productions by the village's amateur dramatic society, the Westoning Players. The building dates back to the 1840s and has a long and colourful history of village life. The village hall also runs a pre-school service.

Westoning Lower School is situated in the heart in the village and is known for its many social occasions that include performances such as country dancing. Many performances are conducted at the village fair.

Westoning Recreation Club holds an annual event to serve as a fund raising event for the football, the tennis, its other sports and the Lower School. For the past few years this annual event has been a "Donkey Derby". The Recreation Club also holds real ale festivals twice a year, other events include a summer fête and church fête which are held within the recreation ground and vicarage grounds respectively.

=== Folklore ===
Westoning is the location of "An Execution and a Miracle", a 12th Century legend. In the tale, a man named Fulke had refused to pay his rent of one denarius to a local farmer, Ailward or Eilward. On an upcoming holiday, Ailward suggested that Fulke should repay half his debt in settlement and keep the rest for drinking, but Fulke refused. Ailward flew into a rage and headed for Fulke's house where he broke in and he seized a grindstone and a pair of gloves, but Fulke followed him, broke his head open, stabbed him in the arm, bound him, and, at the suggestion of the local beadle, accused him of stealing many more objects. Found guilty at his trial, Ailward was sent to the ducking pond where he would be found guilty if he floated and innocent if he sank (and drowned). Ailward floated, was deemed guilty, and was left at the side of the road, castrated and his eyes gouged out. A local farmer found him and took him home. After days of praying to St Thomas Becket, Ailward's eyes and testicles grew back (though his eyes were different colours and his testicles were smaller than they had been before). He devoted the rest of his years to St. Thomas. A slightly amended, animated version of the legend has been produced online. The story is told in a set of early thirteenth century stained glass windows at Canterbury Cathedral, which were borrowed for display in the British Museum for the exhibition commemorating the 851st anniversary of Becket's murder in 2021 (delayed from 850th in 2020 due to the COVID-19 pandemic).

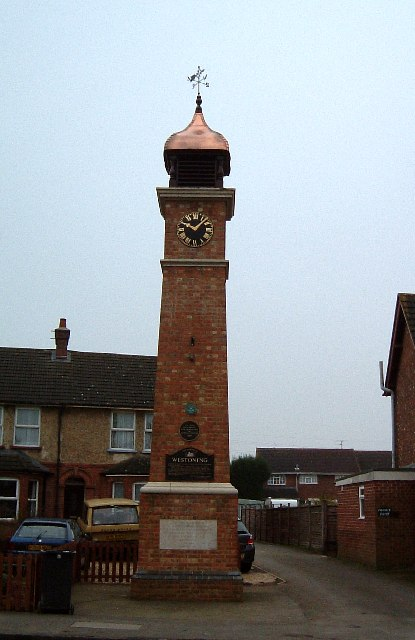
Westoning Clock Tower

== Transport ==
Flitwick is 1.95 miles (3.14 km) northeast of junction 12 of the M1 motorway, and beside the railway line from Brighton and London to Bedford which has a direct connection to Scotland via Leicester. The nearest railway station is in Harlington, 1.3 miles (2.1 km) south. Flitwick station is 1.4 miles (2.3 km) north.

== Landmarks ==
Major Coventry Campion had built the Clock Tower of brick and stone to mark the Golden Jubilee of Queen Victoria. This was derelict for many years but was restored as part of the year 2000 millennium celebrations.

== Notable people ==
- John Bunyan, writer and Puritan preacher
- Nadine Dorries, Conservative MP
- Sir David Robinson, lived at Westoning Manor
- Bryn West, cricketer

== Notes and references ==
Notes
