= Aspley Heath =

Village in Bedfordshire, England

Coordinates: 52.006°N 0.651°W

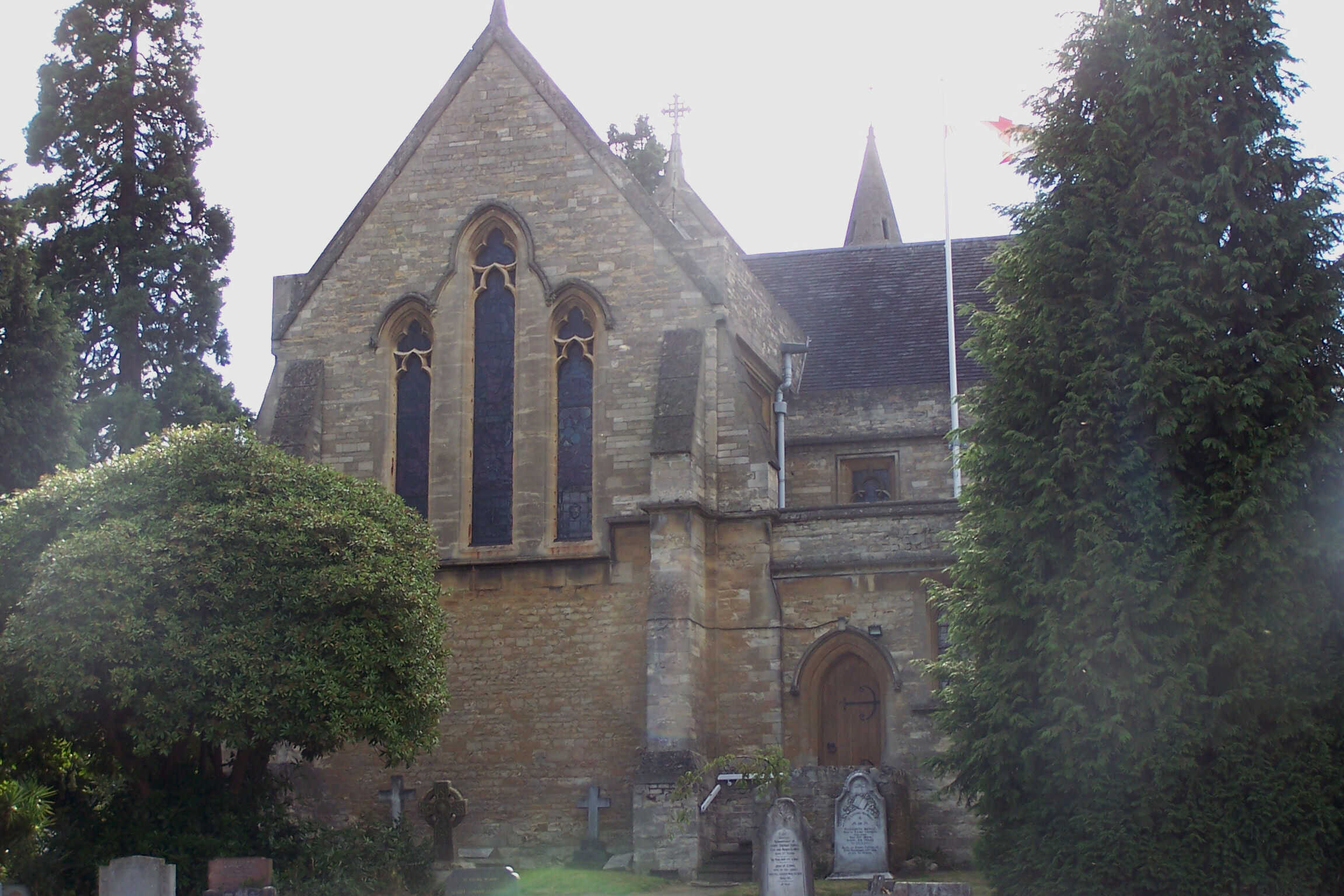
- St Michael's Church

- Location within Bedfordshire
- Interactive map of Aspley Heath
- Population: 578 (2011 Census)
- OS grid reference: SP926353
- Unitary authority: Central Bedfordshire
- Ceremonial county: Bedfordshire
- Region: East
- Country: England
- Sovereign state: United Kingdom
- Post town: MILTON KEYNES
- Postcode district: MK17
- Police: Bedfordshire
- Fire: Bedfordshire
- Ambulance: East of England
- Website: aspleyheathparishcouncil.org

Aspley Heath is a village and civil parish in the Central Bedfordshire district of Bedfordshire, England.

The village is a linear settlement. It adjoins Woburn Sands, which is part of the City of Milton Keynes in Buckinghamshire; Aspley Guise lies northeast, Woburn is to the south, and Bow Brickhill and Little Brickhill to the west and south west respectively. The Office for National Statistics includes the village in the Milton Keynes Built-up area.

Aspley Heath village was designated a conservation area in 1994. In 2009, Mid Bedfordshire District Council published an appraisal of the conservation area, which stated Aspley Heath is "characterised by large detached houses set in extensive grounds". Church Road is described as being bordered by hedgerows of holly.

St Michael's Church is the parish church. The ecclesiastical parish is named Woburn Sands and officially came into existence on 4 November 1867, prior to the formation of Aspley Heath civil parish. The land was provided by the Duke of Bedford. The architect was Henry Clutton, who also designed St Mary's Church, Woburn. Consecration of the church and the churchyard took place on 22 September 1868 and was presided over by Harold Browne, the Bishop of Ely. The coursed limestone church building is Grade II* listed and features many windows with "curious" tracery.

A National School existed in the village by 1863 and became a board school upon the establishment of the Aspley Heath School Board in 1885. It became a council school following the passing of the Education Act, 1902 and finally closed in 1981. The Knoll Preparatory School operated from 1891 to 1974 in a what was previously a private residence in woodland at the far end of the village. The building reverted to a private dwelling after the school closed and was later converted into apartments.

The Heath was used as a pasture for grazing sheep at its inclosure in 1761. In May 1874, Dr Prior, medical officer of the local Board of Health said that Aspley Heath used to be "a wild stretch of elevated ground, largely covered in ling, and tenanted by a few squatters, who occupied huts of a most primitive description". His report set out the room dimensions of two cottages, reported a lack of adequate ventilation for the number of occupants, and stated that water was supplied by a well 200 yards distant. Dr Prior reported in 1878 that one family was living in a railway carriage on a secluded part of the heath; he certified the residence unfit for habitation. In a retrospective The Fenny Stratford Times of 8 March 1883 said the squatters were the poor of Aspley parish, who were refused aid and had been directed to look for sustenance on the heath by working the natural materials there – digging sandstone, fuller's earth and peat, and felling fir poles – and to make themselves homes and grow vegetables on their plots. In 1883 at a public meeting held to discuss the future governance of Aspley Heath, it was shown that only three poor persons remained on the heath, that plots had been bought by the wealthy, and legal means were being pursued to remove the few remaining cottagers.

The village has two public houses, the Fir Tree Inn and The Royal Oak. The Fir Tree Inn dates back to 1829. It was owned by Allfrey & Lovell, a Newport Pagnell brewery from 1876 and was taken over by Bedford brewers, Charles Wells in 1927. The earliest recorded licensee of The Royal Oak is from 1876. It was owned by Newland & Nash, Bedford brewers from 1890 then Wells and Winch of Biggleswade from 1922 until that brewery was taken over by Greene King in 1961.

The parish is elevated and small in population and area. The open landscape of Wavendon Heath was transformed by the planting of thousands of Scotch firs in the last quarter of the 18th century. Aspley Heath civil parish was created in 1883; prior to this the area was part of Aspley Guise parish. (Note: Technically a hamlet of the parish which was Anglican and had civil roles in charity and social functions - see civil parishes in England) Three years after its creation, Aspley Heath parish was extended to 600 acres (240 ha) by a transfer of land from Wavendon parish.

== Historical population ==
Population of Aspley Heath parish taken from national censuses.

Population growth in Aspley Heath 1891–1971
| Year | Pop. | ±% |
|---|---|---|
| 1891 | 451 | — |
| 1901 | 462 | +2.4% |
| 1911 | 572 | +23.8% |
| 1921 | 522 | −8.7% |
| 1931 | 499 | −4.4% |
| 1951 | 460 | −7.8% |
| 1961 | 490 | +6.5% |
| 1971 | 579 | +18.2% |
Source: A Vision of Britain through Time

== Notes and references ==
Notes
