= Ridgmont =

Village in Bedfordshire, England

Coordinates: 52°00′53″N 0°34′47″W

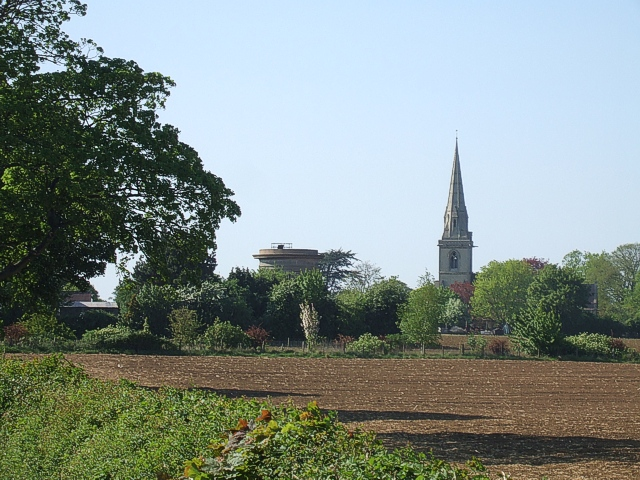

- Location within Bedfordshire
- Interactive map of Ridgmont
- Population: 411 (2011 Census)
- OS grid reference: SP975360
- Civil parish: Ridgmont
- Unitary authority: Central Bedfordshire
- Ceremonial county: Bedfordshire
- Region: East
- Country: England
- Sovereign state: United Kingdom
- Post town: BEDFORD
- Postcode district: MK43
- Dialling code: 01525
- Police: Bedfordshire
- Fire: Bedfordshire
- Ambulance: East of England

Ridgmont is a small village and civil parish in Bedfordshire, England. It is located beside junction 13 of the M1 motorway, and close to Milton Keynes and Woburn Abbey. The 2001 census states the total population to be 418, reducing to 411 at the 2011 Census.

The parish is first mentioned in the Domesday Book of 1086, by its original name of Segenhoe, which was approximately 500 yards (metres) southeast from where the village now lies. In 1227 the name Rugemund was first recorded, taken from the French 'rouge mont' which means red hill.

The modern village lies on top of a greensand ridge at approximately 350 feet (110 m) above sea level. The surrounding valley has underlying 'Upper Jurassic Oxford Clay' which is suitable for making bricks. In 1935 the Ridgmont Brickworks were built by the Ridgmont Fletton Brick Company. By 1979, as part of the London Brick Company, the works had 25 chimneys and was said to be the second-largest brickworks in the world.

The large Amazon.co.uk warehouse now occupies the site of the former brickworks, which is situated beside the Ridgmont railway station.

November 2006 saw work start on the Ridgmont Bypass, and the £15.5 million project was finished in June 2008. The A507 Ridgmont relief road is designed to carry 80 per cent of heavy traffic away from the neighbouring villages.
