= Tilsworth =

Village in Bedfordshire, England

Coordinates: 51.9096°N 0.5783°W

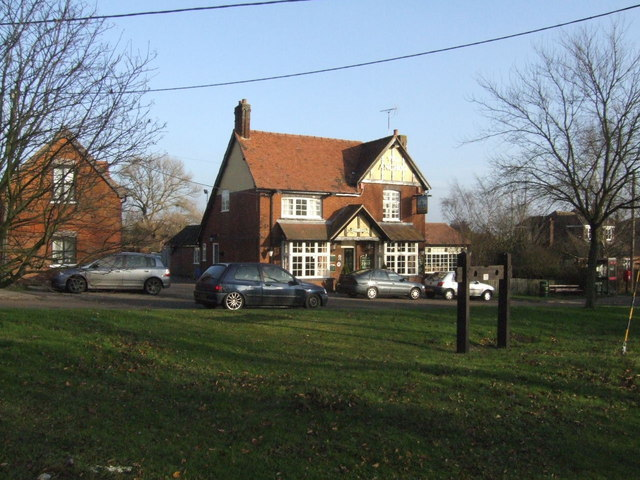
- The Anchor public house

- Location within Bedfordshire
- Population: 372
- OS grid reference: SP979244
- Civil parish: Tilsworth
- Unitary authority: Central Bedfordshire
- Ceremonial county: Bedfordshire
- Region: East
- Country: England
- Sovereign state: United Kingdom
- Post town: LEIGHTON BUZZARD
- Postcode district: LU7
- Dialling code: 01525
- Police: Bedfordshire
- Fire: Bedfordshire
- Ambulance: East of England
- UK Parliament: South West Bedfordshire

Tilsworth is a small village and civil parish in Bedfordshire. It lies to the north west of Dunstable, and the Roman Watling Street (A5) forms the north east boundary of the parish of 1,200 acres (4.8 km^{2}). The village lies on the gault clay, where springs well up just south of a gentle gravelly ridge. A large proportion of the area is still farmland.

The Domesday Book calls the place "Pileworde" because of a misunderstanding of the symbol for "th", and the name probably means "Thyfel's homestead". A further alternative spelling is "Tyllesworth", in a legal record, dated 1470, mentioning Thomas Carter, a husbandman of the village.

Stanbridge, a larger village, is a close neighbour to the west and some organisations, such as the Women's Institute, are combined.

The medieval All Saints' Church, built of Totternhoe stone, stands in a prominent position on the hillside, and can be seen from a distance when floodlit at night. It has shared a vicar with Stanbridge since the 19th century, and the combined benefice now also includes Totternhoe. The Church House acts as a centre for many local organisations and there is an active community life in the village.

The Methodist Church, faced with the need for expensive repairs, was closed in 1990 and demolished.

Across the road from the church, on lower ground, is the ancient moated site of Tilsworth Manor (now a private house). The house itself has been much altered in modern times, but retains a picturesque 15th century gate tower. Tilsworth fête is held in the grounds each June. The manor was owned in the 16th century by the Fowler family. In 1600 a notorious trial followed a quarrel between Richard Fowler and his young wife. Richard was imprisoned in the Tower of London as the result of a forged letter implicating him in a plot to poison Queen Elizabeth I. His wife, her brother and her lover were convicted of the forgery.

A gravestone in the churchyard, bearing a verse inscription about a "female unknown" found murdered in the nearby woods in 1821, arouses much interest.

Several old farmhouses, two of them thatched, survive in Tilsworth. There are new houses and bungalows, but the village has not yet increased greatly in size. One farmhouse in the north corner of the parish was lost to Hockliffe, to which it was adjacent, in the 20th century. The "Little Chef" restaurant and Travelodge on the A5 are called "Hockliffe", though in fact they lie in Tilsworth.

A public house, the Anchor, with restaurant and garden, stands next to one of the small greens, and there is a golf and conference centre.

Tilsworth is part of the political ward of 'Heath and Reach' which sends a Councillor to Central Bedfordshire Council. The ward includes the villages of Heath and Reach, Hockliffe, Eggington, Stanbridge, Tilsworth, Tebworth and Wingrave. The ward was created in 2011 and has since been represented by Councillor Mark Versallion.

== See also ==
- Tilsworth Castle
