= Milton Bryan =

Village in Bedfordshire, England

Coordinates: 51.96416°N 0.58751°W

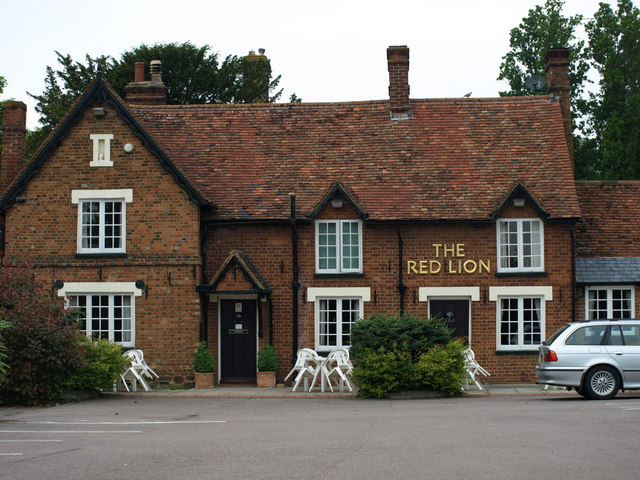
- The Red Lion public house

- Location within Bedfordshire
- Interactive map of Milton Bryan
- Population: 220 (2011 Census including Battlesden and Potsgrove)
- OS grid reference: SP970333
- Civil parish: Milton Bryan
- Unitary authority: Central Bedfordshire
- Ceremonial county: Bedfordshire
- Region: East
- Country: England
- Sovereign state: United Kingdom
- Post town: MILTON KEYNES
- Postcode district: MK17
- Dialling code: 01525
- Police: Bedfordshire
- Fire: Bedfordshire
- Ambulance: East of England
- UK Parliament: Mid Bedfordshire
- Website: miltonbryan.org

Milton Bryan is a village and civil parish located in Central Bedfordshire (the spelling Milton Bryant was previously common and is still recognised by postal services). It lies just off the A4012 road, near to its junction with the A5 at Hockliffe. The parish includes the ancient hamlets of Potsgrove & Battlesden. The village is best known for being the birthplace of Joseph Paxton, the designer of the Crystal Palace, who was born in Milton Bryan as the seventh son of a farming family along with its role in the Second World War.

== South End ==
The village is divided into two distinct areas: Church End and South End. South End includes the Red Lion pub and an attractive duck pond. A Methodist Chapel was built by the pond in the 19th century, resting on the banks of the pond and overhanging the pond supported on stilts.

== Church End ==
Church End includes St Peter's Church and the remains of a radio station (Soldatensender Calais) built in the Second World War to broadcast 'black propaganda' into Nazi Germany.

== St Peter's Church ==
St Peter's Church was initially a simple Norman structure with a chancel, nave and small timber bell turret, with a 15th-century east window, windows in the nave and doorways in chancel and nave. Then the Inglis family acquired the Milton Bryan Estate through marriage in 1784. The first major alterations took place in 1826 in memory of Sir Hugh Inglis, who had died in 1820, by his son Sir Robert Harry Inglis. A north transept was built and a family chapel over a vault, the architect seems to have been Sir Robert Smirke. A new tower and a porch were built in 1840–1841, designed by Lewis Nockalls Cottingham, the west window was reopened and a new west front gable were added. Ten years later a south transept was added at Sir Robert Harry Inglis' expense, after his death a stained glass window was installed in the north transept in 1857. Lady Paxton gave a stained glass window in 1867 in memory of her husband Sir Joseph Paxton, architect of the Crystal Palace, who was born in the village.

== Pond ==
In 1861, a chapel was built over the pond, supported by stilts and partially on land. This was a timber chapel with a slated roof which, at a squash, could seat up to 50 people. The interior was very simple and austere. During its life, the chapel was maintained meticulously by the villagers who ensured that the pews were kept polished and the wooden floor scrubbed. Very often, the sound of ducks under the chapel could be heard during the sermons and hymns. A plaque was placed by the pond to commemorate both the Millennium 2000 and the site of the former Milton Bryan Methodist Chapel.

== Surrounding area ==
The nearest town to Milton Bryan is Leighton Buzzard, closely followed by Dunstable. It is also a short distance away from the villages of Toddington and Woburn.
