= Husborne Crawley =

Village in Bedfordshire, England

Coordinates: 52.0113°N 0.60159°W

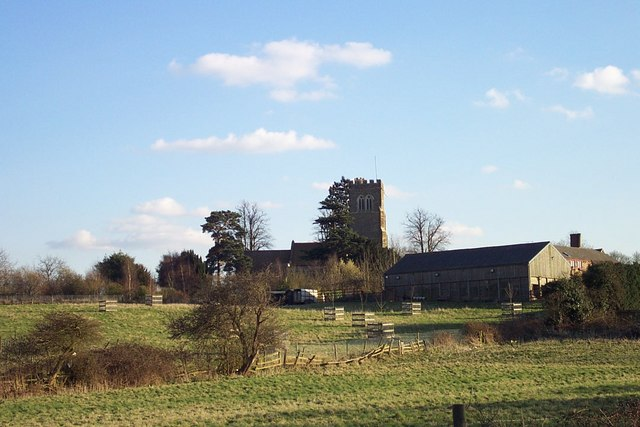
- St. James' Church

- Location within Bedfordshire
- Population: 237 (2011 Census)
- OS grid reference: SP 95444 36238
- Unitary authority: Central Bedfordshire
- Ceremonial county: Bedfordshire
- Region: East
- Country: England
- Sovereign state: United Kingdom
- Post town: BEDFORD
- Postcode district: MK43
- Dialling code: 01908
- Police: Bedfordshire
- Fire: Bedfordshire
- Ambulance: East of England
- UK Parliament: Mid Bedfordshire

Husborne Crawley is a small village and civil parish in Bedfordshire, England, located close to Junction 13 of the M1 motorway. The village touches the borders of the Woburn Abbey estate on one side, and the village of Aspley Guise on the other. The meaning of the Husborne element of the towns name is "warrior stream" and the Crawley element means "crow clearing". It appears as Hussheburn Crawele, in 1421.

== Village ==
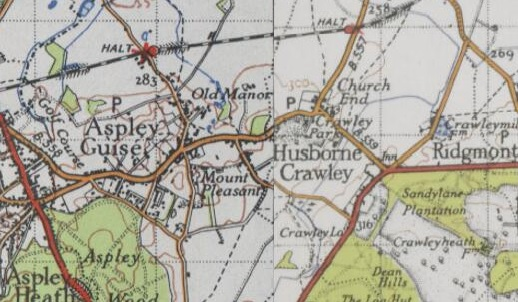
1945 Map of Husborne Crawley showing the towns topography

In the 1870s Crawley-Husborne was described as "a parish in Woburn district, Beds; on the Bedford and Bletchley railway, ¾ mile SW of Ridgmount r. station, and 1¾ NNE of Woburn."

St. James' Church which is located on School Lane, is the parish church of St. Mary, with work on the church being dated as early as the 13th century. The church has a tower with three bays, western tower with six chiming bells and clock face, and has been subject to various changes throughout its history, with one of the most substantial changes occurring at around the 15th century.

It has a nineteenth-century manor house in its own grounds, known as Crawley Park. The Crawley Park estate is privately owned, and features some preserved and listed wooden-framed medieval cottages. The village also has The White Horse public house, which is described as "A substantial corner pub on the main road through the village, it consists of a single U-shape room wrapped around a central bar counter along with some outside picnic benches".

Other amenities in the village include Husborne Crawley Lower School which was built by The Duke of Bedford in 1867, and was set up to ensure that the poorer families who worked on the estates, could have educated children. Husborne Crawley also has a village hall, called "The Reading Room", which is used by the community for meetings, social gatherings and parties.

== History ==
The parish is first mentioned in a document of 969 setting out the boundaries of Aspley Guise, by its original name of Hysseburnan. Within the Domesday Book which was commissioned by William the Conqueror (1066–1087), found that the parish of Husborne Crawley was divided into two manors. The parish was still considered two areas in the Middle Ages, one called Crawley and the other Husborne Crawley, the first was considered to be in the south part of the parish and the other to be the northern part. The parish of covers an area of 1,610½ acres, with a large portion (863 acres) of it being open grassland and also a large amount of arable land (414 acres).

== Population ==
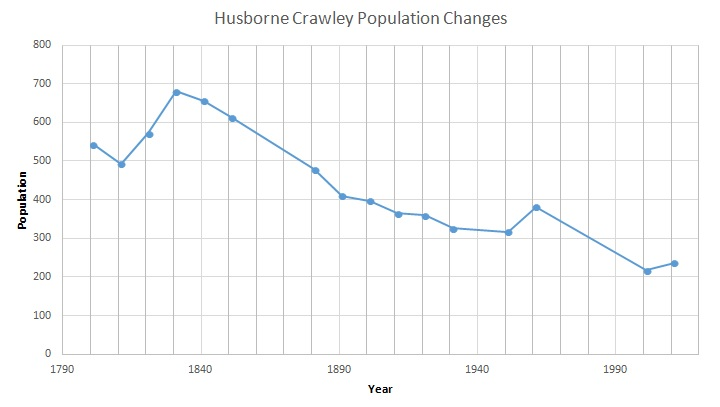
A graph showing the total Husborne Crawley Population from 1801 to 2011, as reported by the Vision of Britain website and Census information.

Husborne Crawley has a population of 237 according to the 2011 census. Increasing from a population of 217 according to the 2001 census. From the graph, the total population has changed large amounts for a small parish, decreasing more recently possibly due to people moving closer to larger local areas such as Milton Keynes, Leighton-Linslade or Dunstable as they are the larger settlements in the area. There are some gaps in the information as none was available, however clearly there has been a general decrease until very recently where the population has increased again. The changes have not been large enough and are more gradual to be from an event that might alter populations rapidly.

== Economy ==
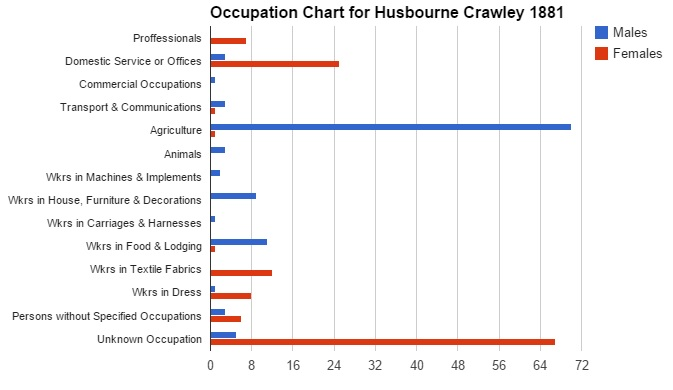
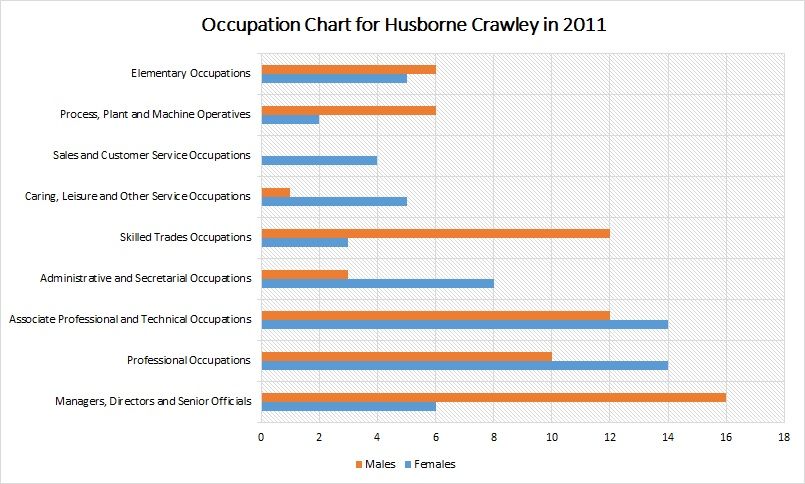

The population and their occupations have changed vastly over time, as land use has changed and as the demographic of the population has changed also. From the occupations shown in the graph of 1881, they were mostly employed in agriculture and manufacturing, with very few of the occupants having jobs with professional titles, or working in offices or commercial companies. The population as of 2011 had occupations that are more professional, office workers, and managers. The occupations that require manual labour still exist but are often more skilled trades or machine operators. Throughout the history of the parish its main industry has been agriculture, yields crops of wheat, barley and beans come from the areas very rich soil base.

== Transport ==
The M1 Motorway is Husborne Crawley's main transport infrastructure, and is about one mile north-east on the Bedford Road heading eastbound from a roundabout due north of the village, accessible via the roundabout system at junction 13. Here, the Bedford Road also goes north to meet the A421 at a roundabout, which goes north-west to reach Milton Keynes, and north-east to reach Bedford, the centres of which are about 6 miles (9.7 km) away, and 11 miles (18 km) away respectively.

Husborne Crawley is served by Ridgmont railway station which is located away on the other side of the M1 Motorway at Junction 13. London Midland trains serve the station, which also acts as a transport route for workers at an Amazon.com warehouse which is located on the other side of the M1.

There are 7 local bus services that run from Husborne Crawley, the largest operator is Centrebus which operates three of the seven main services.

== Geology ==
The geology of Husborne Crawley is made up of greensand sandstone, although there are areas of mudstone layered within the sandstone which is part of the Oxford Clay Formation. The soil is therefore mostly sandy and partially clay, with some smaller areas of mixed soil including; sand, alluvium, gravel, clay and silt.
