= Tingrith =

Village in Bedfordshire, England

Coordinates: 51.98°N 0.533889°W

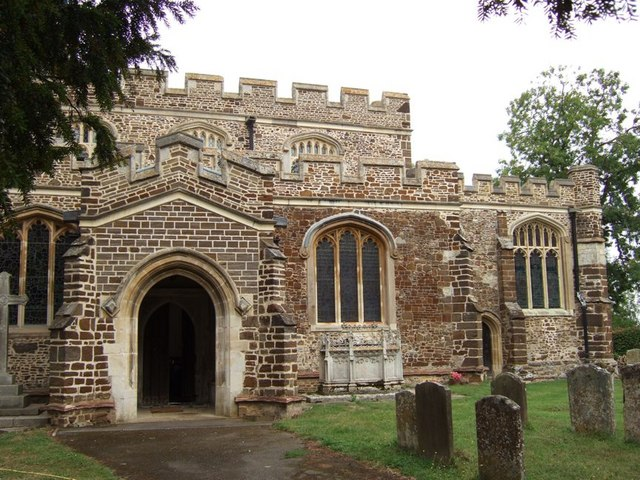
- Church of St Nicholas

- Location within Bedfordshire
- Population: 161 (parish)
- OS grid reference: TL006813
- Civil parish: Tingrith
- Unitary authority: Central Bedfordshire
- Ceremonial county: Bedfordshire
- Region: East
- Country: England
- Sovereign state: United Kingdom
- Post town: MILTON KEYNES
- Postcode district: MK17
- Dialling code: 01525
- Police: Bedfordshire
- Fire: Bedfordshire
- Ambulance: East of England
- UK Parliament: Mid Bedfordshire

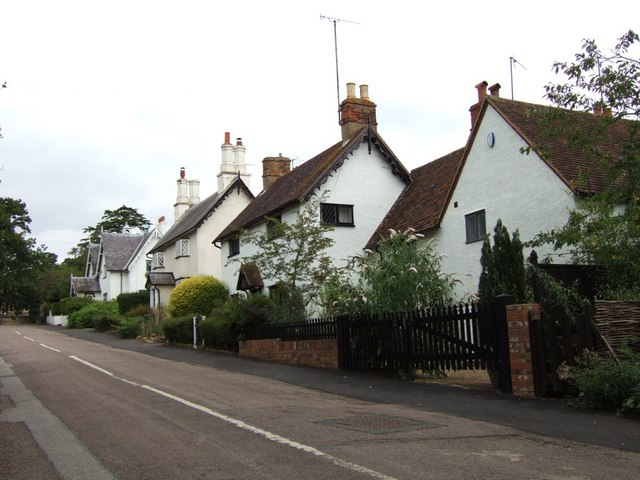
Church Road, Tingrith

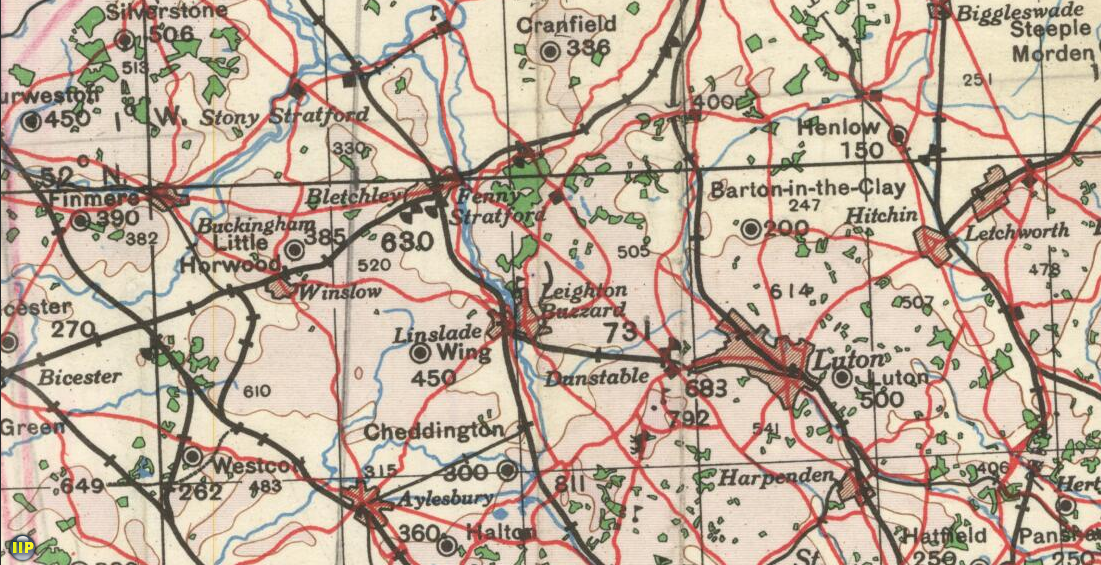
A British War Office map from 1940 displaying the area around Tingrith Civil Parish, Central Bedfordshire

Tingrith is a small village and civil parish in Bedfordshire, England. It is located adjacent to the M1 motorway near the large village of Toddington. The nearest major town is Luton, located about 10 miles (16 km) to the southeast. The parish church of St Nicholas dates back to the 13th century and has Tingrith's only cemetery. The church can seat up to 200 people.

Tingrith had a population of 153 people – a ratio of 78:75 males to females, according to the 2011 census.

Tingrith is mentioned in the Domesday Book; the entry states Tingrei: Thorgils from Nigel d'Aubigny

== History ==
In the 1870s, Tingrith was described as:

A parish in Woburn district, Beds; 4 miles E of Woburn, and 4½ SE of Ridgmount r. station. Real property, £1,450. Pop., 226. Houses, 38. The living is a rectory in the diocese of Ely. Value, £240.* Patrons, Misses Trevor. The church is chiefly later English.

In the past, the most common occupation for males over the age of 20 in Tingrith was agricultural labour; in 1831 70% of males over the age of 20 were working in agriculture. Other popular occupations during this time were: farmers employing labourers, retail, professionals and servants. In 1881 agricultural work was still very popular in the Tingrith area, with 64% of males working in agriculture. Although information for male occupations was well recorded, 50% of female occupations were unknown in 1881. Of the female occupations that were recorded in 1881, the most common were for women to work in the domestic services or offices or working with dress. As 84% of the occupations were labourers or servants in 1831, it can interpreted that Tingrith at this time was a lower class area. Along with this, in 1831 only 11% of the population were employers or professionals.

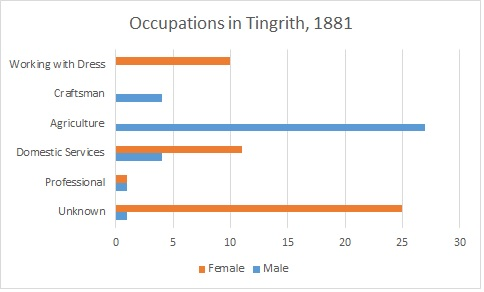
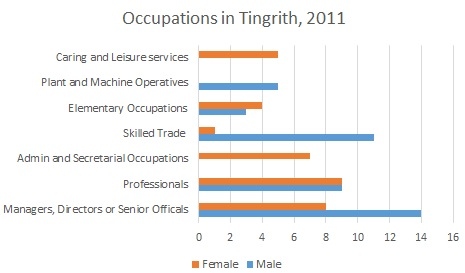

As seen from the graphs above, in Tingrith in 2011, the most common occupations for males were leading roles, such as managers, directors or senior officials. This was closely followed by jobs in skilled trade. This was very different to the most common occupation in 1881, which was agriculture; very little of which is now seen in Tingrith. The most common occupation among females was a working professional; this was closely followed by jobs in leading roles, such as managers, directors and senior officials. Compared to 1881, it is clear that far more women were working in 2011, as far more of their occupations were recorded.

== Demography ==
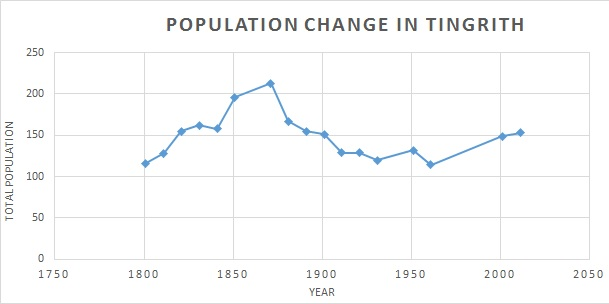
According to the 2011 census, 71.3% of the population of Tingrith were over the age of 30. The ethnic make up of the area was predominantly white; 89.5% of the population in this area were White (English, Welsh, Scottish or Northern Irish). The rest of the population were White Irish (3.3%), White Other (2.6%), Mixed Ethnic Group- White and Black Caribbean (1.3%), Mixed ethnic group- other (0.7%), Asian/Asian British- Indian (2%) and Black British- Caribbean (0.7%).

The area had a larger population around the 1870s of approximately 210 residents, the population then dipped to approximately 110 residents just less than 100 years later, around 1960. This then rose steadily to 153 residents in 2011, and 161 in 2021.

In 2011 the percentage of people over the age of 16, with 5 or more GCSE grades A-C was 20%; higher than the national average of 15.2%. Along with this, the percentage of unemployed in Tingrith was only 1.7%, which was lower than the national average of 4.4%

== Housing and transport ==
The number of houses in Tingrith has steadily grown from 1831. In 1831 there were 27 houses in Tingrith but this rose to 46 houses in 1951 and then dropped to 42 houses ten years later, in 1961. In 2011 there were 59 houses in Tingrith civil parish. According to the 2011 census, 49.2% of the Tingrith population owned their homes outright; this was almost 20 percentage points higher than the national average.

House prices in Tingrith range from approximately £120,000 up to £765,000.

The closest rail stations are Flitwick and Harlington, which are within a 2-mile radius of Tingrith. The closest airports are Cranfield (8 miles) and Luton (16 miles).

== Notable residents ==
Sandra Kynes, the Pagan author, lived in Tingrith during her time in the United Kingdom.

Charles Tanqueray, the founder and distiller of Tanqueray Gin in 1830 lived at Tanqueray House.
