= Eversholt =

Village in Bedfordshire, England

Coordinates: 51.98333°N 0.55°W

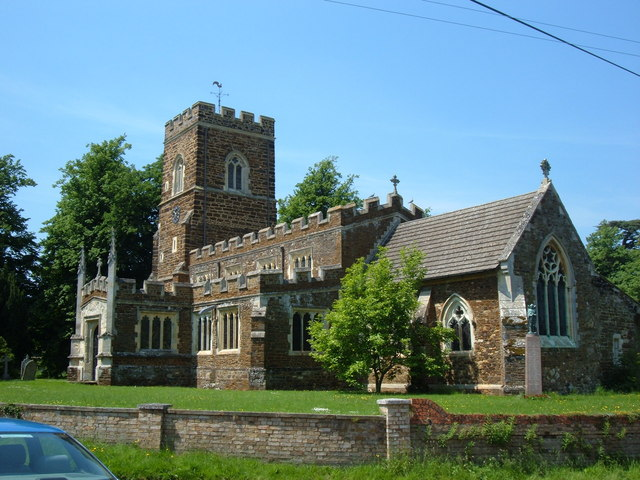
- Parish church of St John the Baptist

- Location within Bedfordshire
- Population: 442 (2011 Census)
- OS grid reference: SP996326
- Unitary authority: Central Bedfordshire
- Ceremonial county: Bedfordshire
- Region: East
- Country: England
- Sovereign state: United Kingdom
- Post town: MILTON KEYNES
- Postcode district: MK17
- Dialling code: 01525
- Police: Bedfordshire
- Fire: Bedfordshire
- Ambulance: East of England
- UK Parliament: Mid Bedfordshire

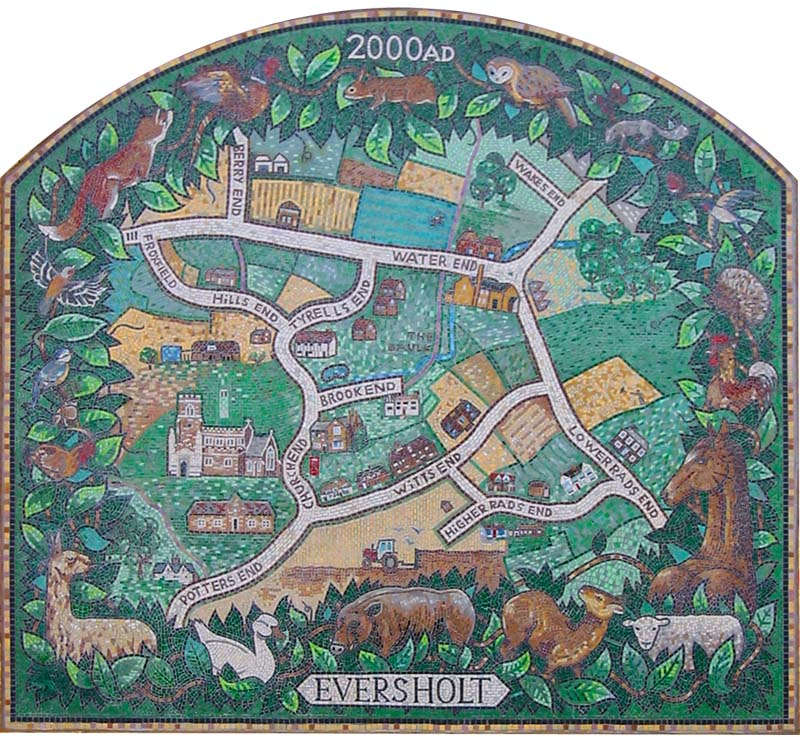
Glass mosaic Eversholt map in the wall of the village hall. Designed and made by artists Gary Drostle and Rob Turner in 2000.

Eversholt is a village and civil parish located in Bedfordshire, England. It was mentioned in the Domesday Book and is over 1000 years old. "Eversholt" comes from Anglo-Saxon meaning "wood of the wild boar".

== Overview ==
For many years, most of the land in the village was owned by the Dukes of Bedford, and most of the inhabitants worked on the Bedford estate. The estate still forms an important, although lesser, part of village life.

Most of the land is used for agriculture. There are about a dozen small businesses operating in converted farm buildings. The current population is about 420. The last shop in the village closed in 1994.

The Church of Saint John the Baptist was originally built at the centre of the village in the twelfth century, and is still used regularly. There is a modern village hall (a replacement for the old Reading Room which burned down in 1984), a tennis court, a pond built by the residents themselves, an open-air swimming pool, and a pub, the Green Man (owned by Candice Brown, 2016 champion of The Great British Bake Off). Eversholt Cricket Club plays matches every week in summer. Eversholt Lower School educates children from five to nine years old, and has around 80 pupils from the village and surrounding areas. At age nine (the end of Year 4) children transfer to Parkfields Middle School in nearby Toddington.

There is a school for children from four to nine years old, with about 70 pupils from the village and surrounding area.

The cricket ground was, for many years, one of the only grounds in the world to have trees in the playing field - there were two. Local rules dictated that a ball hitting any part of a tree was dead and two runs were awarded. A copper beech at the Pavilion end of the ground was declared diseased and taken down in 1987 and a beech tree at the Village Hall end fell in October 2002, just a few weeks before it was due to be cut down. It fell whilst small children were playing at a Sunday football club, but none were harmed. The tree was then made into wood chips for the local school playground, various wooden objects such as bowls which were auctioned for charity, and a bench was made for the pond area.

The Millennium Pond, built in 2000 was transformed from an old field. It is now an area of woodland and plants containing a large pond connected to a stream. The residents built this themselves, and many organisations donated plants or trees, including the school.

The Eversholt Village Charity has been operating for at least 200 years. It owns properties in the village, and distributes income annually to students, to pensioners, and to the church.

== Transport ==
Ridgmont railway station is the nearest train station to the village and can be reached via frequent bus services.

== Notable residents ==
- E. W. Royce (1841–1926), actor and dancer at the Gaiety Theatre was born here.
