= Battlesden =

Hamlet in Bedfordshire, England

Coordinates: 51.94808°N 0.59556°W

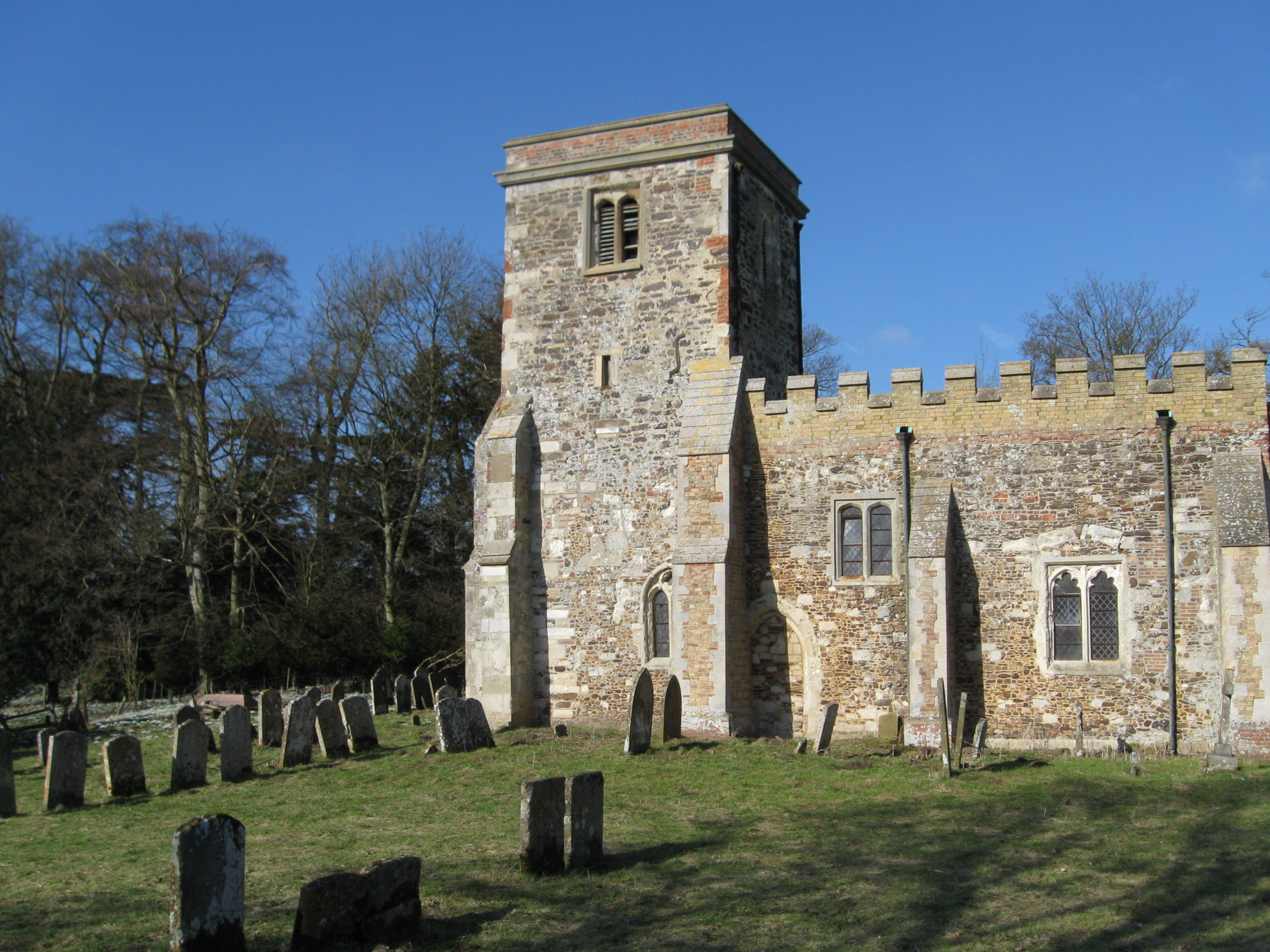

- Location within Bedfordshire
- OS grid reference: SP966286
- Unitary authority: Central Bedfordshire
- Ceremonial county: Bedfordshire
- Region: East
- Country: England
- Sovereign state: United Kingdom
- Post town: MILTON KEYNES
- Postcode district: MK17
- Police: Bedfordshire
- Fire: Bedfordshire
- Ambulance: East of England
- UK Parliament: Mid Bedfordshire

Battlesden is a hamlet and civil parish in the Central Bedfordshire district of Bedfordshire, England. It is just north of the A5, between Dunstable and Milton Keynes. According to the 2001 census, it had a population of 38. Because of its low electorate, it has a parish meeting rather than a parish council. It is in the civil parish of Milton Bryan.

Battlesden House was a large manor house situated in parkland, Battlesden Park, close to the hamlet.

Former residents of the village include Henry Skynner & John Dunnyng, both husbandman, defending a case of trespass in Badelesden, in 1422. John Smyth, the complainant, had land in Badelesden, and stated that 100 shillings worth of damage was done to his land.

== Battlesden Church ==
The Church of St. Peter and All Saints sits on a hillside, with its oldest sections dating back to the late 13th century. The nave, the main body of the church, measures 41 by 21 feet. There is a surviving two-light window from the late 13th century on the south wall near the west end, and a lancet window opposite it on the north wall. The chancel is probably of early 14th-century date, though nothing but the chancel arch now remains to show detail of that time; A tower was added in the 15th century to the southwest corner of the nave. Due to its age and the ground it's built on, it has noticeably tilted southwest and is now supported by many buttresses. The chancel likely dates from the early 14th century. The east window is modern, and the two south windows have been significantly restored. The north doorway of the nave is a simple 14th-century design, protected by a small, later porch. The font is a rough circular bowl and leaf carvings, believed to be from the late 12th century. The church also contains several wall monuments to the Duncombe family.
