= Potsgrove =

Village in Bedfordshire, England

Coordinates: 51.95°N 0.616667°W

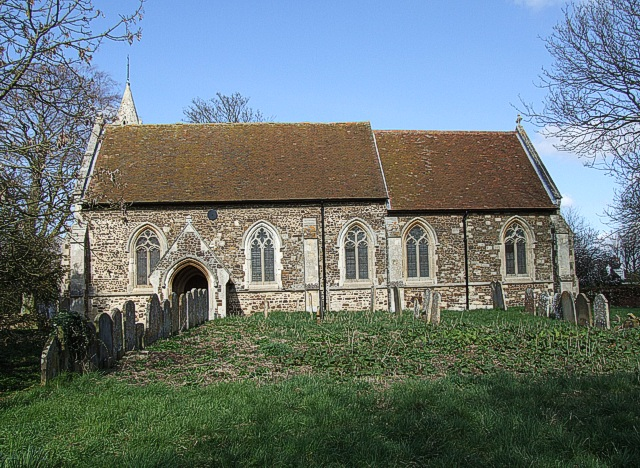
- Parish church of St Mary

- Location within Bedfordshire
- Population: 44 (2001)
- Civil parish: Potsgrove
- Unitary authority: Central Bedfordshire
- Ceremonial county: Bedfordshire
- Region: East
- Country: England
- Sovereign state: United Kingdom
- Post town: MILTON KEYNES
- Postcode district: MK17
- Police: Bedfordshire
- Fire: Bedfordshire
- Ambulance: East of England
- UK Parliament: Mid Bedfordshire

Potsgrove is a small village and civil parish located in the Central Bedfordshire district of Bedfordshire, England. The parish includes the hamlet of Sheep Lane.

The first reference to the village appears in the Domesday Book of 1086. The village is first recorded as "Potesgraue". Later references record the village as "Pottesgrove", which is still used in the name of the local ecclesiastical parish.

Manor Farm in Potsgrove for many years was run by the G Hunter and son. The farm organisation had a successful syndicate shoot for many years also included a dairy milk herd along with beef stock.

Woburn Abbey owned land in Potsgrove.

The village held an annual clay shoot which included team guns vs. beaters, plus an open free-to-all shoot off at the end of the day

Prominent local families included the McClurg's who lived at the old school house and worked at manor farm for many years (1970–2013), the Hodges, Bentley's and Grahams.

Potsgrove had its own school until the early 1900s, along with a pub called the Sow and Pigs.
