= Jemima Grey, Duchess of Kent =

English noblewoman (1675–1728)

Her Grace The Duchess of Kent
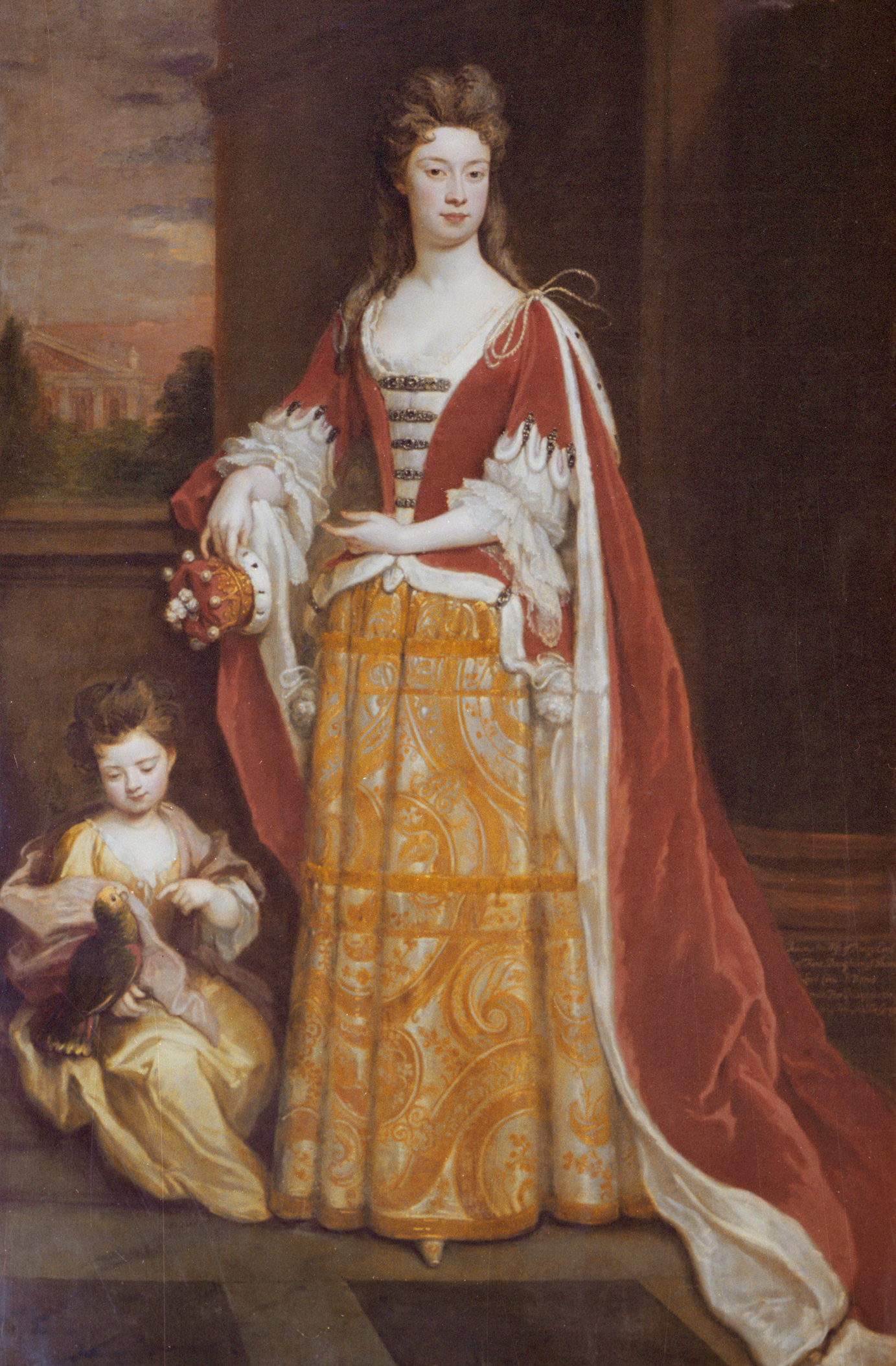
- Jemima Crew, first wife of Henry Grey, with their daughter Jemima Grey
- Born: Jemima Crew; 1675
- Died: 2 July 1728 (aged 52–53)
- Buried: De Grey Mausoleum
- Noble family: Grey (by marriage)
- Spouse: Henry Grey, 1st Duke of Kent (m. 1694)
- Issue: Anthony Grey, Earl of Harold; Lord Henry Grey; Amabel Campbell, Countess of Breadalbane and Holland; Jemima Ashburnham, Countess of Ashburnham; Anne, Lady Charles Cavendish; Lady Mary Gregory
- Father: Thomas Crew, 2nd Baron Crew
- Mother: Anne Armine

Jemima Grey, Duchess of Kent (née Crew; 1675 – 2 July 1728), was the first wife of Henry Grey, 1st Duke of Kent.

Jemima was a daughter of Thomas Crew, 2nd Baron Crew, and his second wife, the former Anne Armine, herself the daughter of Sir William Armine, 2nd Baronet. A portrait of Jemima with her two sisters, Armine and Elizabeth, as children, was taken by Jemima to her new home at Wrest Park when she married; it was restored and returned to the house by English Heritage in 2017.

She married the future duke in 1694, and they had at least six children:

- Anthony Grey, Earl of Harold (d. 1723); married Lady Mary Tufton, daughter of Thomas Tufton, 6th Earl of Thanet, and Lady Catharine Cavendish, and had no children.
- Lord Henry Grey (c. 1696 – 1717)
- Lady Amabel Grey (1698–1726); married John Campbell, 3rd Earl of Breadalbane and Holland, and had children.
- Lady Jemima Grey (c. 1699 – 1731); married John Ashburnham, 1st Earl of Ashburnham, as his third wife, and had one son.
- Lady Anne Grey (d. 20 September 1733), who married Lord Charles Cavendish, and had children, including the scientist Henry Cavendish.
- Lady Mary Grey (1719–1761), who married David Gregory, Dean of Christ Church, and had children.

As a result of her husband's acquisition of titles, Jemima became Countess of Kent and Baroness Lucas of Crudwell in 1702, Marchioness of Kent, Countess of Harold and Viscountess Goderich in 1706, and Duchess of Kent in 1710. The gardens at Wrest Park, originally laid out by the duke, were later extended and remodelled by the couple's granddaughter, Jemima Yorke, 2nd Marchioness Grey.

The duchess was buried in the Grey family mausoleum at St John the Baptist Church, Flitton. Following her death, the duke married Sophia Bentinck and had further children.
