= River Flit =

River in Bedfordshire, England

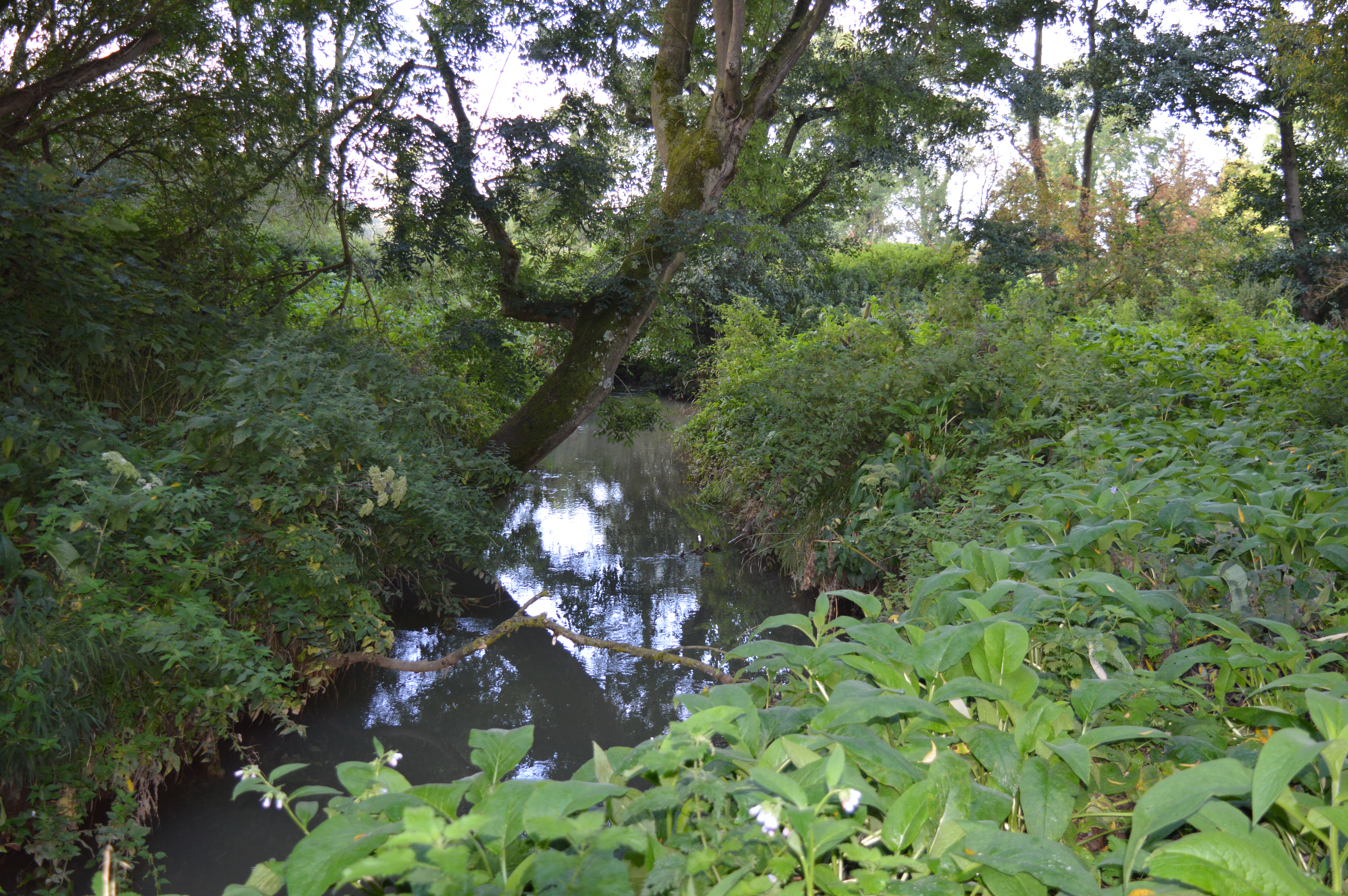
- River Flit in Flitwick Moor

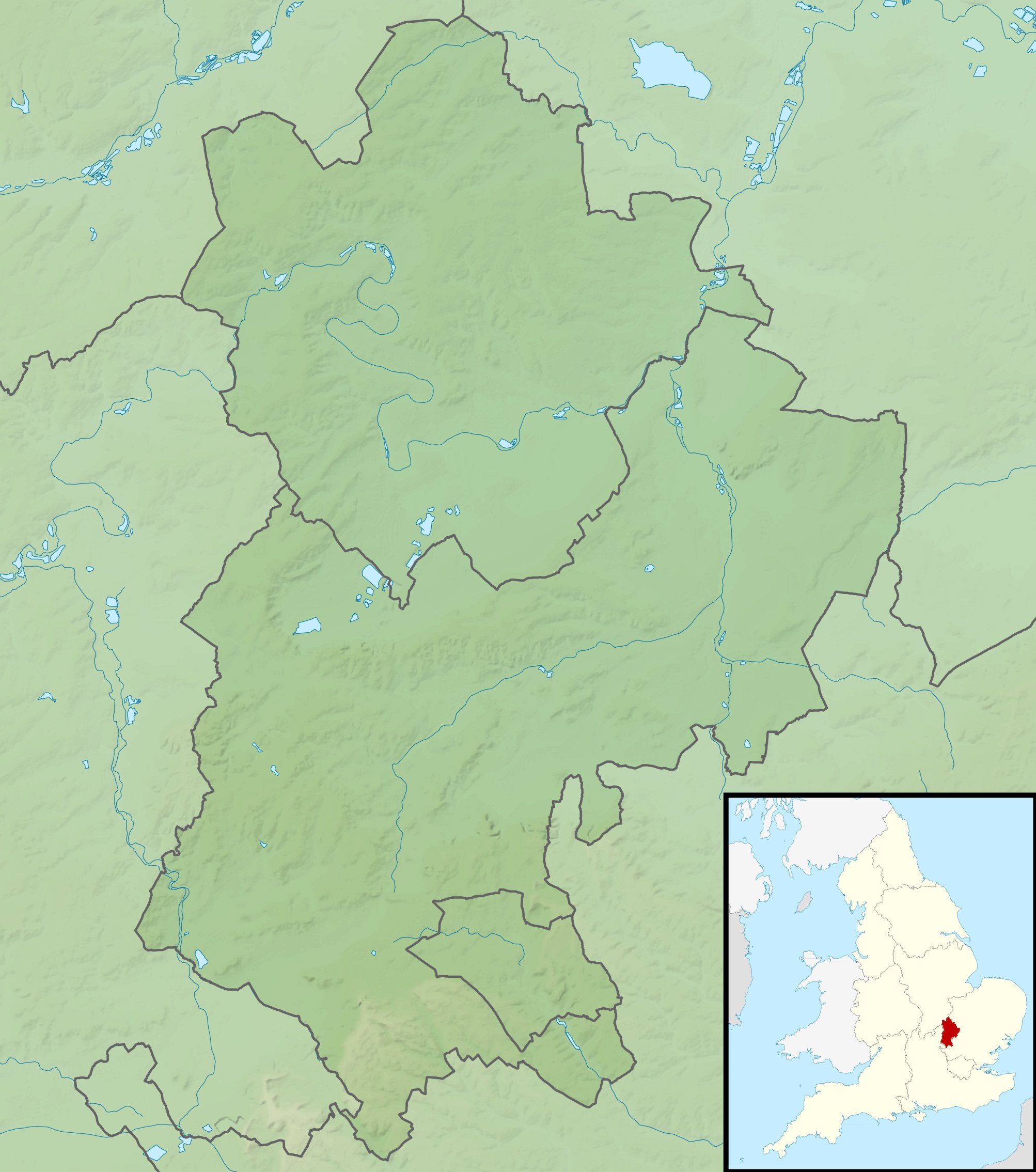
- Location within Bedfordshire Location within the United Kingdom

Location
- Country: England
- County: Bedfordshire

Physical characteristics
- Source
  - location: East of Chalton
  - coordinates: 51°55′35.64″N 0°29′38.9″W
- Mouth: River Ivel
  - location: Langford
  - coordinates: 52.03855°N 0.34727°W

Basin features
- Tributaries
  - right: River Hit

The River Flit is a short river in Bedfordshire, England. Its name is not ancient, but rather a back formation from Flitton which originally meant that the river was spelt as Flitt rather than Flit.

== Course ==
The river rises as a small pool beneath Carters Hill, a few metres to the east of the M1 motorway and just to the east of the village of Chalton, Bedfordshire.

Flowing north, it reaches Flitwick, then north east past Greenfield and Flitton, then through Clophill, Chicksands, and Shefford, where it is joined by the River Hit, then past Stanford, before meeting the River Ivel at Langford.

Below its junction with the River Hit, the 5 kilometres (3.1 mi) of its course was largely incorporated into a canal, known as the Shefford Canal or River Ivel Navigation. Completed in 1823, the canal connected Shefford with the North Sea allowing barges of coal to be brought to the town. The canal fell into decline over the following decades and in 1876 a dam was installed on the Ivel at Sandy, closing the Shefford section for good. Today, sections of the canal near Shefford are dry or have been filled in.

== Water quality ==
The Environment Agency measures the water quality of the river systems in England. Each is given an overall ecological status, which may be one of five levels: high, good, moderate, poor and bad. There are several components that are used to determine this, including biological status, which looks at the quantity and varieties of invertebrates, angiosperms and fish. Chemical status, which compares the concentrations of various chemicals against known safe concentrations, is rated good or fail.

The water quality of the River Flit system was as follows in 2022.

River Flit water quality
Water body	Water body type	Ecological status	Length	Hydromorphological designation	Catchment size
Flit Water Body	River	Moderate	8.227 km (5.112 mi)	Heavily Modified	23.647 km^{2} (9.130 sq mi)
Flit and Ivel Navigation d/s of Shefford Water Body	River	Moderate	22.601 km (14.044 mi)	Heavily Modified	41.315 km^{2} (15.952 sq mi)
Flit tributary Water Body	River	Good	1.167 km (0.725 mi)	Not designated ‘artificial’ or ‘heavily modified’	21.126 km^{2} (8.157 sq mi)

The reasons for the quality being less than good include sewage discharge and physical modification of the channel.

The River Flit is part of the Ivel Operational Catchment, which has 20 bodies.
