= Embassy of Saudi Arabia, London =

Embassy of Saudi Arabia in London
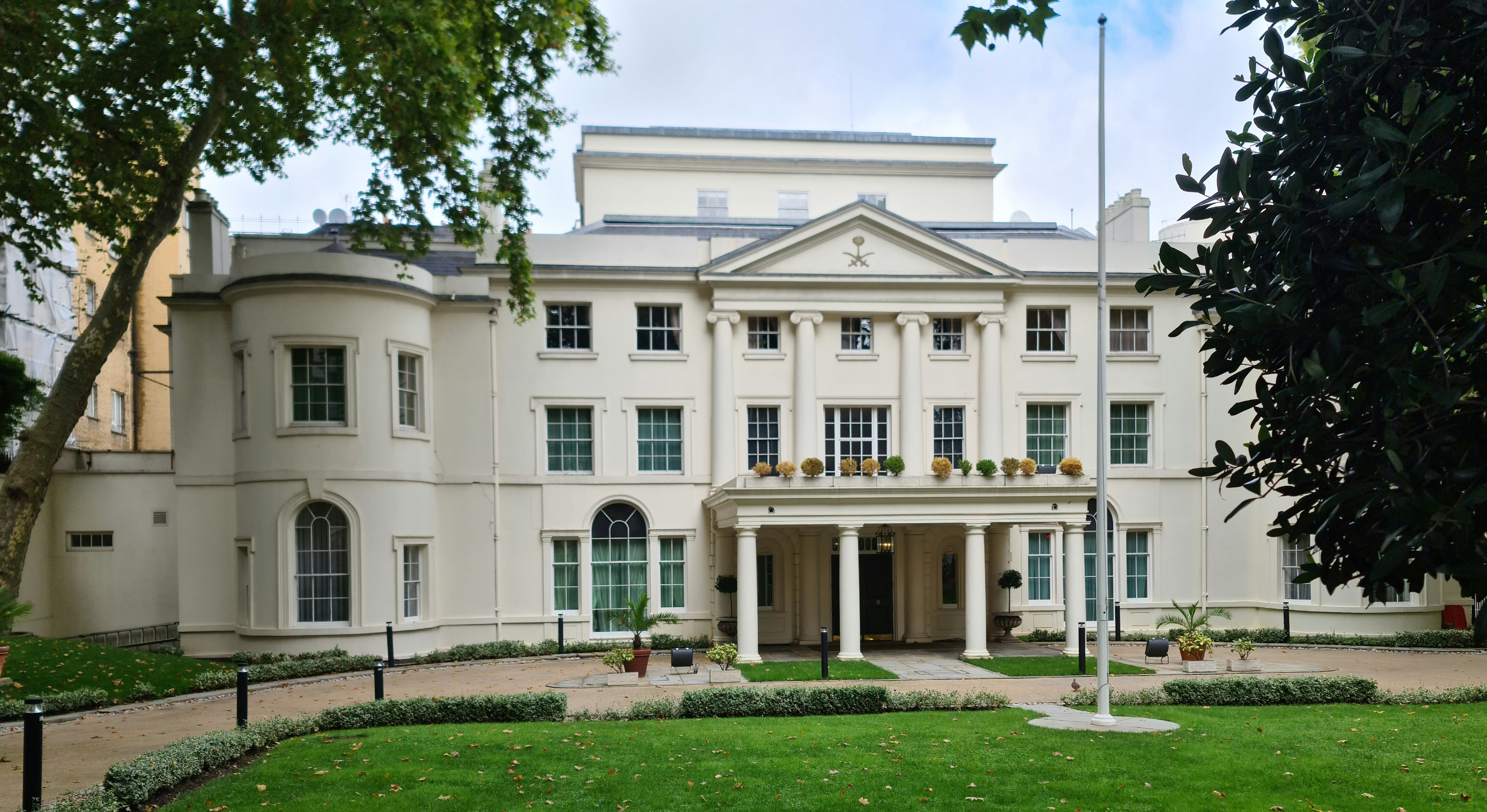
- Location: Mayfair, London
- Address: Charles Street, London, W1
- Coordinates: 51°30′25.8″N 0°8′52.1″W
- Ambassador: Khalid bin Bandar Al Saud

The Embassy of Saudi Arabia in London (officially the Royal Embassy of Saudi Arabia; Arabic: السفارة السعودية الملكية في لندن) is the diplomatic mission of Saudi Arabia in the United Kingdom. Saudi Arabia also maintains a Defence Attaché's Office at 26 Queen's Gate, South Kensington, a Diplomatic Office of the Cultural Bureau at 630 Chiswick High Road, Gunnersbury, a Medical Section at 60 Queen Anne Street, Marylebone, a Commercial Section at 15/16 Queen Street, Mayfair, an Islamic Affairs Section at 2nd Floor, Park Lorne, 111 Park Road, Lisson Grove, and an Information Section at 18 Seymour Street, Marylebone.

The embassy is situated in Crewe House, a detached mansion designed and constructed by Edward Shepherd in 1730, set in its own grounds in Mayfair. Built in the Georgian style, it is a Grade II* listed building. The house was considerably altered in the late 18th and early 19th centuries. Much of its neoclassical interior dates from the early 19th century, and some of Shepherd's original plasterwork ceilings may survive.

== See also ==
- Saudi Arabia–United Kingdom relations
