= Silsoe =

Village in Bedfordshire, England

Coordinates: 52.00852°N 0.42378°W

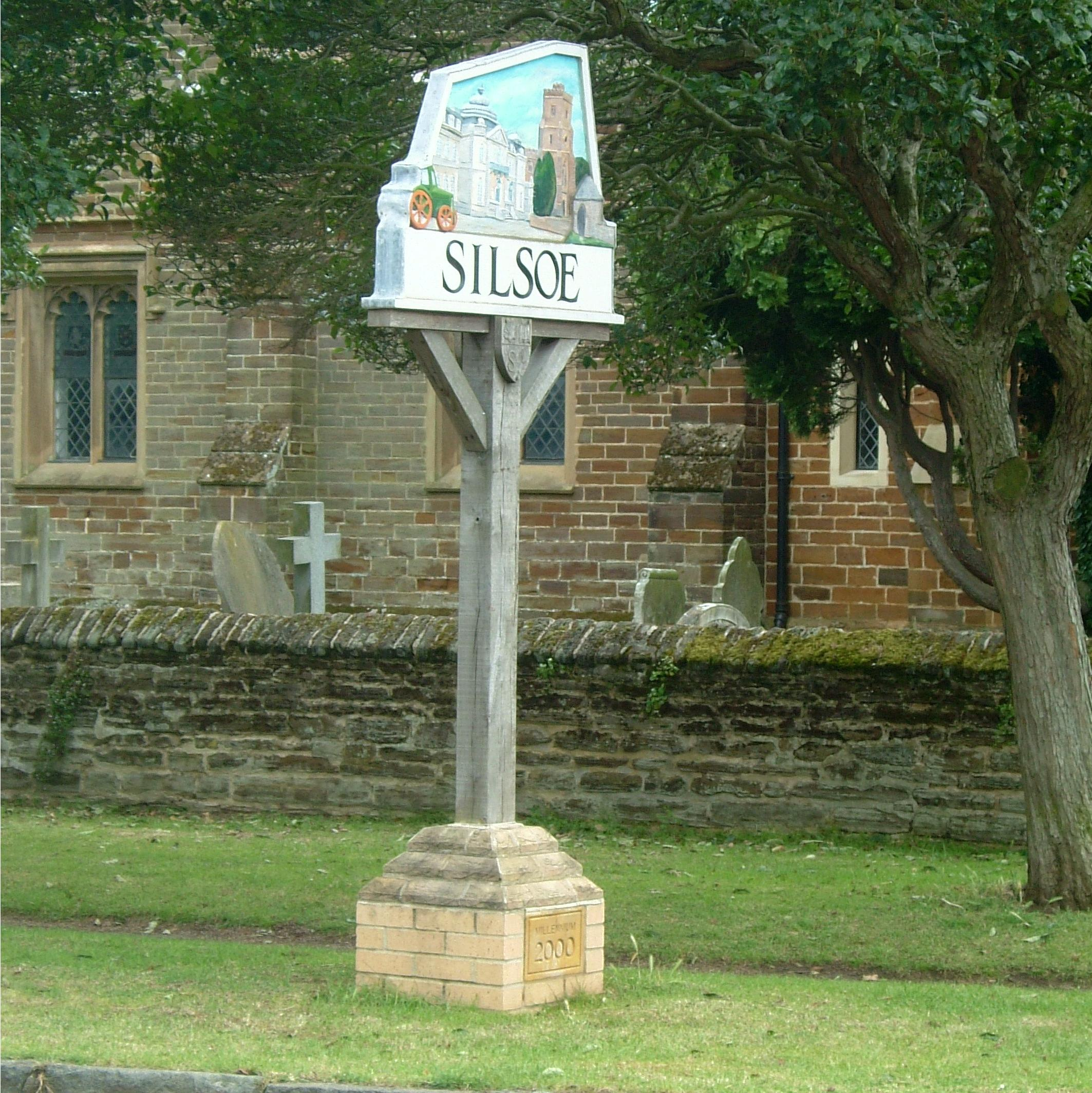
- Silsoe village sign 2000 Millennium Year

- Location within Bedfordshire
- Population: 1,729 (2001 census); 1,791 (2011 Census)
- OS grid reference: TL082354
  - London: 39 miles (63 km)
- Civil parish: Silsoe
- Unitary authority: Central Bedfordshire
- Ceremonial county: Bedfordshire
- Region: East
- Country: England
- Sovereign state: United Kingdom
- Post town: BEDFORD
- Postcode district: MK45
- Dialling code: 01525
- Police: Bedfordshire
- Fire: Bedfordshire
- Ambulance: East of England
- UK Parliament: Mid Bedfordshire

Silsoe is a village and civil parish in Bedfordshire, England. The village used to be on the main A6 road but a bypass around the village was opened in 1981 at a cost of £1.6m.

== History ==
=== Origin ===
The village name is derived from the Danish word 'hoh', in "Sifels hoh", meaning "Sifel's hill". The Danes were thought to have been the earliest settlers here. The Domesday Book (1086 – Siuuilessou or Sewilessou) records two manors, the larger held by Hugh of Walter, brother of Saher, and this later became the manor of Wrest. A smaller manor, believed to be that of Newbury, was owned by a concubine of Nigel d'Aubigny. The first market was held here weekly on Tuesdays and annual fair on 1 May from 1318.

A Latinized form of the village name may be seen as "Sevelesho", in a legal record of 1430, where the defendants William Butte, yeoman & William Clerk, husbandman lived.

By 1563 there were 21 families living in Silsoe. The village growth was largely influenced by the needs of the Wrest Park estate and most of the inhabitants were servants, gardeners, stable hands and blacksmiths who lived in thatched and terrace cottages some of which still exist today. There was also a baker, who supplied Wrest House, and in the roof of the old bakehouse off the High Street, the oven ventilation can still be seen. From 1715 an annual fair was held on 10 September and a weekly market on Wednesdays. By the mid-19th century a number of trades were present in the village. There was a butcher, a milkman, cobbler, draper, builder and a grocer.

=== The Wrest Estate ===
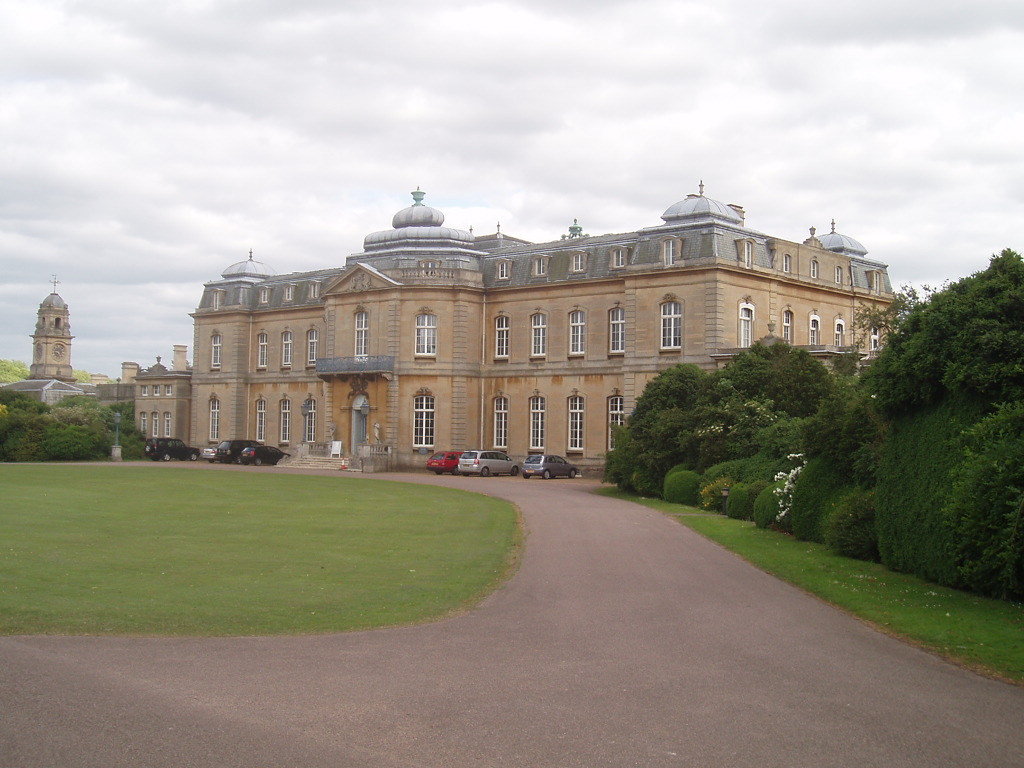
Wrest Park House, formerly home to research laboratories, now looked after by English Heritage

The Wrest Estate, in turn, provided the village with a church – St James's, a school and a row of almshouses, so sited that a row of cottages was hidden from the gentry's view as they drove from the Park to the church in nearby Flitton. Silsoe's position on a main road to London and halfway between Bedford and Luton made it a favourite halt for drovers and travellers stopping at the George coaching inn (first mentioned in 1624) on the High Street.

Silsoe had many inns including The White Hart, The Ragged Staff, Duke of Kent's Arms, The Bell, The Battle of Alma (or known as The Mouse's Hole in West End Road), Lord Nelson (Newbury Lane) and The George (High Street). The latter was converted into apartments in 2018. Now only the Star and Garter in the High Street remains. During the First World War Wrest House was used as a military hospital until 1916 when the house was damaged by fire. Lady Lucas, the last member of the de Grey dynasty, sold the House and estate before an auction that was to have been held at the Mart, Tokenhouse Yard, London EC2 on 17 July 1917.

Wrest Park's house and gardens are now part of English Heritage and have been restored and opened to the public from 4 August 2011.

=== Silsoe College ===
The village was, until 2007, the location of the Silsoe Research Institute, a BBSRC-funded body, in Wrest Park. The village also was home to Cranfield University's Silsoe campus for agricultural engineering. The former campus grounds are being redeveloped for housing, community and business use. The college was founded as the National College of Agricultural Engineering.

Since 2007 three property developers, Miller Homes, Bloor Homes and Bellway, have produced several hundred family homes. Stringent adherence to reflect the character of the village was followed, thus attracting new families and residents seeking village life. This area is often referred to as the "New Estate".

=== Church of St James and War Memorial ===
The church stands on the site of a much earlier free chapel of St. Leonard, first mentioned in the Liber Antiquus (1209–35), that became a chapel of ease in the 17th century. The chapel belonged to the abbey of Elstow. Eventually the chapel had a central tower. In the fourteenth century two chantries were founded in the chapel. In the early 19th century Thomas Philip Robinson, 2nd Earl de Grey (1781–1859), wished to construct a spire but the weight of the structure proved too much for the supporting walls and the whole building collapsed. The church was rebuilt between 1829–1831 and opened on 20 February 1831. It consists of chancel, nave, aisles and a tower containing three bells. Nikolaus Pevsner admired it as 'an astonishing job for its day'. The architect was Smith of Hereford who achieved 'an antiquarian accuracy here extremely rare ten years before Pugin'. Other sources such as Arthur Mee suggest that the architect was Earl de Grey, confirmed by Charles Read. Built in local ironstone, all embattled. The altar rails are made from 17th century oak taken from the chapel of the original Wrest House. Most of its stained glass windows represent the families of Wrest House. On Sunday, 25 July 1909 King Edward VII attended the church service here and made a donation towards the clock fund.

The War Memorial outside the church is of stone. The church also has an inscribed board with a further list of men.

=== The Lock-up ===
In Church Road, is an ironstone lock-up erected 1796, octagonal, with a pointed head to the doorway. It was used as a temporary place for stray animals or drunks, and its central pole, now removed, was used to chain prisoners in transit between Bedford and Luton.

=== Modern history ===
The village was struck by an F1/T2 tornado on 23 November 1981, as part of the record-breaking nationwide tornado outbreak on that day.

The Millennium Green is a 4.94-hectare amenity space located off the High Street. Cranfield University landscape engineering students drew up designs in collaboration with residents of the village and won a grant of over £45,000 to form the Green, a tranquil centrepiece for the village. As an integral part of the village, Cranfield University had also been invited to contribute to Silsoe Parish Council's Millennium Time Capsule which was placed there in March 2000.

Ron Baynham (1929–2024), a former England international footballer, retired to the village.

== Governance ==
The village has a Parish Council which has details of the Chair and meeting dates on its website. Silsoe is currently part of Central Bedfordshire Council, headed by Councillor Naan for the ward of Wrest.

== Demography ==
The 2001 Census showed 1,729 residents in the parish, 869 male and 860 female living in 620 dwellings. Over 130 of these are listed. This will have included a number of residents of Silsoe College, closed in 2007, the site of which has been redeveloped for housing and community use.

== Education ==
Silsoe C of E VC Lower School is in Silsoe located on the main road of the new estate, beside the Silsoe Community Sports Centre. The school is religious and very lively. It was originally located in a small establishment close to Millenium Green but was then moved into a larger building in December 2016.

The East Half House and Whitehall (Wrest Park) communities are in the catchment zone for Robert Bloomfield Academy.

== See also ==
- Wrest Park
- de Grey Mausoleum
