= De Grey Mausoleum =

Historic site in Bedfordshire, England

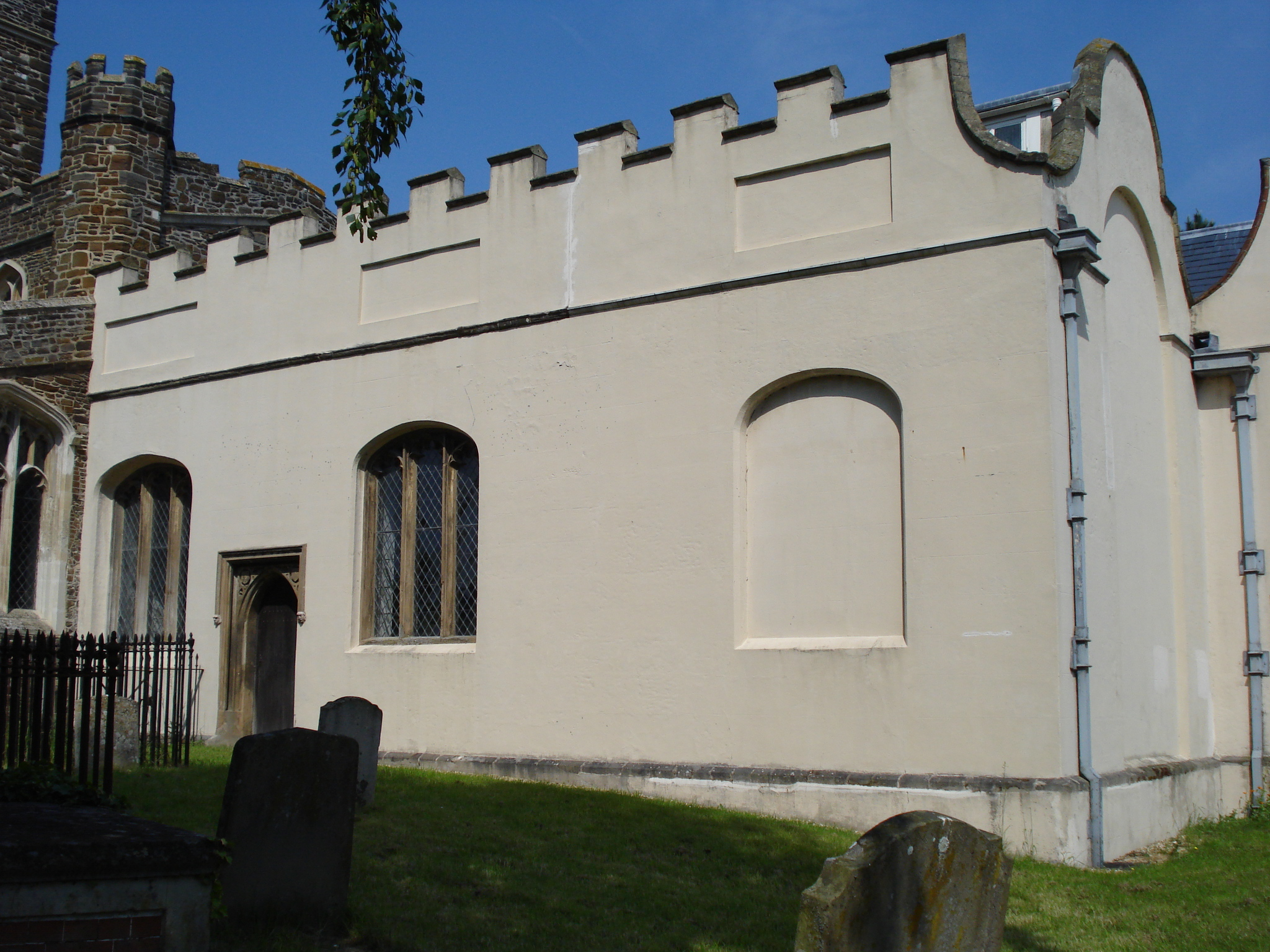
- De Grey Mausoleum, 2007
- Interactive map of De Grey Mausoleum
- Location: Flitton, Bedfordshire, England
- Coordinates: 52.01106°N 0.45769°W
- Designer: Edward Shepherd (1739–40)
- Type: Mausoleum
- Completion date: c. 1614
- Dedicated to: De Grey family

Listed Building – Grade I
- Designated: 23 January 1961
- Reference no.: 1113904

The de Grey Mausoleum in Flitton, Bedfordshire, England, is one of the largest sepulchral chapels in the country. The mausoleum contains over twenty monuments to the de Grey family who lived in nearby Wrest Park. The cruciform mausoleum has its nave set against the north side of the chancel of the adjacent church of St John the Baptist and its south transept overlaps the east end. The oldest part of Mausoleum was built circa 1614, the eastern parts were added in 1705. The architect Edward Shepherd worked on the building during 1739–40.

It is a Grade I listed building, a scheduled monument, and is in the guardianship of English Heritage who open it to the public.

== The monuments ==
- Henry Grey, 6th Earl of Kent and his countess Mary Cotton (1614)
- Henry Grey, 10th Earl of Kent (1651) and his countess Arabella (1698)
- Lady Elizabeth Talbot (1651)
- Lady Jane Hart (1673)
- Charles Grey (1623) and his son Henry Grey (1639), slabs
- Lady Henrietta de Grey (1703)
- Henry de Grey (1717)
- Lady Amabel de Grey (1727)
- Lady Anne de Grey (1770)
- Anthony Grey, Earl of Harold (1723), by Dowyer
- Thomas Philip, 2nd Earl de Grey (1859), by Matthew Noble
- Henrietta Frances, Countess de Grey (1848), by Terence Farrell
- Henry Grey, 1st Duke of Kent and Marquess de Grey (1740), by Edward Shepard, effigy of the duke attributed to J. Michael Rysbrack
- Jemima Grey, Duchess of Kent, the duke's first wife (1728)
- Sophia de Grey (1748)
- Ann Sophia de Grey (1780)
- Philip Yorke, 2nd Earl of Hardwicke (1790), by Thomas Banks
- Jemima Yorke, 2nd Marchioness Grey (1797)
- Amabel Hume-Campbell, 1st Countess de Grey (1833)
- Mary Jemima Yorke, Baroness Grantham (1830)
- Harry Grey, son of George, Earl of Kent (1545), a brass removed from the church

== See also ==
- Wrest Park
- Flitton
