= Greenfield, Bedfordshire =

Village in Bedfordshire, England

Coordinates: 52.00274°N 0.46576°W

Greenfield
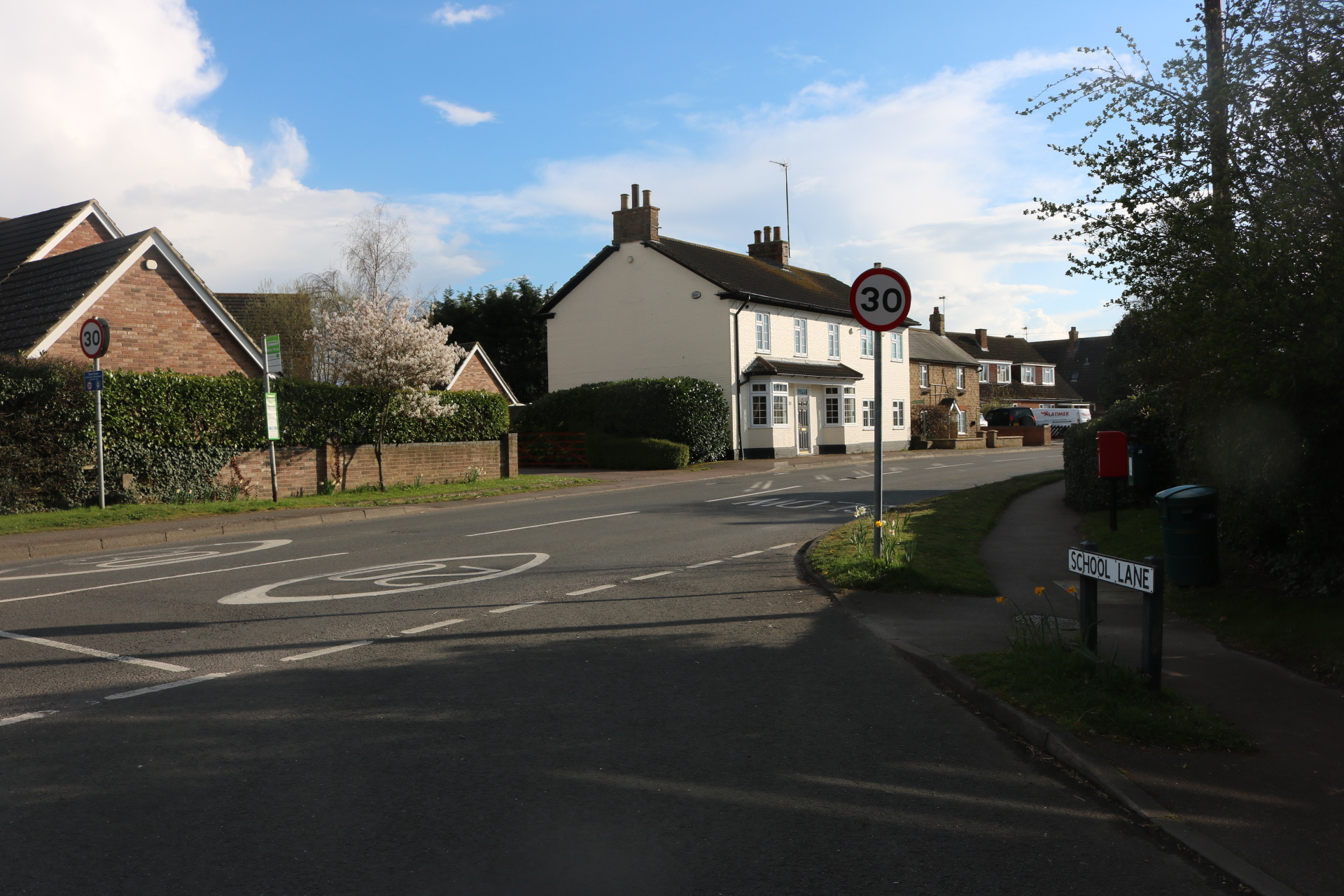
- School Lane Junction

- Location within Bedfordshire
- OS grid reference: TL053063
- Unitary authority: Central Bedfordshire
- Ceremonial county: Bedfordshire
- Region: East
- Country: England
- Sovereign state: United Kingdom
- Post town: BEDFORD
- Postcode district: MK45
- Dialling code: 01525
- Police: Bedfordshire
- Fire: Bedfordshire
- Ambulance: East of England
- UK Parliament: Mid Bedfordshire

Greenfield is a small village about 2 km (1.2 mi) from the town of Flitwick in Bedfordshire, England. It lies across Flitwick Moor from the larger settlement of Flitwick and is on the opposite side of the River Flit. It forms part of the parish of Flitton and Greenfield.

The main street (High Street) has junctions with Pulloxhill road, leading to the village of Pulloxhill, School Lane, the site of the old village school. High Street also has a junction with Mill Lane, which was until the 1960s a cart route to Ruxox Farm, Maulden and Ampthill and now leads to footpaths and bridleways to Maggot Moor, Flitwick Moor, Ruxox Farm, Flitton Moor, and the village of Flitton. Houses along High Street are a mix of thatched cottages and Bedfordshire brick dwellings, with an assortment of renovated or rebuilt barn buildings in keeping to some extent with earlier farm courtyard structures.

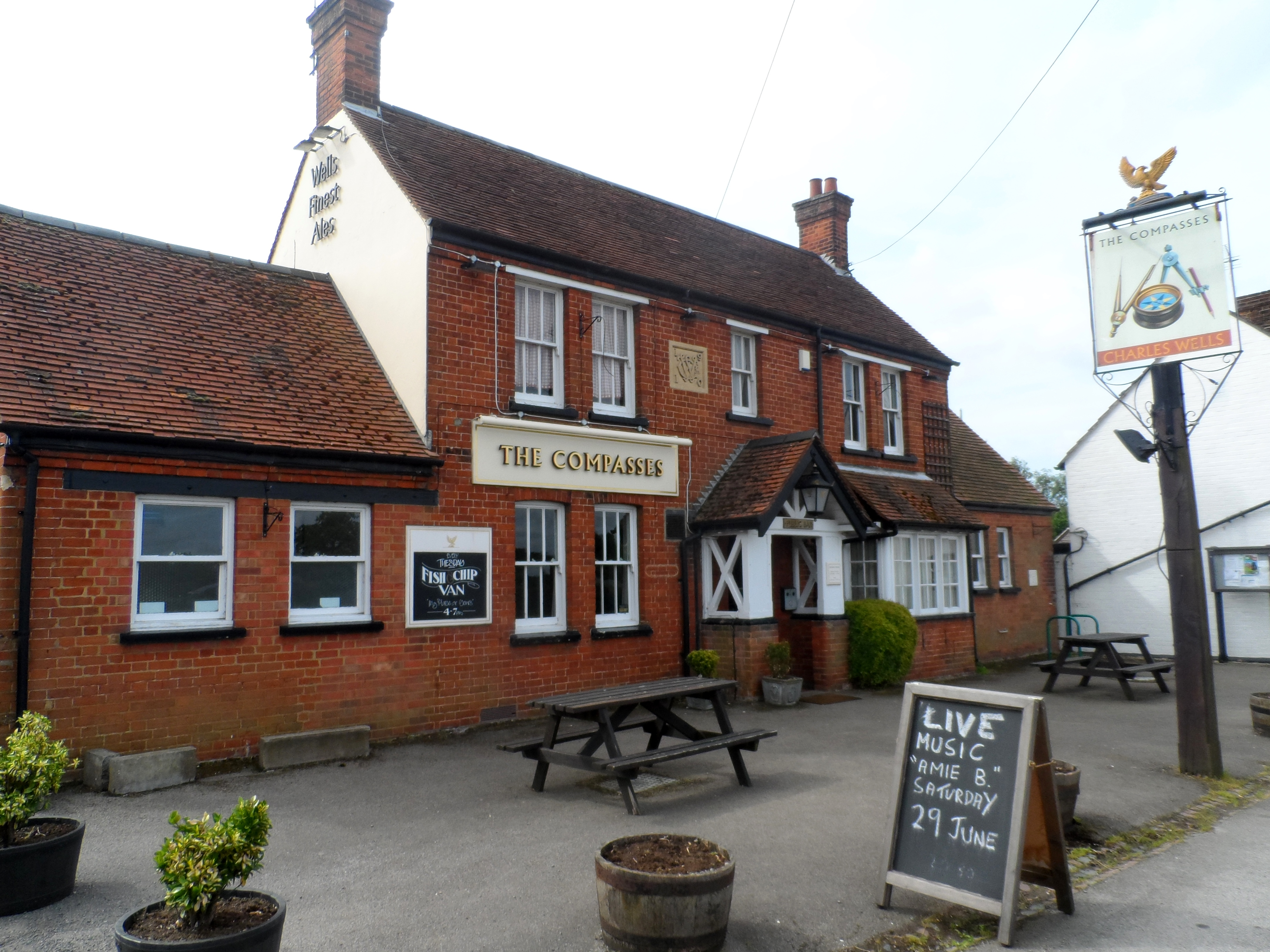
The Compasses

Due to closures, there is now only one public house in Greenfield called The Compasses. Three former pubs, were the Swan Beerhouse on Mill Lane which closed in 1909, the Nags Head Beerhouse on the High Street which closed in 1913, and the Old Bell Public House which closed more recently in 2007. There was also once a post office and store on Mill Lane, and the village store on the High Street (formerly Cockroft's), and a village school on School Lane that was later used as an artists studio by artist and sculptor James Butler. The former beer houses and stores are now private residences. A new village school was built on Pulloxhill road during the 1960s.

== History ==
The original agrarian folk community has had a long known history stretching back to the pre-Roman times. Evidence of an ancient settlement has been found on the adjacent woodland mire area of Flitwick Moor. Artifacts can be found in fields and ditches in Greenfield, mainly of flint scrapers and arrowheads from the Mesolithic era, and even into the Neolithic era and Iron Age due to the useful durable nature of the local flint. Ancient Briton relics respecting the Celtic god of thunder, such as a Wheel of Taranis, have been found at the Ruxox site, which in the 1220s became the Ruxox Cell of Dunstable Priory. Roman artefacts such as tiles, fragments of pots have and an altar to the cult of Bacchus have also been found locally at Ruxox (Hutchison 1986).

During the last decade of the 18th century, field enclosure was introduced, quite late on in history, and riots were instigated by local tenants who gathered to protest as their livelihood was under threat. Further threat to the local folk way of life would also come from the relatively late introduction of Protestant Christian thought in the area. Greenfield was expanded in the 19th century as a Methodist settlement alongside the Church of England settlement at Flitton. Temperance meetings were introduced and organised by newcomer nobility from Wrest Park, which led to the demise of two key local beerhouses that served the traditional folk community at the time.

During Victorian times, the local Lady Cowper visited Greenfield from Wrest Park, and described Greenfield as "an 'End'- 'a long straggly, fenny place with poor housing and rough people. Many were originally squatters and built makeshift houses". There was significant hardship at this time with some families taking bread from charity. There were still "Poor Rights" for the locals which allowed them to cut peat from the Moors for drying and burning. There were ten shareholders of Flitton Moor who paid 15 shillings a share and Greenfield Moor divided into 6 portions at 12 shillings each.

The local primary school (once located on School Lane) was built during the time of Church of England school development era to improve literacy and "elevate the local populace" from superstitious beliefs. This is now a private residence and the primary school was moved to Pulloxhill road during the late 1960s.

Regarding health care during the Victorian times, cottagers had to pay between 1 shilling and 10 shillings a year depending on the treatment, and the very poor who could not afford the fee would have to rely on local folk treatments and cures.

The area was once well known as a strawberry-producing area, and the fields were full of strawberry plants on either side of the main road. Carts would take the strawberries to Luton until the 1920s when a blight and a series of rook infestations destroyed the crop.

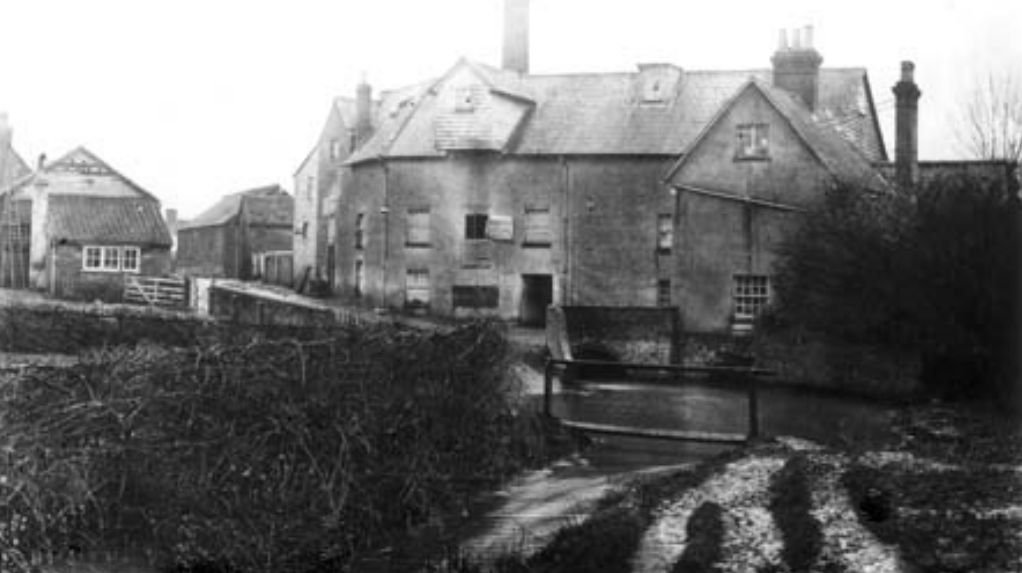
Greenfield Mill, 1900

Mill Lane was named after the watermill that ground wheat and barley corn until the 1950s and was located at the bottom of the lane. The mill was fed by a millpond, now a stream at the west side of the lane, and the outflow ran downhill into a ford that filled up when the mill was grinding corn. When grinding stopped, the river was diverted using sluice gates around the back of the mill. The mill photographed was built in the mid 19th century, although the records of Dunstable Priory indicate that there has been a mill on the site since at least year 1200 that served Ruxox Augustinian Ruxox Cell and local community. After a series of local disputes, Greenfield Mill was unused and became derelict from 1959 to 1970 when it was demolished to make way for houses.

The bridleway at the bottom of Mill Lane is the scene of an unsolved murder. In 1939, a worker from the nearby Ruxox Farm was attacked with "maniac brutality" on his way to his lodgings at the White Hart Inn in Flitton List of unsolved murders in the United Kingdom. The silver coins of his wage packet had been taken but the rest was left with the smashed body. During the investigation, the local mill disputes and folk theories relating to ancient artefacts being removed from Ruxox farm (the site of both ancient Celtic and Roman shrines) were dismissed by the local police. Scotland Yard concluded that the murder was more likely committed by a passing vagrant. The verdict on police records was stated as "murder by person or persons unknown".

== Local tradition and folklore ==
There are regular fairs and fetes at Flitton and Greenfield Village Hall, which also serves as a communal recreation ground. A traditional method of "stone picking" was adopted during the development of the recreation ground when local children were asked to pick stones from the field by hand to remove the bad fortune associated with the 1920s strawberry blight. Maypole dancing was used for several years on May Day as a further example of Celtic pagan tradition. Accordingly, a carnival procession using carts and later tractors, from Westoning to Flitton would be used to start off the May Day celebrations. Fetes continue to be held on the site most years. A travelling funfair was once a regular feature of the field next to the Old Bell Public House in Greenfield. Fetes and fairs were also traditionally held in the field next to Moat Farm. Both of these sites are now occupied by private residences.

There are ancient possibly Celtic practices relating to the water and peat resources of the local surrounding areas of Greenfield. Traditionally, people have deemed the water of the local fields and woods to hold magical and healing qualities. One old piece of local folklore recommends standing in the middle of Maggots Moor field and spinning full circle clockwise through the directions of the compass three times with eyes shut. If not struck by lightning, one is said to attain fortune and courage. Washing one's hands or feet in the adjoining river is said to be a tonic for the health (Gurney & Jackson, 1903). The neighbouring Folly Wood was once the home of Henry King Stevens, an eccentric taxidermist and entrepreneur who used the water source on his property to start a bottled tonic water company in the 19th century. His product was even featured in the Lancet for its potential medical benefits. However, he died of unknown causes before being able to profit from exploiting Folly Wood's water source. The wood is now protected as a special site of scientific interest due to its habitat for wading birds, snakes, newts, mushrooms and other rare flora.

Local legend has it that the ghosts of two grain delivery men on a horse-drawn cart can be seen or heard chatting and travelling along Mill Lane at twilight. Also, when the spring rains flood the stream, the millpond returns to flood the existing gardens and it is said that the mill wheel can be heard running and grinding corn. These are considered to be benign or signs of good luck.

There have been reported supernatural occurrences relating to both Christian and ancient sites in the area. A terrifying ghostly figure was reported in the Wesleyan Methodist Chapel on Mill Lane at several times by children and adult members of the church before the chapel was gutted by fire in the 1960s. In corroborating stories, local residents also reported unexplained "cold spots" and menacing rooks outside the front of the building before thunder storms. The chapel has since been converted into a private residence.

Similarly, an apparition in the shape of an intimidating hooded figure brandishing a heavy staff was reported by several local residents to be haunting the derelict mill during the 1950s. This apparition was also reported at night during the mid 1970s in the gardens of residences that were built on the site of the mill, and several times more recently on the tree shaded bridleway to Ruxox Farm. Sightings of such hooded figures have also been reported along the Flit valley in the grounds of Flitwick Manor, the Ridgeway ancient track, Deadman's Hill Clophill, and Chicksands Priory (O'Dell 2008).

== Residents ==
- Calum Davenport English Footballer
- Tony Read Luton Footballer, ran the Old Bell Inn until 1984
- James Butler lived and worked in the old school

== Sources ==
- Gurney & Jackson (1903) Transactions of the Hertfordshire Natural History Society and Field Club, Volumes 11–12
- Hutchinson V.J., (1986) Bacchus in Roman Britain: the evidence for his cult, Volume 1 Volume 151 of British archaeological reports. Publisher: B.A.R., 1986
- O'Dell (2008) Paranormal Bedfordshire. Amberley Publishing ISBN 1848681194, 9781848681194
