= Flitwick Moor =

Nature reserve in the United Kingdom

Coordinates: 52.007629°N 0.476766°W

- Site of Special Scientific Interest
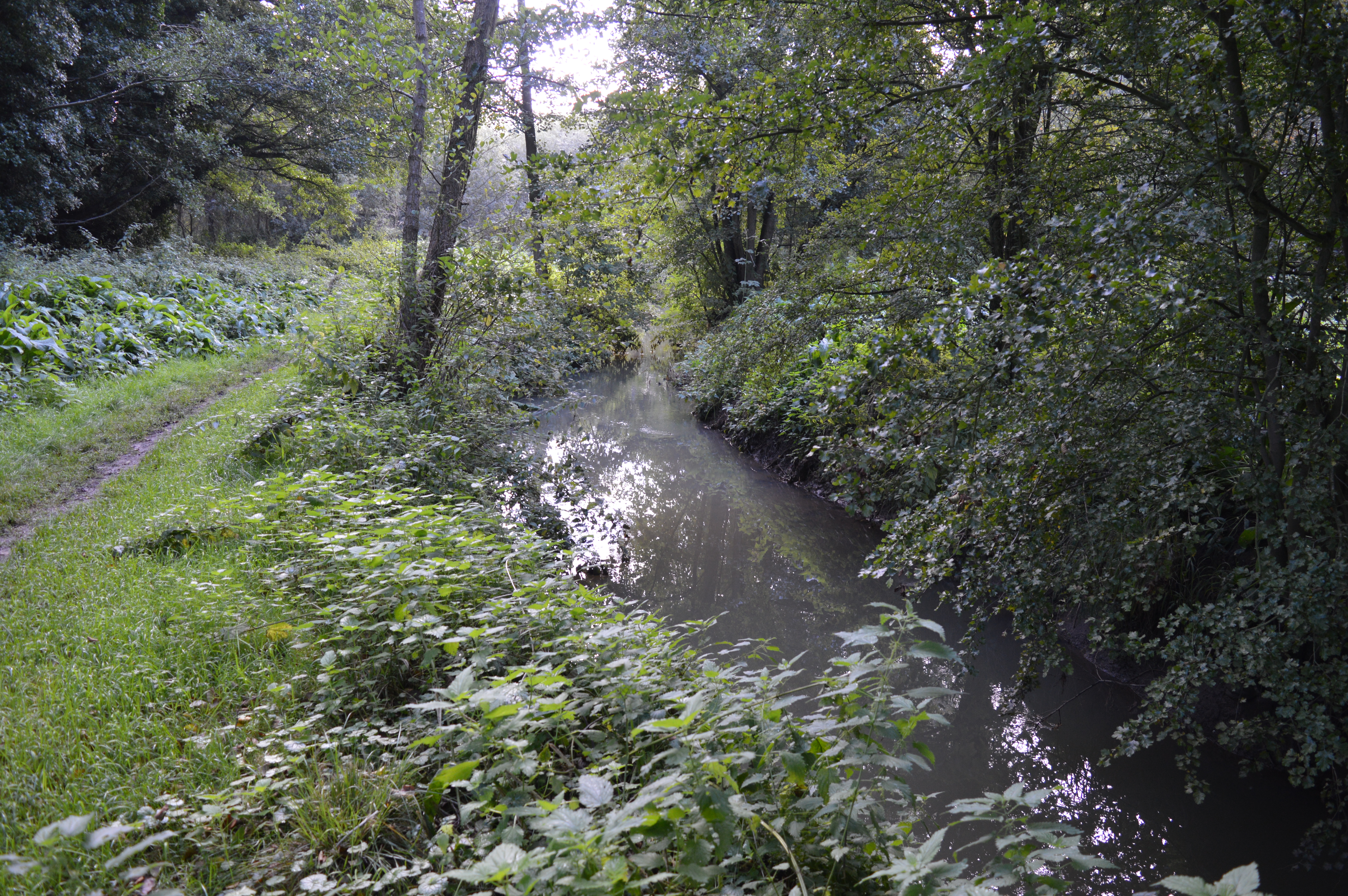
- The River Flit in Flitwick Moor
- Location of Flitwick Moor.
- Area of search: Bedfordshire
- Grid reference: TL045350
- Interest: Biological
- Area: 59.8 ha (148 acres)
- Notification date: 1984
- Location map: Magic Map

Flitwick Moor is a 59.8-hectare (148-acre) biological Site of Special Scientific Interest between Flitwick and Greenfield in Bedfordshire. It was notified under Section 28 of the Wildlife and Countryside Act 1981 in 1984 and the local planning authority is Central Bedfordshire Council. The site is managed by the Wildlife Trust for Bedfordshire, Cambridgeshire and Northamptonshire.

This is a rich valley mire, and the largest area of wetland in Bedfordshire. Eight species of sphagnum bog moss have been recorded, including one which is nationally rare. The site has areas of woodland as well as wet grassland. The area managed by the Wildlife Trust is 66.6 hectares: it includes Folly Wood, which was added to the site in 2007.

There is access from Greenfield Road, which bisects the site.
