= Flitton and Greenfield =

- Civil parish
- Interactive map of Flitton and Greenfield
- Coordinates: 52.000°N 0.473°W
- Country: England
- Primary council: Central Bedfordshire
- County: Bedfordshire
- Region: East of England
- Status: Parish
- Main settlements: Flitton; Greenfield

Government
  - Type: Parish Council
  - UK Parliament: Mid Bedfordshire

Population (2011)
  - Total: 1,415
- Postal code: MK45
- Area code: MK

Flitton and Greenfield is a civil parish in Bedfordshire, England. It consists of Flitton and Greenfield.

Flitton and Greenfield are two small hamlets in rural Mid Bedfordshire, situated along the river Flitt and adjoining Flitwick moor.
