= Chalton, Bedfordshire =

Village in Bedfordshire, England

Coordinates: 51.9260°N 0.5009°W

Chalton
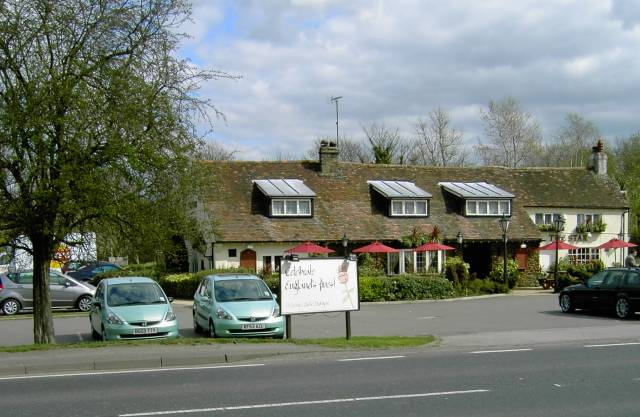
- The Star public house

- Location within Bedfordshire
- Population: 554 (parish)
- OS grid reference: TL032263
- Unitary authority: Central Bedfordshire
- Ceremonial county: Bedfordshire
- Region: East
- Country: England
- Sovereign state: United Kingdom
- Post town: LUTON
- Postcode district: LU4
- Police: Bedfordshire
- Fire: Bedfordshire
- Ambulance: East of England

Chalton is a village and civil parish in the Central Bedfordshire district of Bedfordshire, England, immediately north of the Luton/Dunstable conurbation and bounded to the east by the M1 motorway and the Midland Main Line railway line.

A footpath, locally known as the "Bound Way", borders the village to the south and south west. This path now forms part of the Chiltern Way.

The fields around Chalton below Carters hill are the source of the River Flit.

Nearby places are Toddington (north west), Chalgrave (west), Houghton Regis (south west), and Sundon (east).

== Listed buildings ==
There are several Grade II listed buildings in Chalton, including Gostelow House and Yew Tree Farm.

== Education ==
Chalton Lower School stands in the centre of the village and accepts children between ages 4 and 9.

== Hospitality ==
The local public house is called The Star.

== Media ==
Chalton became the centre of media attention in 2010 when, in a breakthrough case, a local woman was acquitted of keeping a brothel.

== Trivia ==
During the second world war a German bomber jettisoned a stick of bombs in Chalton, which fell on Carters hill and on the fields between the village and The Bound Way. All the bombs exploded but did no damage.

== Sundon Substation ==
The civil parish contains a main electricity substation, to the west of the M1, south of Toddington services. From here, a 400kv line of pylons travels northwards all the way to West Burton power station. This 150-mile line was the first full section to be built of the supergrid in 1965. The 500 MW / 4 GWh (8-hour) Sundon grid battery is scheduled for 2030.
