= Edward Shepherd =

British architect

Edward Shepherd (died 1747) was a prominent London-based English architect and developer in the Georgian period.

== Architectural work ==
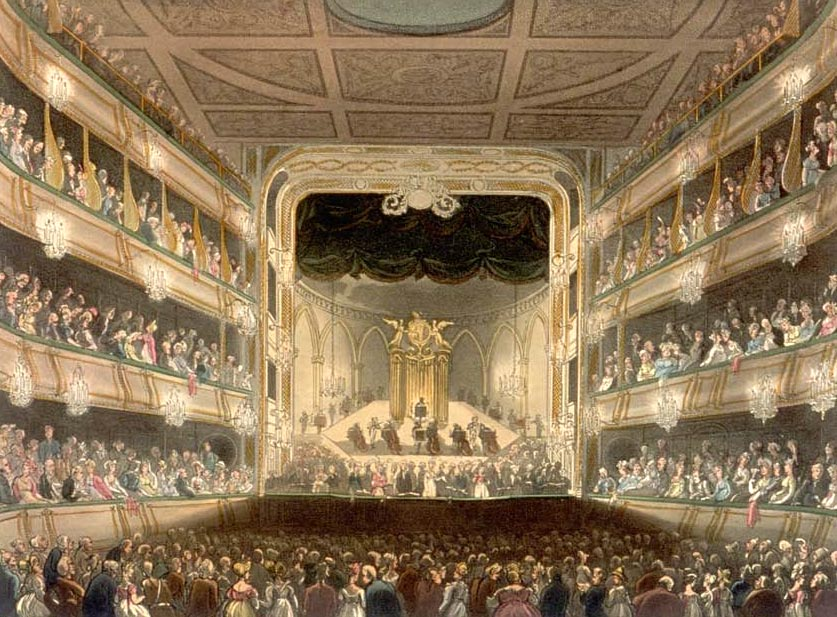
Theatre Royal, Covent Garden, London.

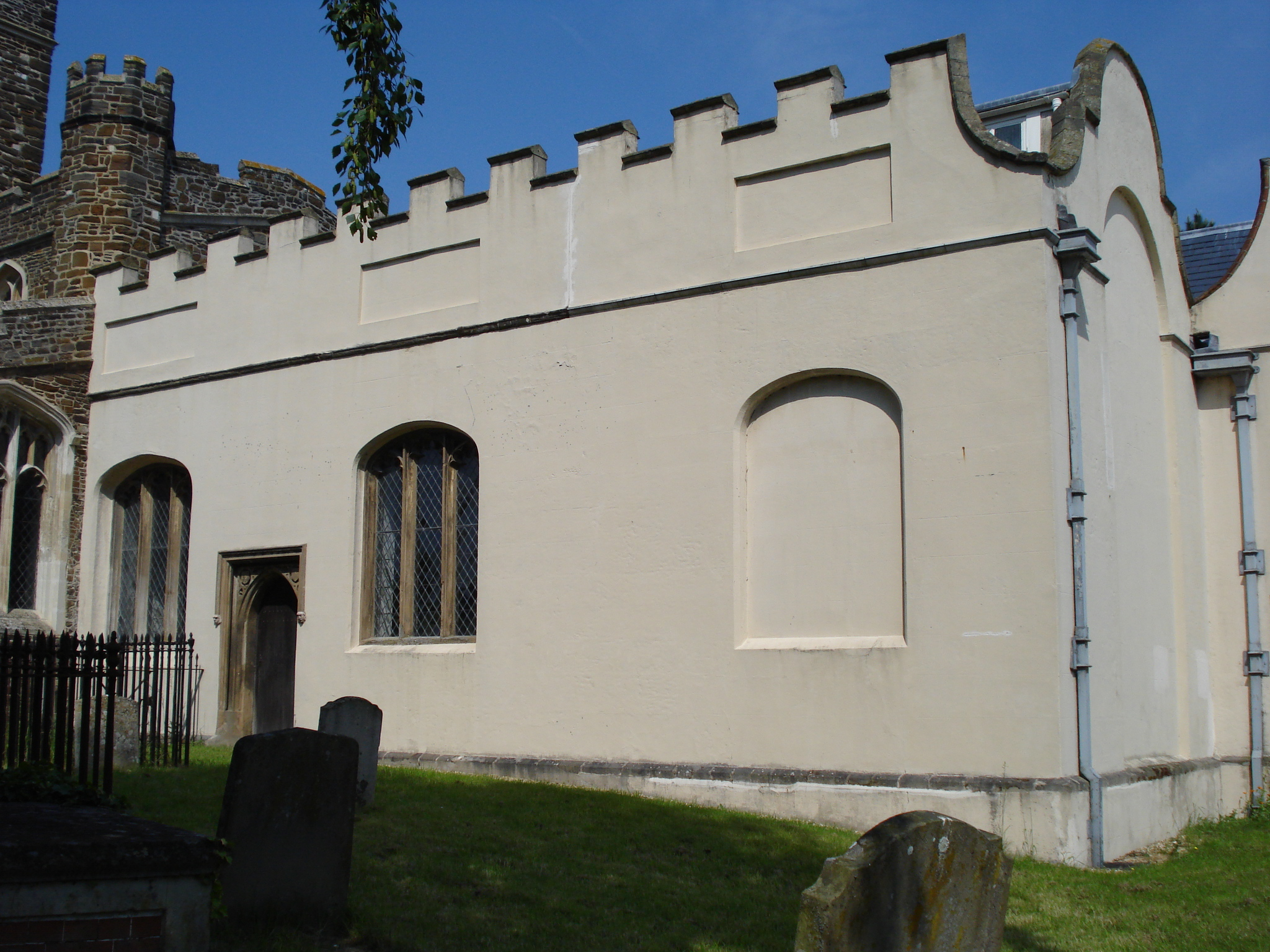
De Grey Mausoleum, Flitton, Bedfordshire.

Shepherd worked on the following projects, among others:

- Cannons, a house for James Brydges, 1st Duke of Chandos (1673–1744), in Middlesex (1723–25, now demolished).
- Houses in Cavendish Square, London (1724–28).
- Great Stanmore Rectory, Middlesex (1725).
- Houses in Brook Street, London (1725–29).
- Houses in St James's Square, London (1726–8), including No. 4, the Naval & Military Club and a former home of Nancy Astor from 1912 to 1942.
- Palace-fronted buildings for the 1st Duke of Chandos in Grosvenor Square, London (c1728–30, now demolished).
- Goodman's Fields Theatre, Ayliffe Street, Whitechapel, London (opened October 1732, demolished in 1746).
- Theatre Royal, Covent Garden in London; renamed the Royal Opera House in 1892 (the Shepherd-designed building opened December 1732, destroyed by fire 1808).
- Development of Shepherd Market and adjoining streets in Mayfair, London (1735–46).
- Houses in South Audley Street, Mayfair, London (1736–37).
- Work on De Grey Mausoleum, Church of St John the Baptist, Flitton, Bedfordshire (1739–40).

Much of Shepherd's architectural work has been demolished, however his eponymous Shepherd Market has survived.
