= Anthony Grey, Earl of Harold =

English noble

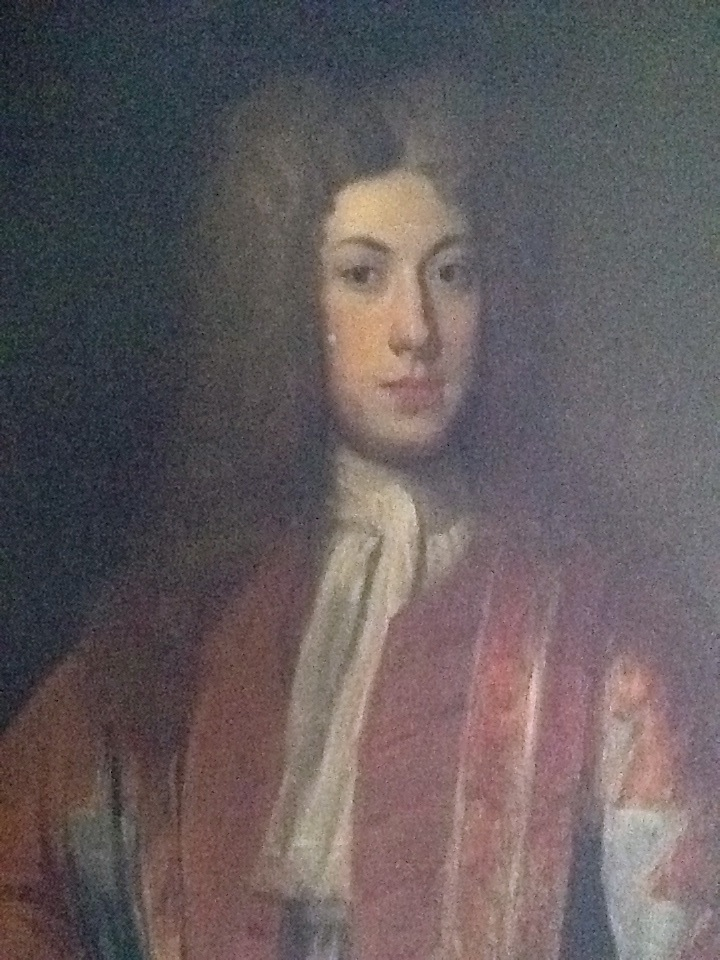
- Anthony Grey, 3rd Baron Lucas
- Born: 21 February 1695
- Died: 21 July 1723 (aged 28)
- Parents: Henry Grey (father); Mary Tufton (mother)

Anthony Grey, 3rd Baron Lucas, styled Earl of Harold (21 February 1695 – 21 July 1723) was a British peer and courtier.

== Biography ==
Grey was the eldest son of Henry Grey, 1st Duke of Kent, and his wife, Jemima Crew.

On 17 February 1718, Anthony married Lady Mary Tufton, a daughter and coheiress of Thomas Tufton, 6th Earl of Thanet, by his wife Lady Catharine Cavendish.

He was called to the House of Lords, by writ of acceleration in his father's barony of Lucas, on 8 November 1718.

Lord Harold was a Lord of the Bedchamber to George, Prince of Wales, later King George II, from 1720 until his death in 1723, aged 28, from choking on an ear of barley, the beard of which stuck in his throat. He had no children, so his title reverted to his father and his wife later married John Leveson-Gower, 1st Earl Gower.

Peerage of England
Preceded by Henry Grey	Baron Lucas (writ of acceleration); 1718–1723	Succeeded by Henry Grey
