= Wrest Park =

Country estate in Bedfordshire, England

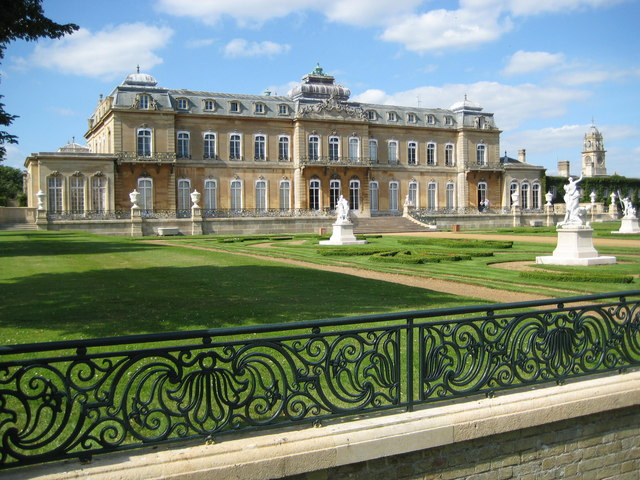
- Wrest Park house, from the south

- Location within Bedfordshire

General information
- Type: Country estate
- Location: Silsoe, Bedfordshire, England
- Coordinates: 52.0080°N 0.4121°W
- Ordnance Survey: TL0912935583
- Year built: 1834–39

Design and construction
- Architect: Thomas de Grey, 2nd Earl de Grey
- Designations: Grade I listed building

Website
- Wrest Park

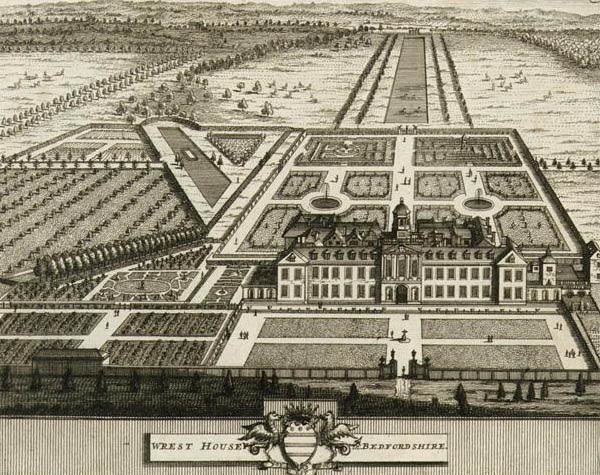
Wrest Park c. 1708; this building was replaced in the 1830s

Wrest Park is a country estate located in Silsoe, Bedfordshire, England. It comprises Wrest Park, a country house, and Wrest Park gardens, both of which are grade I listed. The gardens surround the mansion and include a number of other buildings, monuments and statues, some of which are grade II listed, and an early-18th-century baroque pavilion, designed by Thomas Archer, which is a grade I listed building. The garden entrance of the house aligns with the pavilion, and the long water and pathways from the house that precede it.

Between the 13th and 20th centuries the house was occupied by the de Grey family, a family who held positions including Lord High Treasurer of England. The early 18th-century gardens were created for Henry Grey, 1st Duke of Kent, who along with commissioning Thomas Archer to create buildings in the grounds, employed Batty Langley to design a bowling green house. During this time, the gardens were enlarged and a woodland garden with canals enclosing it were added to the estate. Subsequent generations of the family employed gardeners and landscape architects, including Lancelot "Capability" Brown, to develop the estate further.

The current house was built by Thomas de Grey, 2nd Earl de Grey in the 1830s, in a Louis XV style that is unique in England. His visits to Paris and illustrations in Jacques-François Blondel's publications provided the inspiration for Thomas, who was the first president of the Royal Institute of British Architects, to build the house in this style. The interior state rooms are adorned with Rococo-style gilt and white plasterwork, which experienced a revival in the 19th century. Since the construction, the plan layout of the house and decoration in the state rooms have been well preserved and three rooms contain rare wallpapers.

English Heritage own the estate, have managed it since 2006, and have undertaken an extensive restoration project. Parts of the house and the gardens are open to the public. English Heritage house an archeological collection store at Wrest Park in a purpose-built building that was opened to the public in 2014, which holds over 150,000 artefacts. Wrest Park has been used as a filming location, including for television period dramas such as Belgravia and Bridgerton.

== History ==
From the Middle Ages, until the early 20th century, Wrest Park (almost continuously) belonged to the de Grey family. The feudal aids detail Reginald de Grey, 1st Baron Grey de Wilton, being a landowner in Flitton and Silsoe between 1284 and 1286 and Chancery papers about Reginald's assets when he died specify a "capital mesuage with a dovecote worth 4 shillings per annum", presumably in reference to the inception of the original house. The family gained prominence throughout the Middle Ages, in particular when Edmund Grey, 1st Earl of Kent, assisted Edward IV at the Battle of Northampton and was subsequently made Lord High Treasurer of England and Earl of Kent in the 1460s.

As anticipated by his father, George Grey, 2nd Earl of Kent, ownership of Wrest Park was relinquished by Richard Grey, 3rd Earl of Kent, in the early 16th century. Richard experienced financial difficulties, possibly due to gambling and fines. Richard's half brother Henry Grey, 4th Earl of Kent, managed to re-purchase the estate. An inventory made when Reginald Grey, 5th Earl of Kent, died in 1573 showed that the original house had been extended and more rooms had been added. Thomas Carew (1595–1640) wrote his country house poem "To My Friend G.N. from Wrest" in 1639, that described the old house.

Henry Grey, 1st Duke of Kent, was responsible for creating the woodland gardens in the early 18th century, he also commissioned baroque architect Thomas Archer to design buildings in the grounds. Jemima, 2nd Marchioness Grey, inherited Wrest Park in 1740, from her grandfather Henry, on the condition that she marry Philip Yorke, 2nd Earl of Hardwicke, the Lord Chancellor's son, who resided at Wimpole Hall. The marriage went ahead and in 1743 the couple moved into Wrest Park. Along with employing Lancelot "Capability" Brown, the couple were known for their literary circle of friends and family that they named Wrestiana, that included Charles Yorke, the antiquarian Daniel Wray, historian and writer Thomas Birch, author Catherine Talbot, and poet Thomas Edwards. The group created a manuscript of poems, plays and inscriptions, with one such inscription included on the gothic folly at Wimpole.

Amabel Hume-Campbell, 1st Countess De Grey, the daughter of Philip and Jemima, became the 5th Baroness Lucas of Crudwell, when her mother died in 1797. Whilst the marquessate of Grey could not transfer down the female line, Amabel became Countess in 1816 and when she died in 1833, Wrest Park was inherited by her nephew Thomas de Grey, 2nd Earl de Grey. Thomas was responsible for creating the existing house and upper gardens, and was elected as first president of the Royal Institute of British Architects in 1835. When Thomas died in 1859, his daughter Anne Florence, Countess Cowper, the wife of George Cowper, 6th Earl Cowper, inherited Wrest Park and was responsible for remodelling the Chinese summerhouse and rebuilding the Chinese bridge. Francis Thomas de Grey Cowper, 7th Earl Cowper, subsequently inherited Wrest Park. Francis did not have children so upon his death, the estate passed to his nephew, Auberon Herbert, 9th Baron Lucas, who in 1905 rented Wrest Park to the US diplomat Whitelaw Reid, at a cost of £1,500 per annum. During this time he was US ambassador to Great Britain, and in 1909 he wrote to President Roosevelt sharing the details of his recent shooting excursions on the estate, and he also entertained King Edward VII at Wrest Park.

Nan Ino Cooper, 10th Baroness Lucas, ran Wrest Park as a military hospital during World War I, although a fire in September 1916 halted this usage of the house. Following the death of her brother Auberon Herbert, 9th Baron Lucas, who died in action in 1916, she succeeded her brother, and put Wrest Park up for auction in 1917. It was sold after World War I to John Murray, a businessman involved in the brewery and coal industries. During his tenure, some of the garden statuary was sold, while felling stripped the garden of some old trees. Wrest Park was later purchased by Sun Insurance (who became Sun Alliance Insurance and are now known as RSA Insurance Group) who moved from offices in Threadneedle Street to Wrest Park, during World War II, building 12 huts and converting stables to house 300 employees. After the war the centre for modern agricultural engineering research was based at Wrest Park. English Heritage began to manage the house and gardens in 2006 and launched a 20-year restoration project.

=== Filming location ===
Wrest Park has been used as a location for filming including: the video for the 2008 song "The Fear" by Lily Allen; episodes of BBC's Flog It!, The Serpent and Countryfile; the films Flyboys and The Death of Stalin; and television drama series The Royals, Belgravia, and Bridgerton.

== Wrest Park house ==
The current grade I listed house at Wrest Park was built between 1834 and 1839 by Thomas de Grey, 2nd Earl de Grey. The house has two storeys (excluding the basement and attic), uses bath stone ashlar and has a mansard roof. It is unique for Britain, due to it being built and decorated in the style of Louis XV, in a single phase, with few layout alterations made since its construction. Thomas was influenced by architecture in France, and the inspiration for the design of the house that is north facing, was based on illustrations of Hotel Matignon in Paris, in Jacques-François Blondel's Architecture Française (1752). This side has thirteen bays, three project outwards at the entrance, with further projection to either end of the building, on top of which there are leaded cupola. Inside the entrance it is single storey with a pavilion style roof. The statues in the staircase hall have been at Wrest Park since the current building was built. Outside the entrance is a balcony where the parapet incorporates the Grey family coat of arms.

The south facing garden front was based on a design in Jacques-François Blondel's Maisons de Plaisance (1737). It includes fifteen bays and sculptural work by John Edward Carew. The windows retain the original blind boxes. Outside, the dark stone terrace leads to the gardens, down steps. Piers either side of the steps support a pair of molossian dogs made from portland stone. There is a cross axis of enfilades between the entrance, staircase and library in the house, which aligns with the long water and Archer Pavilion, and the state rooms. Although the house is not situated where the previous building was, this alignment was preserved and created additional distance between the house and Archer Pavilion. The library and drawing room ceilings were decorated by John Wood. The dining room incorporates a fireplace mantel taken from the family's London home. State rooms, which have been well preserved in their original form, are decorated with Rococo gilt and white plasterwork and are some of the earliest Rococo Revival interiors in England. The Countess's sitting room is also a fine example of this style of interior. A room on the first floor, in the north-west corner includes wallpaper in an "El Dorado" pattern which is created using flora and fauna from four different continents. This wallpaper was printed and includes 120 different colours. It was made by French company Zuber & Cie in 1849, which is very rarely found in England. During restoration work in 2006, English Heritage uncovered rare 18th-century Chinese wallpaper behind panelling in two rooms in the south front, on the first floor. The wallpaper in one room includes a bird and flower pattern and in the other room the pattern depicts scenes of life and occupations in China. They were subsequently restored.

When the house was built James Clephan was employed as clerk of the work, who had previously been clerk of the works at the Liddell seat, Ravensworth Castle in County Durham, and had recently served as professional amanuensis and builder for Lord Barrington. Although Nikolaus Pevsner, in his 1968 volume Bedfordshire, Huntingdon and Peterborough in the Buildings of England series, incorrectly identified Clephan (Cléphane) as "an otherwise unknown French architect" and attributed the design of the house to him, other authors including Simon Jenkins, William Page, Mark Girouard and Howard Colvin are clear that the design was by Thomas. The 2014 revised Bedfordshire, Huntingdon and Peterborough, as edited by Charles O'Brien, corrects the earlier guide, emphasising that Thomas assumed responsibility for the design of the house.

== Wrest Park gardens ==
Wrest Park has an early-18th-century garden, that is grade I listed and spread over 92 acres (37 ha). Henry Grey, 1st Duke of Kent, increased the size of the gardens, created a woodland area around the long water, added formal canals that surround the woodland garden that include avenues, and a number of buildings were constructed in the grounds, some which survive to this day. From the garden entrance of the house, the park is divided by a central pathway, and later by a long water leading onto the pavilion. In 1726, east and west half houses were constructed in small clearings either side of the long water. These contain arched openings, with semi circular seating, are of slightly different design and both are grade II listed.

The garden designer Batty Langley was employed in the 1730s, and is credited with creating the bowling green house. In 1736 Horace Walpole visited Wrest on a progress through Northamptonshire and Bedfordshire. He noted monuments in the garden in memory of the Duke of Kent's children who all predeceased him, as well as a monument to Kent himself, at that time still alive. The gardens and garden houses were mapped by John Rocque twice, in 1735 and in 1737. There is a statue of Jemima, 2nd Marchioness Grey, reading a book in the gardens, thought to have been made by John Cheere in 1748. The boundary canals were altered for Jemima, by Capability Brown in a more informal English landscape garden style, whilst the design of the gardens was preserved. The bathhouse (sometimes referred to as a Roman bath, a hermitage and a grotto) was built, and its grounds laid out, between about 1769 and 1772.

Between 1834 and 1839, Thomas de Grey, 2nd Earl de Grey, designed a substantial walled garden, that incorporates earlier sculptures by Peter Scheemakers. During 1835 an orangery was added and a fireplace from the demolished house at Wrest Park was re-erected on its west wall. A Wellingtonia planted in 1856 was in its earlier years brought into the house annually to serve as a Christmas tree, one of the earliest surviving examples known in the UK. The obelisk in Trent Park was originally in the grounds of Wrest Park, but was sold in the 1930s when owner John Murray was struggling to sell the estate. This, along with two other monuments were purchased by Sir Philip Sassoon and moved. The obelisk was built as a dedication to George Grey, Earl of Harold, who died in the 1730s and was the son of Henry Grey, 1st Duke of Kent.

=== Archer Pavilion ===
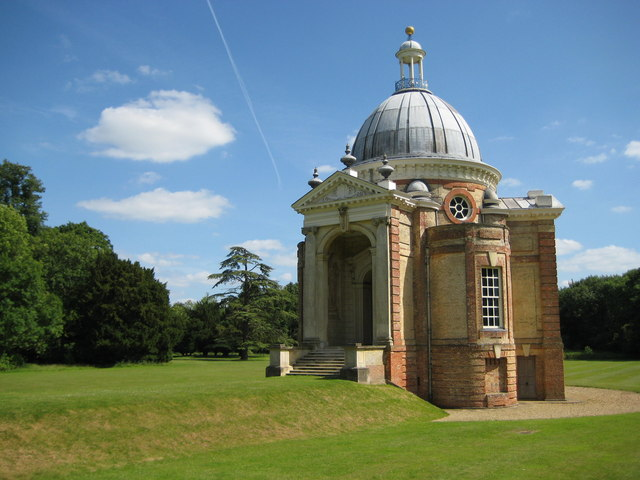
Pavilion designed by Thomas Archer

The Archer Pavilion was commissioned by Henry Grey, 1st Duke of Kent, and was built between 1709 and 1711. The layout was possibly influenced by Francesco Borromini's Sant'Ivo alla Sapienza. The pavilion was used as a banqueting house with a kitchen in the basement. It is grade I listed and described as being one of the most "accomplished and characteristic works of Thomas Archer", with features particularly symbolic of his work including canted pilasters and scrolled brackets. Its exterior uses different colours of brick with banded-brick rustication to create texture. Originally, the exterior was rendered. It has a central cupola that is very similar to one in St Philip's Cathedral in Birmingham, which Archer also designed, and sides of the central hexagonal chamber extend out to areas including seating by the windows. The interior of the pavilion is decorated with corinthian columns in trompe-l'œil, believed to have been completed in 1712, which conceal doorways that lead to passages containing staircases to the basement, and the upper floor pedimented wings that are situated to the south east and south west of the structure. The decoration is signed "Mr Hauduroy", and although this work has been attributed to Louis Hauduroy, subsequent research has suggested it was created by Mark Anthony Hauduroy. A complimentary structure to the pavilion, believed to have been completed in 1710, was demolished in 1830.

=== Capability Brown monument ===
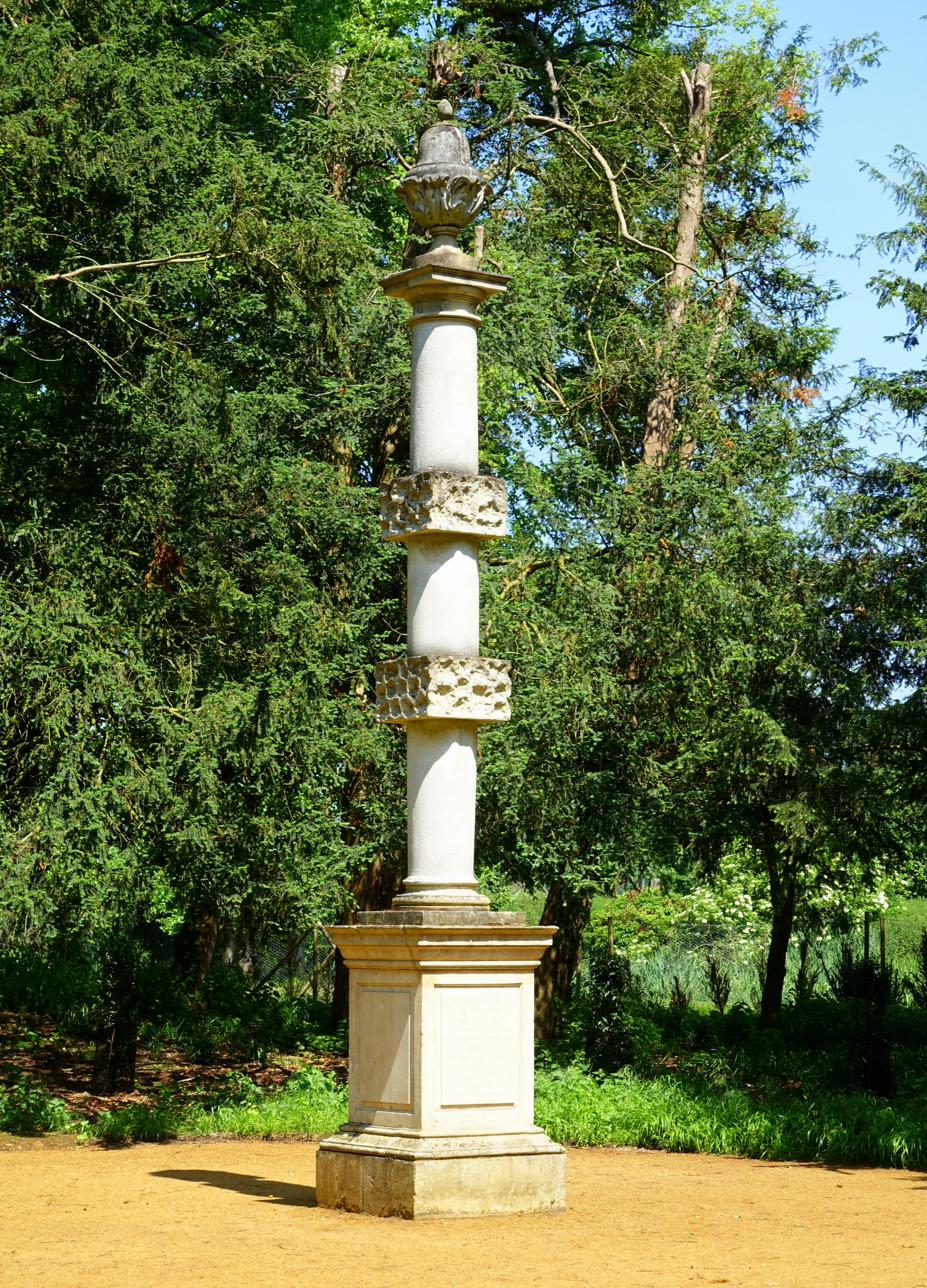
Capability Brown monument column

A monument column is dedicated to Lancelot "Capability" Brown. It was originally situated near the bowling green house, but is now located in the eastern part of the gardens. The column has the inscription: "These gardens, originally laid out by Henry Duke of Kent, were altered by Philip Yorke, 2nd Earl of Hardwicke and Jemima Campbell, 2nd Marchioness Grey with the professional assistance of Lancelot Brown Esq. in the years 1758, 1759, 1760." The monument is attributed to architect Edward Stevens and is grade II listed.

=== Chinese summerhouse and bridge ===
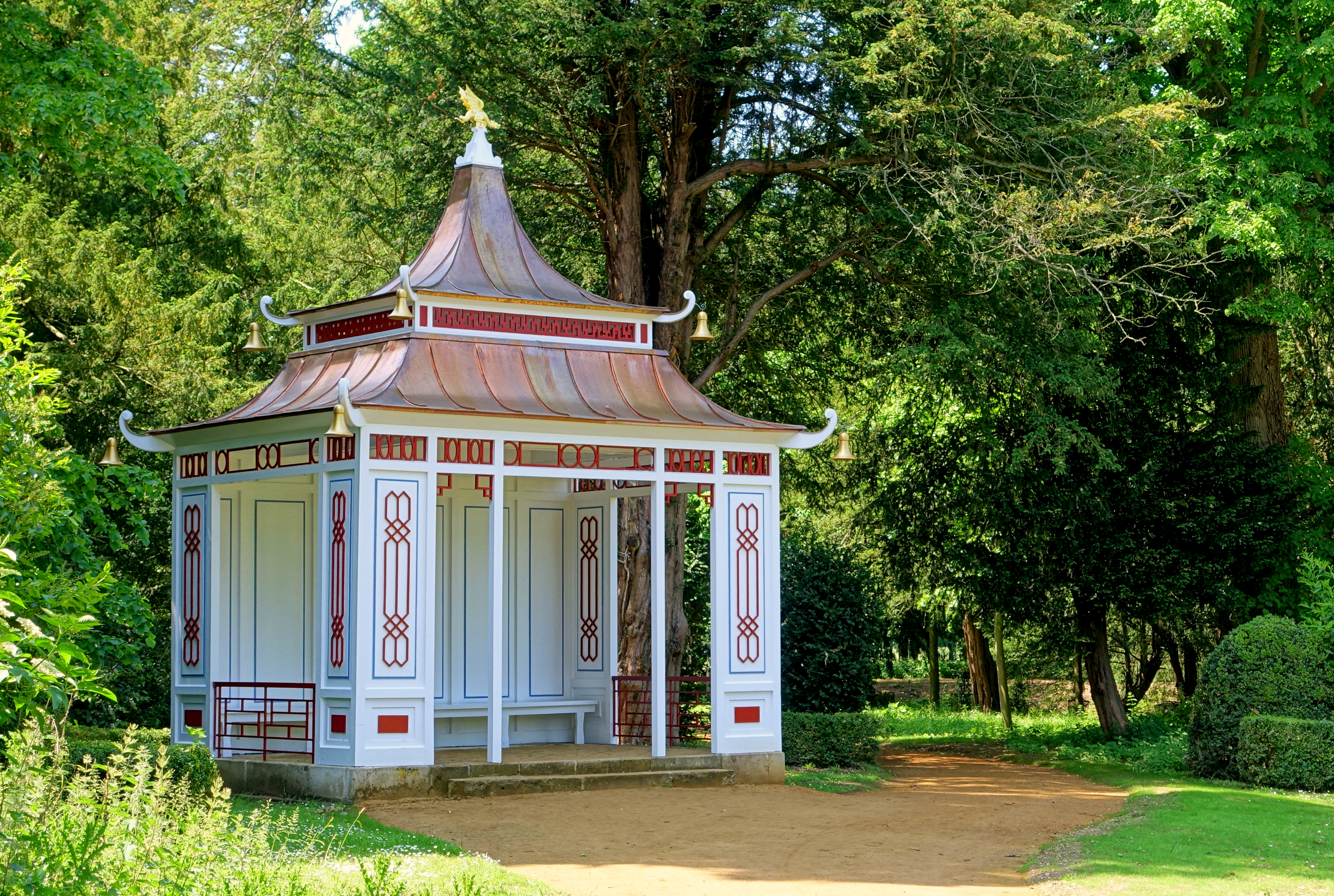
Chinese summer house

The Chinese summerhouse, also known as the Chinese temple, is located on the south side of the north broad water. It was commissioned by Jemima, 2nd Marchioness Grey, and was built around 1760, possibly to the designs of William Chambers. It was remodelled in 1876 and is a grade II listed building.

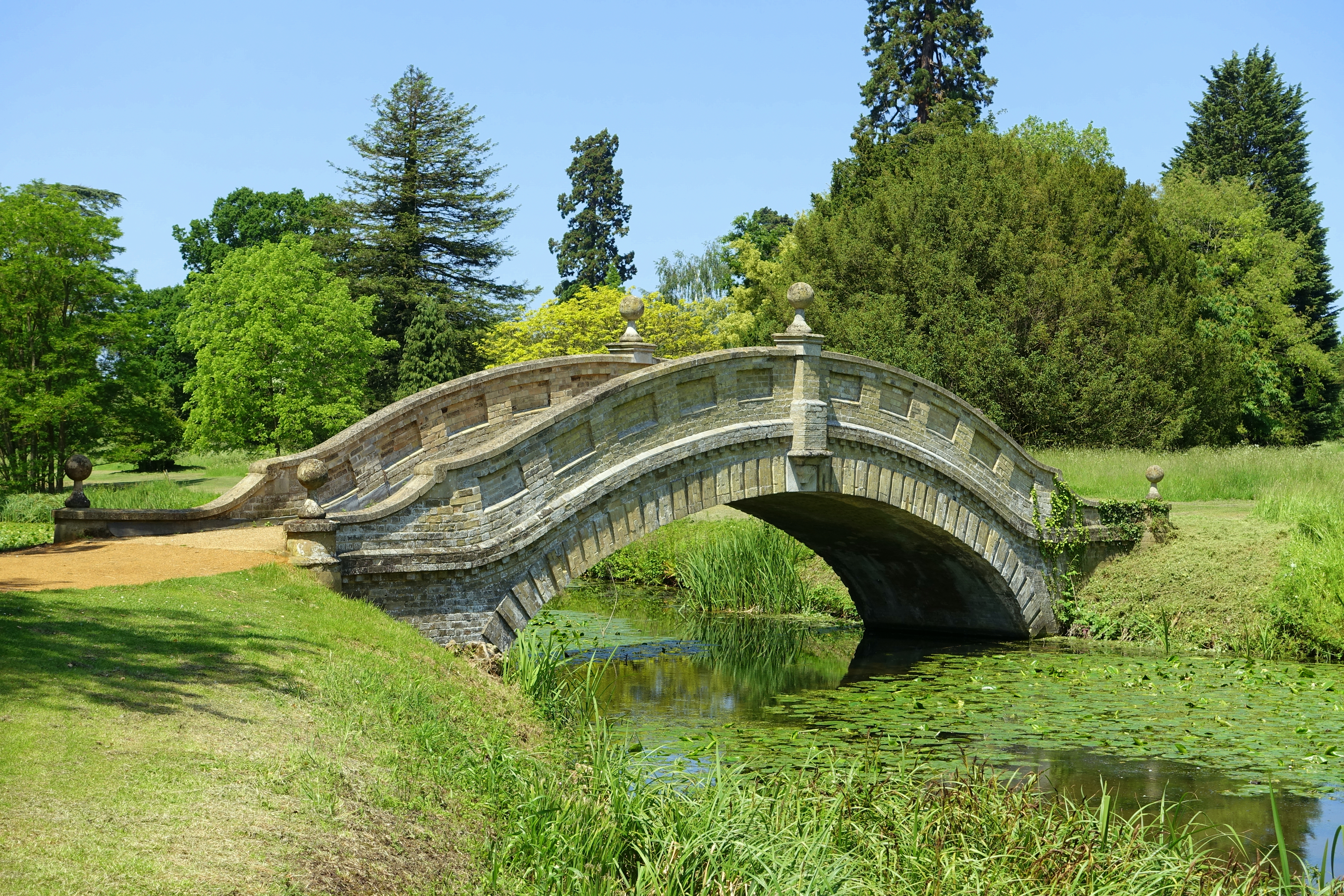
Chinese bridge

Located close to the Chinese summerhouse on the north broad water, the bridge was designed by Countess Cowper and built in 1876. This stone and brick bridge replaced a previous timber bridge, in the same location, that was built in the 1760s. There are stones that have a monogram of the construction date and Countess Cowper's initials. The bridge is grade II listed.

== Archaeological collections store ==
An English Heritage archaeological collection store is based at Wrest Park, within a £2m purpose-built facility, that opened to visitors in 2014. Over 150,000 artefacts from properties such as Kirby Hall in Northamptonshire and Hill Hall and Audley End House in Essex; historic sites including Viroconium Cornoviorum and Haughmond Abbey in Shropshire; and over 6,000 items from central London properties, that date from the 17th to the 19th century, are included in the collection which is available for public viewing via scheduled guided tours.

As the items were moved to the facility a database was created, allowing the artefacts to be located easily. The collection, which holds around a third of English Heritage architectural salvaged items includes fireplaces, doors, Victorian banisters and beams, prehistoric antlers and Roman bridges. The collection includes parts of painted window glass that were produced by Sir Christopher Hatton in the 17th century to impress Queen Elizabeth I that came from Kirby Hall, and bell jacks from the roof of Columbia Market.

== Restoration programme ==
In the autumn of 2007 English Heritage announced that the Wolfson Foundation had pledged up to £400,000 towards the restoration of the Wrest Park estate. They subsequently unveiled extensive plans to restore Wrest Park house and gardens to their original splendour, and in July 2010 they announced that they had secured over £1m from the Heritage Lottery Fund to develop a new visitors centre, car parking, exhibition space and accessible paths. Work was planned for the summer of 2011, and the park opened to the public on 4 August 2011.

English Heritage and Historic England have undertaken a number of in-depth investigations of the gardens at Wrest Park as part of the restoration process, including archaeological and geophysical surveys. The removal of an overgrown yew hedge, which maps suggested existed in 1717, led to a dendrochronological investigation on the trunks to discover if the trees removed were original or part of later re-plantings. The wood was found to date to 1780–1800.

A painting of sisters Jemima, Airmine and Elizabeth Crew by artist Jacob Huysmans, that was completed in the 17th century (around 1682) was acquired by English Heritage in 2015. Jemima Crew who married Henry Grey, 1st Duke of Kent, brought the painting to Wrest Park but it was removed when the estate was sold in 1917. The painting has been restored and is on display at Wrest Park.

The grounds at Wrest Park have over 70 monuments and statues. In 2021, English Heritage began restoring 18th-century statues by sculptor John Cheere in the parterre garden, as part of a wider restoration effort, after paint had begun to peel on the statues. The statues are part of a set of four depicting Aeneas and Anchises, the Abduction of Helen of Troy, Venus and Adonis, and Meleager and Atalanta, and are grade II* listed.

== Gallery ==
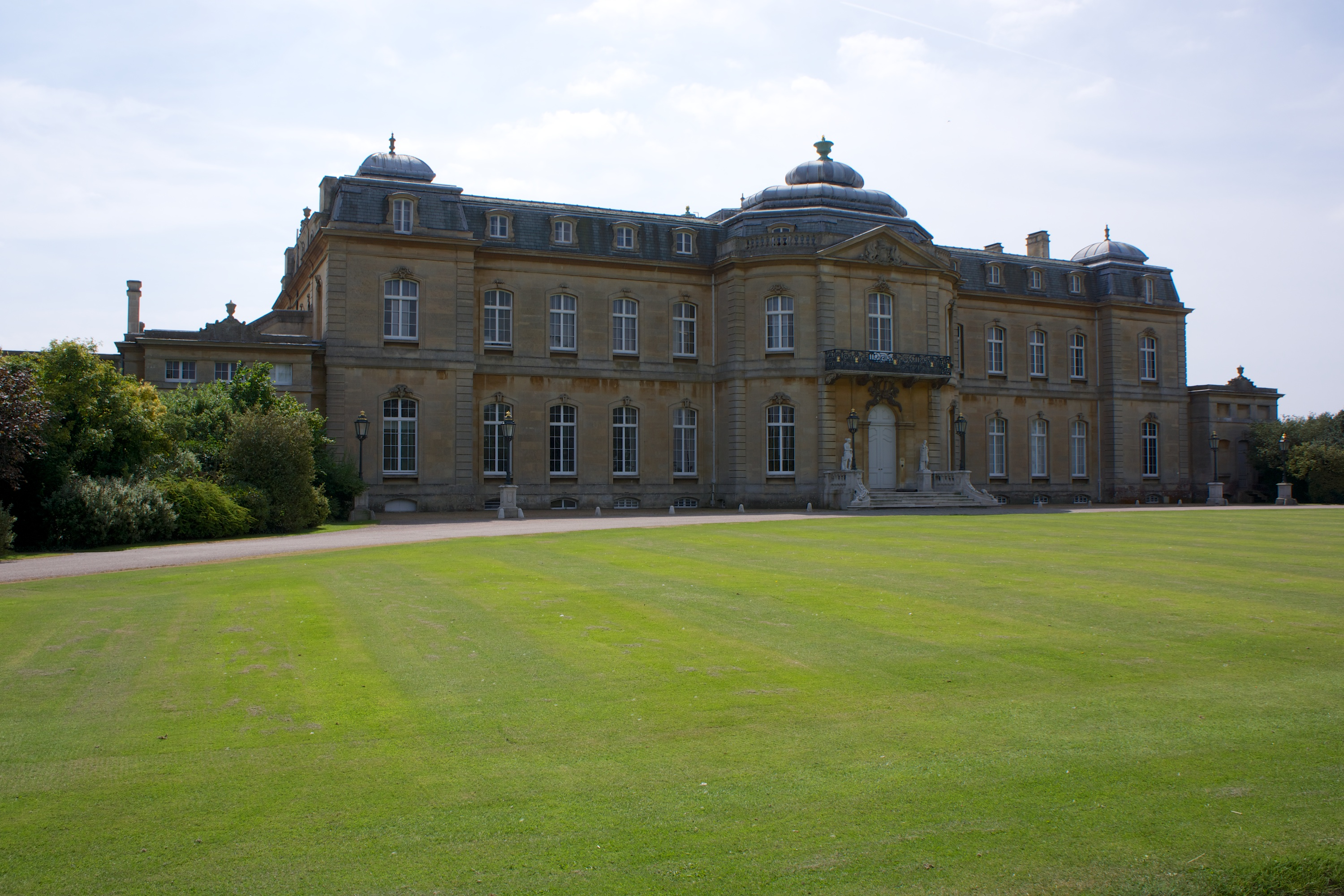
Wrest Park house, from the north

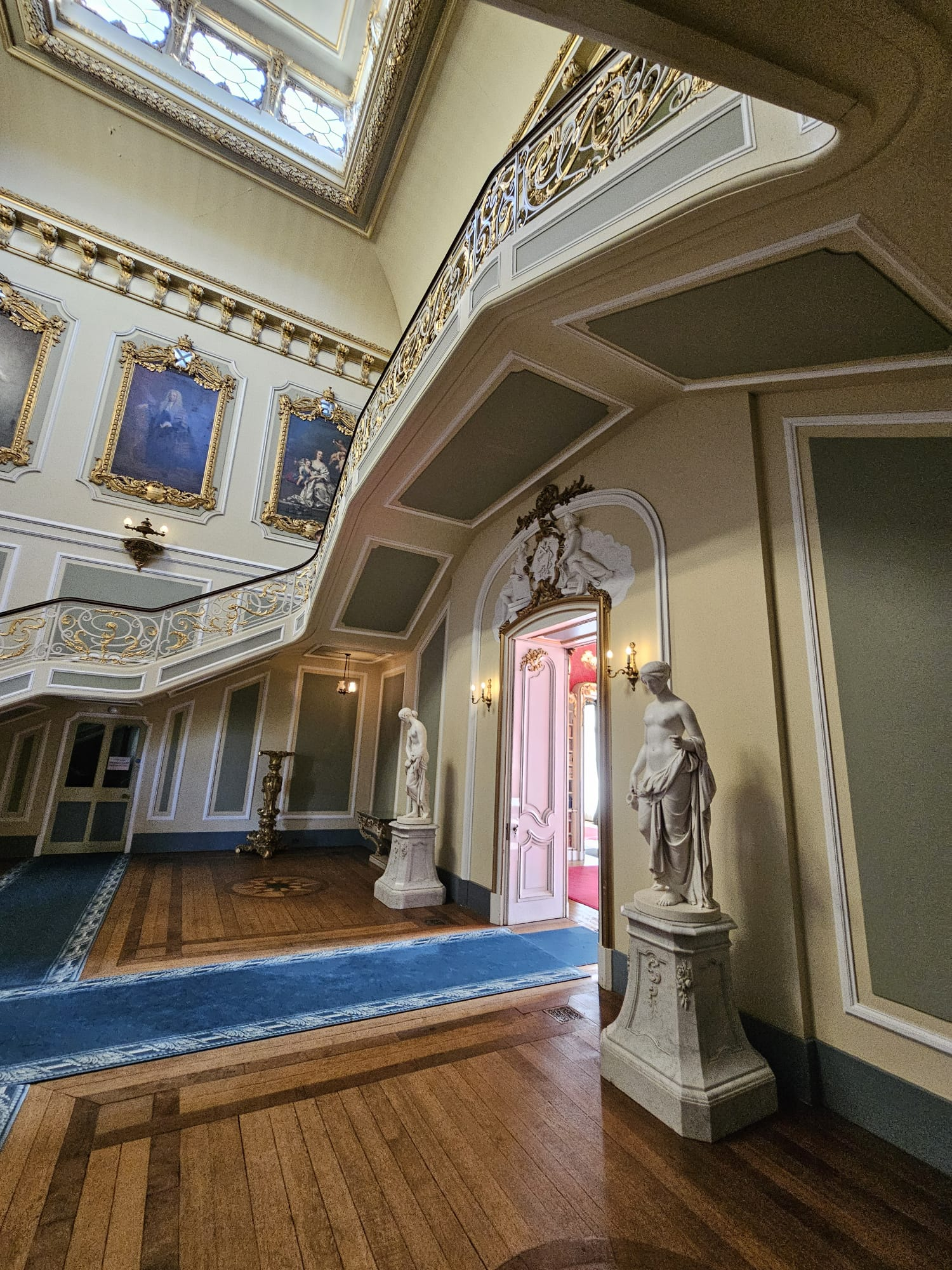
Wrest Park house, grand staircase and statues

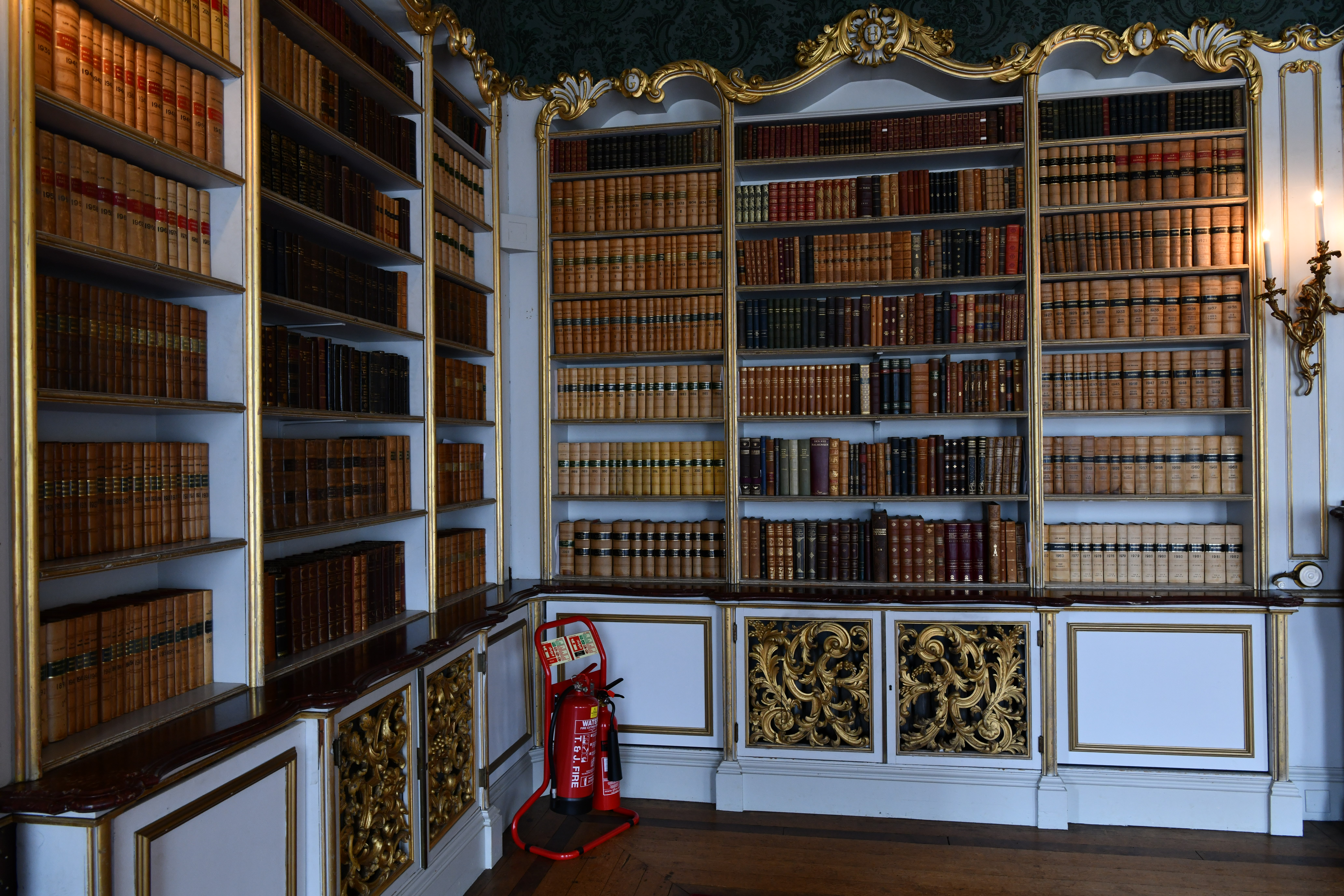
Wrest Park house, library

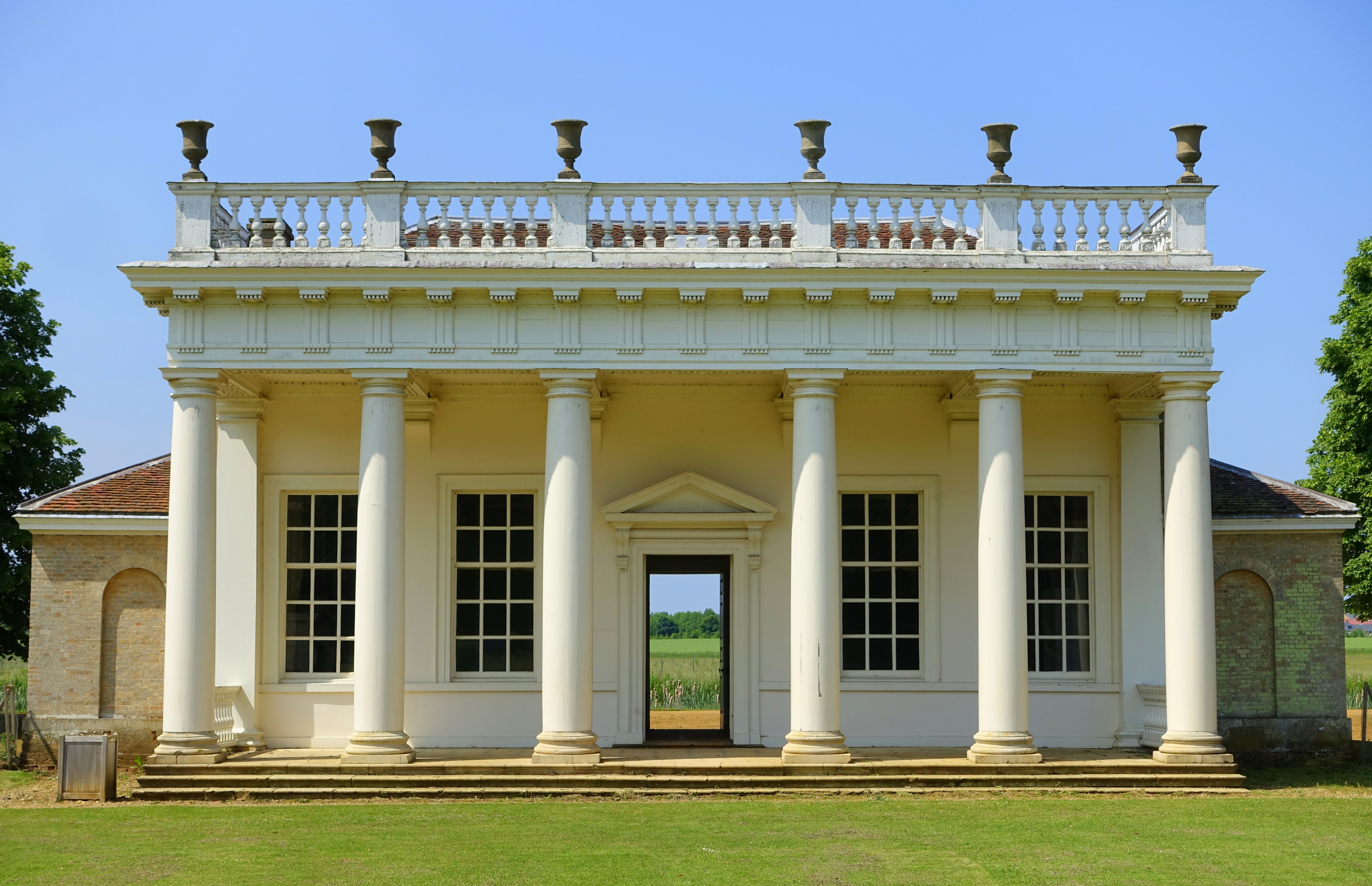
Bowling green house, exterior

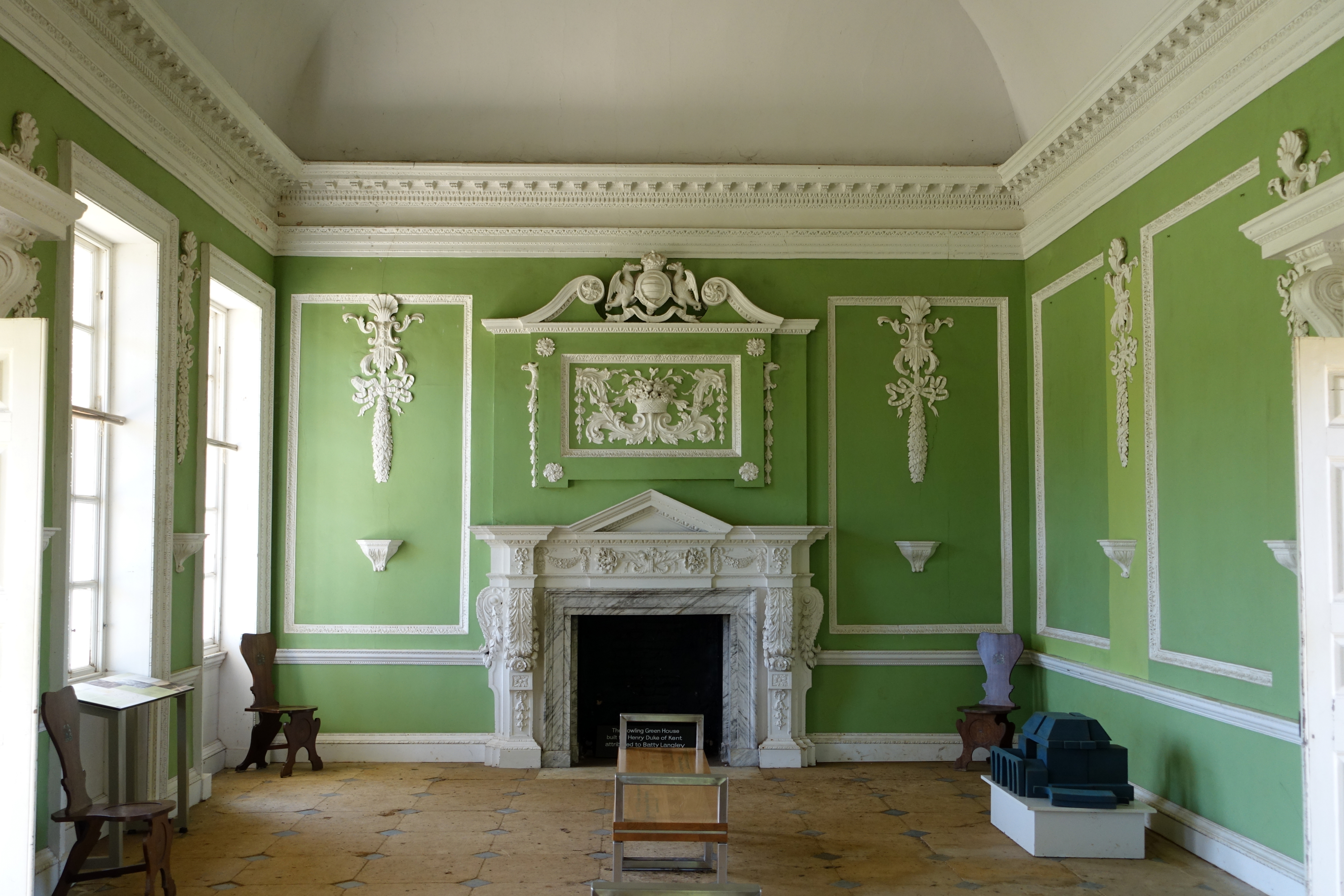
Bowling green house, interior

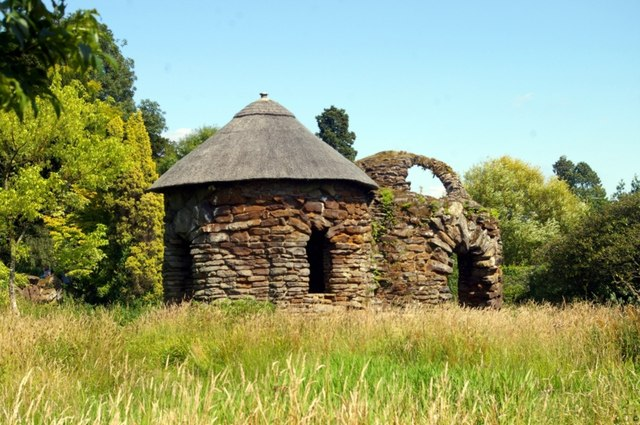
Bathhouse

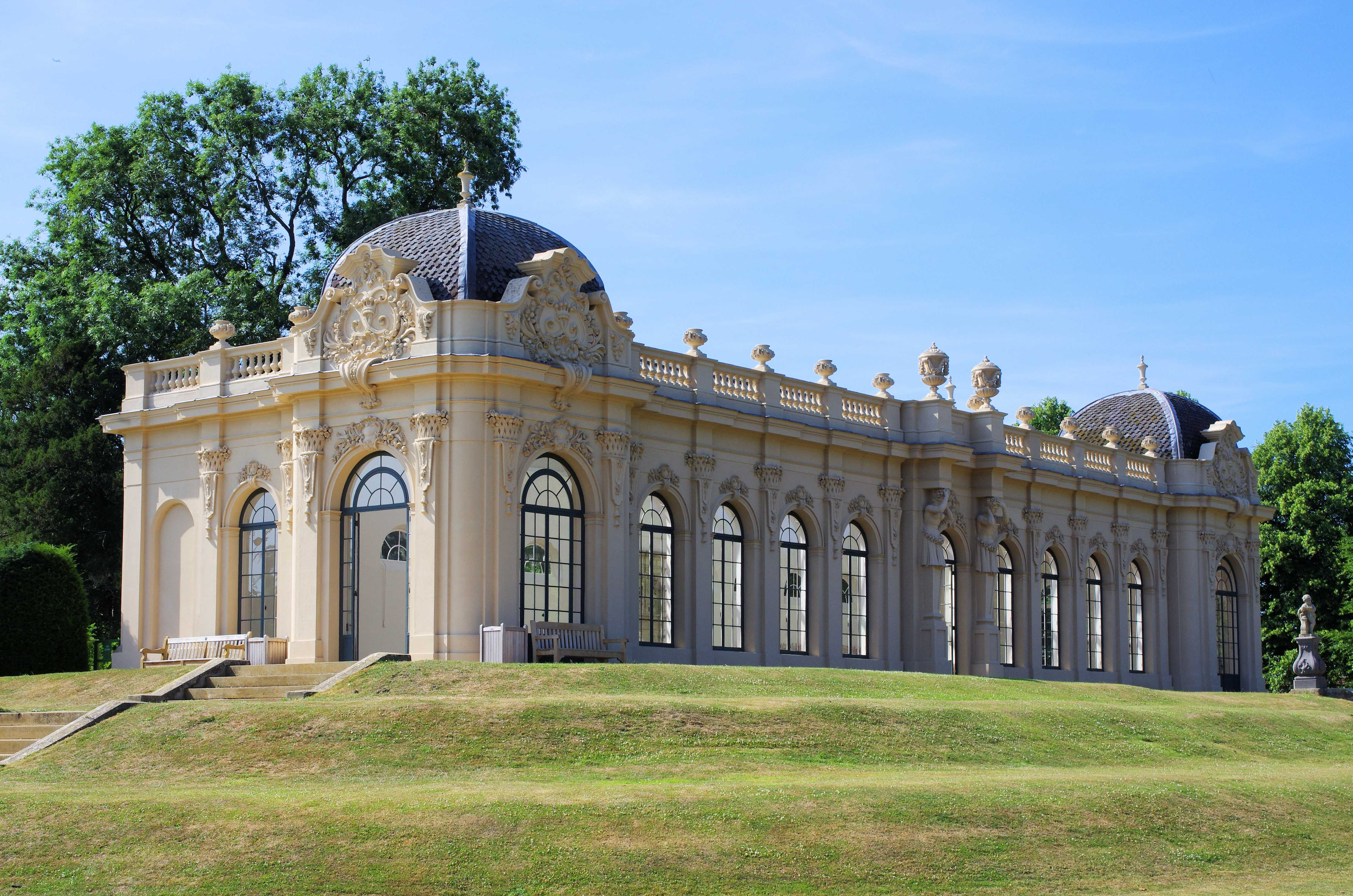
The orangery

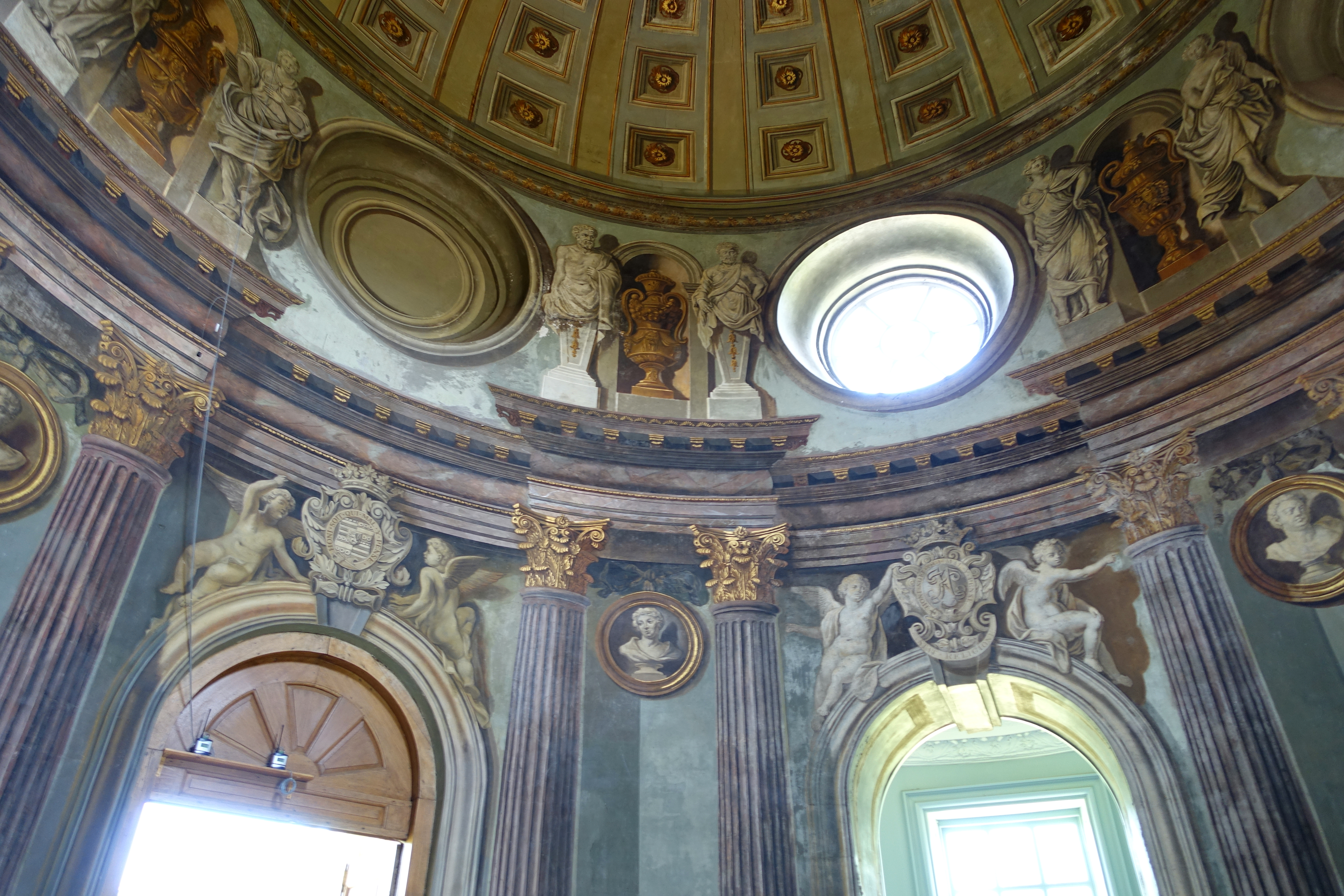
Archer Pavilion, interior

== See also ==
- De Grey Mausoleum
