= Mary, Countess of Harold =

English noble

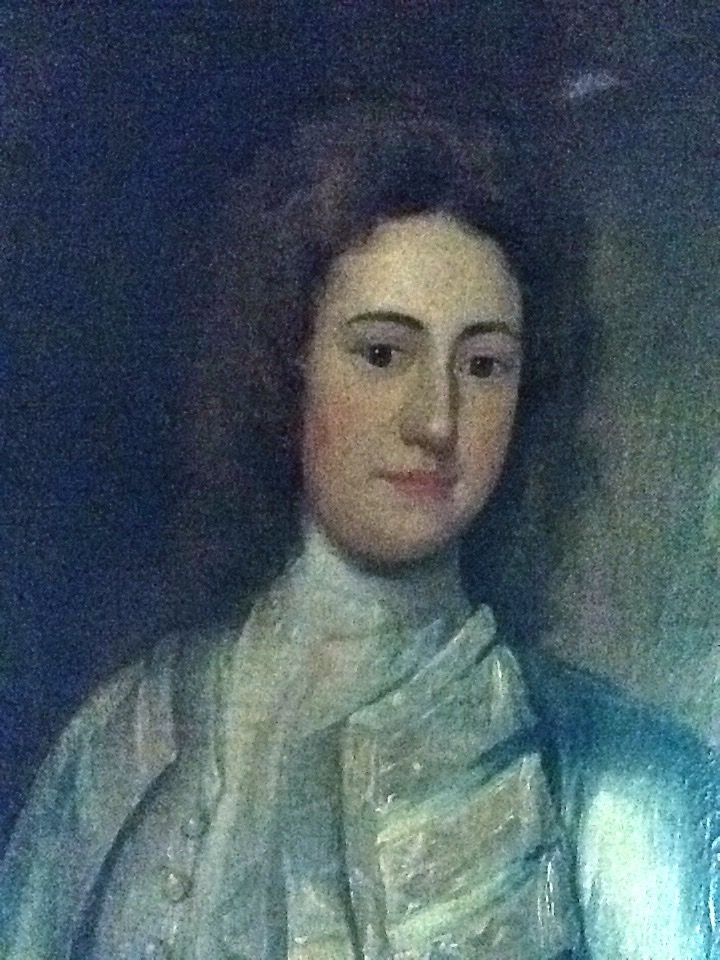
Lady Mary at age 17

Mary, Countess of Harold (née Lady Mary Tufton; 6 July 1701 – 19 February 1785) was an English aristocrat and philanthropist.

She was the eighth and youngest child of Thomas Tufton, 6th Earl of Thanet and Lady Catherine Cavendish, daughter of Henry Cavendish, 2nd Duke of Newcastle-upon-Tyne. Her father, a politician, was himself noted for his charitable giving. Her sisters included Lady Anne Tufton (d. 1757), who married James Cecil, 5th Earl of Salisbury, and Lady Margaret Tufton, who married Thomas Coke, 1st Earl of Leicester.

She was named in her father's will as an executor and administrator of the trust he established to provide for charities, including a school for poor children.

== Charity ==
Lady Mary was one of the group of aristocratic women who signed Thomas Coram's petition to King George II to establish the Foundling Hospital, a place of safety for babies and children at risk of abandonment. She signed on 6 November 1733. She joined the group in supporting an increase in systematised social welfare initiatives. In an essay which celebrates the role of women in the history of the Foundling Hospital, Elizabeth Einberg states that the women not only lent it their social cachet, but could 'highlight the Christian, virtuous and humanitarian aspects of such an endeavour', making it 'one of the most fashionable charities of the day'.

Her father's will had stipulated that, if she remarried, she would cease being an executor of his trust and charities. However, at the time of her marriage to John Leveson-Gower, 1st Earl Gower on 16 May 1736, she was the only surviving executor. She petitioned for, and was granted, letters of administration that enabled her to continue in that role. She provided financial support to other charities, including almshouses in Vauxhall for seven poor widows, which she had repaired and for which she purchased shares to provide them with an ongoing income, and a school for poor children in Brighton, Sussex (or Brighthelmston, as it was known in 1771). One hundred and forty years after her death, these charities were still known as 'the Countess of Gower's Charity'. She also provided additional income for clergy livings at several churches in Lancashire and Cumbria, for which she was remembered as "that great friend of poor livings".

== Marriages ==
Lady Mary married Anthony Grey, Earl of Harold, on 17 February 1718. Grey died at the age of 27 by choking on an ear of barley, on 21 July 1723.

At the news of her marriage to Leveson-Gower, a contemporary commented 'everybody thinks him a lucky man to get a woman of her understanding and fortune [...] but love removes great obstacles.' At the time her jointure from her first marriage was £2000, a significant fortune (equivalent to £373,000 in 2025).

By her marriage to Leveson-Gower, she had two children, the younger of whom was Rear-Admiral John Leveson-Gower. She died on 19 February 1785, at the age of 83.

== Styles ==
- Lady Mary Tufton
- Countess of Harold
- Baroness Lucas of Crudwell
- Baroness Gower of Sittenham
- Countess Gower

== Ancestry ==
Ancestors of Mary, Countess of Harold

16. Sir John Tufton, 1st Baronet
8. Nicholas Tufton, 1st Earl of Thanet
17. Christian Browne
4. John Tufton, 2nd Earl of Thanet
18. Thomas Cecil, 1st Earl of Exeter
9. Lady Frances Cecil
19. Dorothy Neville
2. Thomas Tufton, 6th Earl of Thanet
20. Robert Sackville, 2nd Earl of Dorset
10. Richard Sackville, 3rd Earl of Dorset
21. Lady Margaret Howard
5. Lady Margaret Sackville
22. George Clifford, 3rd Earl of Cumberland
11. Anne Clifford, 14th Baroness de Clifford
23. Lady Margaret Russell
1. Mary Tufton
24. Sir Charles Cavendish
12. William Cavendish, 1st Duke of Newcastle-upon-Tyne
25. Catherine Ogle, 8th Baroness Ogle
6. Henry Cavendish, 2nd Duke of Newcastle-upon-Tyne
26. William Bassett, of Blore, Staffordshire
13. Elizabeth Basset
27. Judith Austen
3. Lady Catharine Cavendish
28. Robert Pierrepont, 1st Earl of Kingston-upon-Hull
14. Hon. William Pierrepont
29. Gertrude Talbot
7. Frances Pierrepont
30. Sir Thomas Harries, 1st Baronet
15. Elizabeth Harries
31. Eleanor Gifford
