= Flitton =

Village in Bedfordshire, England

Coordinates: 52.010556°N 0.457778°W

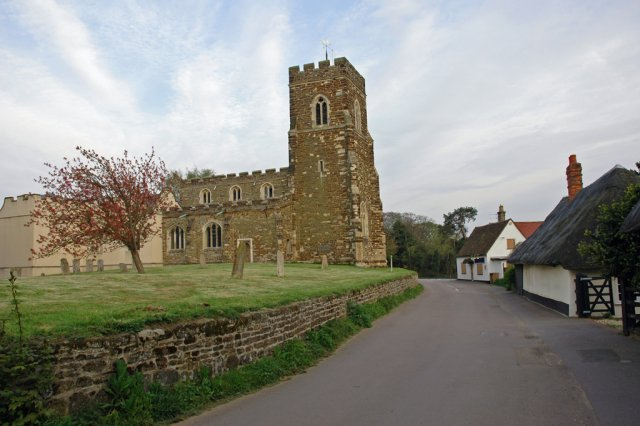

- Location within Bedfordshire
- OS grid reference: TL058363
- Civil parish: Flitton and Greenfield
- Unitary authority: Central Bedfordshire
- Ceremonial county: Bedfordshire
- Region: East
- Country: England
- Sovereign state: United Kingdom
- Post town: BEDFORD
- Postcode district: MK45
- Dialling code: 01525
- Police: Bedfordshire
- Fire: Bedfordshire
- Ambulance: East of England
- UK Parliament: Mid Bedfordshire

Flitton (Flichtam, Fllite, Flute) is a village in the civil parish of Flitton and Greenfield, in the Central Bedfordshire district of Bedfordshire, England. The village derives its name from the River Flit which flows close by it. It is notable primarily as the home of the De Grey Mausoleum adjacent to the St John the Baptist Church. Richard Milward, the editor of Selden's Table Talk, was born at Flitton in 1609. There are two pubs, The White Hart by the church hall and Jolly Coopers at Wardhedges. The annual ‘Gala’ and ‘Potato Race’ are two of the main events that happen in the village.

== History ==
Flitton was an ancient parish in the Flitt hundred of Bedfordshire. The parish historically included Silsoe, which had its own chapel of ease. Parish functions under the poor laws from the 17th century onwards were administered separately for Silsoe and the rest of Flitton parish. As such, Silsoe and Flitton became separate civil parishes in 1866 when the legal definition of 'parish' was changed to be the areas used for administering the poor laws. Silsoe became a separate ecclesiastical parish from Flitton in 1846.

The parish of Flitton was replaced in 1985 with a new parish called Flitton and Greenfield, covering a similar area to the old parish of Flitton but with some adjustments to the boundaries with the neighbouring parishes. In particular, the hamlet of Greenfield, which had historically straddled the parishes of Flitton and Pulloxhill, was brought wholly into the new Flitton and Greenfield parish. At the 1981 census (the last before the abolition of the parish), Flitton had a population of 960.

The village was struck by an F1/T2 tornado on 23 November 1981, a part of the record-breaking nationwide tornado outbreak on that day.

== Church of St John the Baptist ==
The church, which stands on a slight mound on the west side of the village, was probably built by Edmund Grey, Earl of Kent (1465), between 1440 and 1489. It has a 27-foot (8.2 m) chancel, nave 39 feet (12 m) long with aisles, south porch and west three-stage tower with a projecting rood stair turret; the whole appears to be one built in local ironstone, embattled. On the walls of the north aisle are three fragmentary brasses commemorating: Eleanor Conquest (1434), Elizabeth, wife of Thomas Waren (1544) and Alice, wife of Reginald Hill (1594).

There are six bells, (five dated 1902 and one 1904) by Bowell of Ipswich; they replaced five of 1687 by Richard Chandler of Drayton Parslow.

The natural philosopher and meteorologist George Hadley (1685–1768) is buried in the chancel.

== See also ==
- De Grey Mausoleum
- Wrest Park

== Bibliography ==
- Page, William, editor: The Victoria History of the Counties of England: Bedfordshire, University of London, Dawsons, London 1972, pp 325–332
- Pevsner, Nikolaus: The Buildings of England: Bedfordshire, Huntingdon and Peterborough, Penguin Books, London 1968, ISBN 9780140710342
