= Hundred of Stodden =

Historical division of Bedfordshire, England

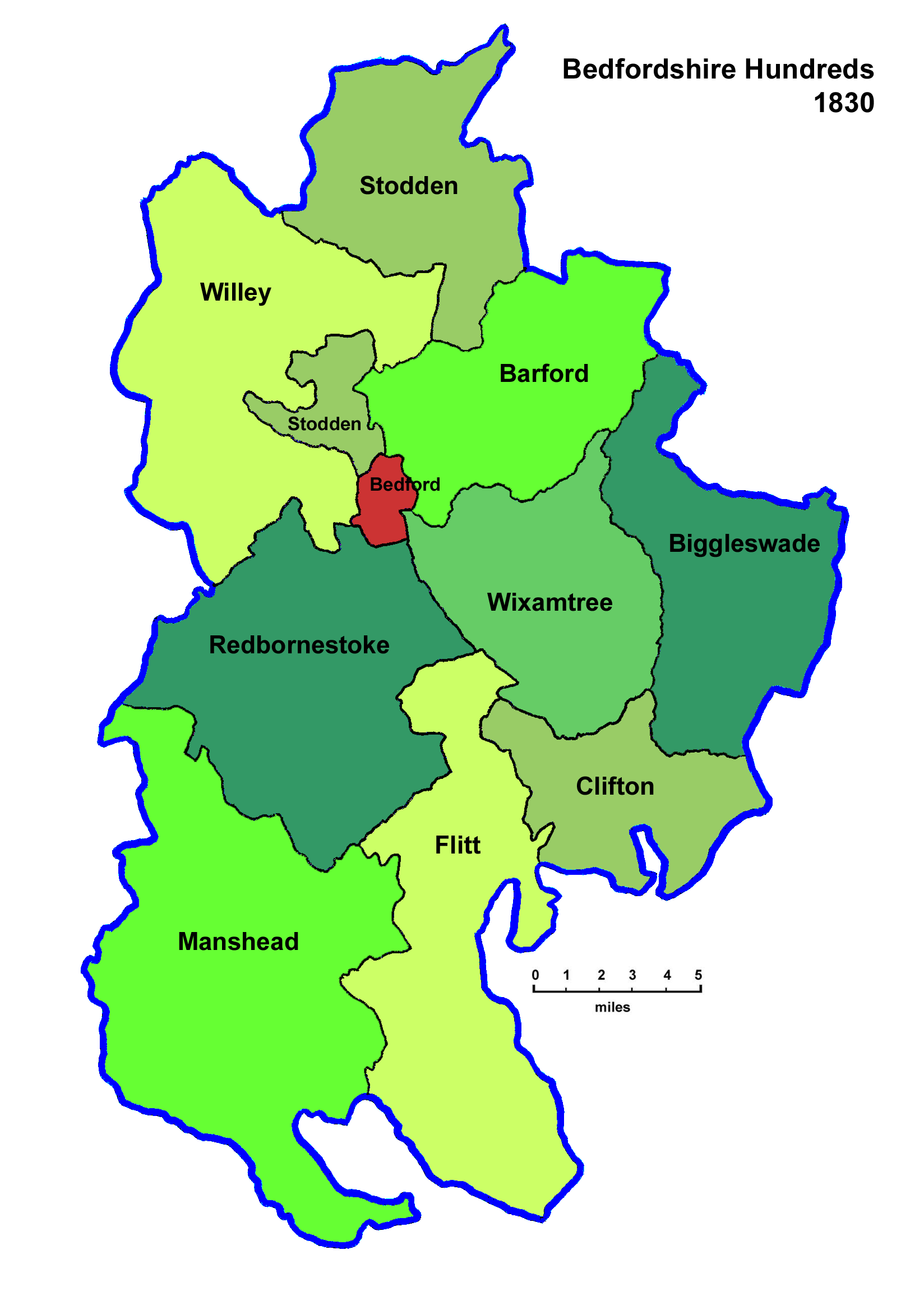
The Hundreds of Bedfordshire in 1830

The Hundred of Stodden is a historical land division, a hundred, in the north of Bedfordshire, England. It borders Northamptonshire to the north, Huntingdonshire to the east and the Bedfordshire hundreds of Willey and Barford to the south. Three vills - Oakley, Clapham and Milton Ernest - are separated from the rest of the hundred by the parishes of Beltsoe and Thurleigh, which are part of the half-hundred of Buckelow and hundred of Willey respectively.

The hundred was formed after King Edward the Elder subdued the Vikings of Bedford in 915 and constructed two burhs on each side of the River Ouse in Bedford. Willey, Barford, Stodden and the half-hundreds of Buckelow and Bedford were created to support the north Bedford burh. The separation of Oakley, Clapham and Milton Earnest is taken as evidence supporting the formation of these hundreds together as a unit of support for the same burh. Stodden consisted of 100 hides, and included the following vills:

Clapham, Melchbourne, Yielden, Dean, Bolnhurst, Milton Ernest, Riseley, Shelton, Oakley, Knotting, Tilbrook, Hanefelde (now Pertenhall), [Little] Staughton and Shirdon By 1831, the parish of Keysoe was also listed within Stodden, which was not listed as a settlement at Domesday but was within the apparent boundary of the hundred.

In 1888 the parish of Swineshead, previously a detached part of Huntingdonshire, was transferred to Stodden and Bedfordshire and Tilbrook was transferred to Huntingdonshire.

== See also ==
- Hundreds of Bedfordshire
