= Little Staughton =

Village in Bedfordshire, England

Coordinates: 52.25°N 0.3833°W

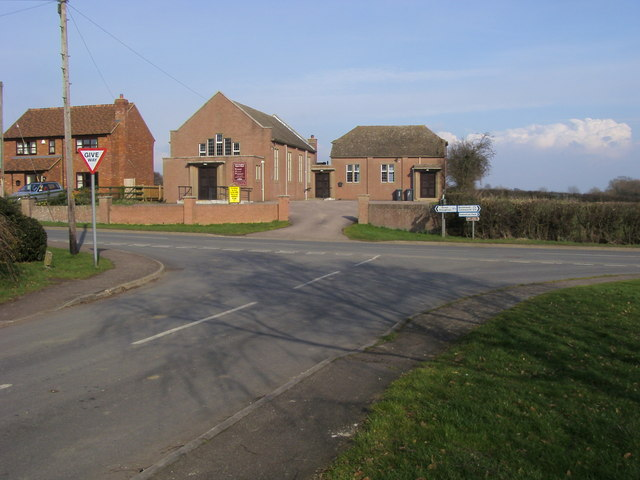
- Baptist Chapel, Little Staughton

- Location within Bedfordshire
- Population: 440 (2011 Census)
- OS grid reference: TL103516
- Unitary authority: Bedford
- Ceremonial county: Bedfordshire
- Region: East
- Country: England
- Sovereign state: United Kingdom
- Postcode district: MK44
- Dialling code: 01234
- Police: Bedfordshire
- Fire: Bedfordshire
- Ambulance: East of England
- UK Parliament: North Bedfordshire

Little Staughton is a small village and civil parish located in the north of Bedfordshire. The parish church, All Saints, is set apart from the present village – the previous village having been abandoned following an outbreak of the Bubonic plague.

== History ==
Little Staughton, known at the beginning of the 11th century as Stoctun from the old english meaning "farmstead at an outlying hamlet". It was referred to in Domesday Book simply as Staughton, although it does not refer to any taxes being collected in the area. However, by the time of the Hearth tax return in 1671, there were approximately 250 individuals living there. The population rose to a peak of 572 in 1861, then fell to 218 by 1951, during the Industrial Revolution and two World Wars

=== Church ===
The Church of All Saints, previously dedicated to St Margaret's, originally had a spire that was destroyed by lightning. The building has been Grade I listed since 1964.

=== RAF Little Staughton ===
During World War II it was the home of 109 Squadron (Mosquito bombers) and 582 Squadron (Lancaster bombers) at RAF Little Staughton. The airfield is now largely used for other purposes but retains a recently listed Control tower. In January 2020, Little Staughton Airfield and Industrial Park applied for planning permission to develop the site to re-open the airfield.

== Geography ==
Little Staughton is a village in Bedfordshire, in the Borough of Bedford, 4.5 miles (7.2 km) south east of Kimbolton, Cambridgeshire The parish is part of the Stodden Hundred (which comprises Bolnhurst, Clapham, Dean and Shelton, Keysoe, Knotting, Little Staughton, Melchbourne, Milton Ernest, Oakley, Pertenhall & Swineshead, Riseley, Shelton, Tilbrook and Yelden).

The village sits on Oxford Clay and is located away from the parish Church of All Saints, it is possible that the villagers moved away from the church due to victims of an outbreak of black death in 1349 where 1 in 3 members of the local population were killed and likely buried in the church graveyard. An alternative theory is that the village moved to follow the local road network.

== See also ==
- Great Staughton, located close by in Huntingdonshire
