= Pertenhall =

Village in Bedfordshire, England

Coordinates: 52.2666°N 0.4166°W

- Village sign erected to commemorate Festival of Britain in 1951

- Location within Bedfordshire
- Population: 207 (2011 Census)
- OS grid reference: TL080356
- Unitary authority: Bedford
- Ceremonial county: Bedfordshire
- Region: East
- Country: England
- Sovereign state: United Kingdom
- Post town: BEDFORD
- Postcode district: MK44
- Dialling code: 01480
- Police: Bedfordshire
- Fire: Bedfordshire
- Ambulance: East of England
- UK Parliament: North Bedfordshire

Pertenhall is a small village and civil parish located in Bedfordshire, close to the borders of Cambridgeshire and Northamptonshire.

The name derives from Peters Hill (allegedly) based on the Hill by St Peter's Church. The village is part of the parish of Pertenhall & Swineshead and is within Stodden Hundred (which comprises Bolnhurst, Clapham, Dean and Shelton, Keysoe, Knotting, Little Staughton, Melchbourne, Milton Ernest, Oakley, Pertenhall, Riseley, Shelton, Tilbrook and Yelden).

The village is drawn out along the B660 beginning with Chapel Yard, derived from the Moravian Chapel located there and is characterised by a series of 'Ends', namely Wood End (a cul-de-sac, terminating at a footpath known locally as 'the Track', Chadwell End (a thoroughfare), derived from the Chad Well that exists nearby and leading to Green End at the south.

== World War II ==
During the war the village had a propaganda school for the Special Operations Executive (SOE).

== Moravian Chapel ==
Inscription on gate at entrance to Moravian Chapel Graveyard

Little remains of the chapel itself but there are still gravestones in the graveyard.

== St Peter's Church ==
St Peters Church, Pertenhall

The village's oldest building is the church, which dates from Norman times. There are also a number of interesting buildings such as the Manor House, Hoo Farm and Green End Farm House, all of which date back several hundred years.

== Village Hall ==
Pertenhall Village Hall, previously the village school

Inscription above Village Hall entrance - "Christo in Parvulis" meaning "For Christ in the dear little children"

Plaque commemorating the Reverend Martyn's donation

The Village Hall was formerly the Village School which was in use from 1870 to 1946. The school was built on a site bequeathed by the Reverend John King Martyn M.A. and a plaque in the hall commemorates this. John King Martyn was the grandson of the botanist John Martyn.

== Education ==
The primary school within catchment of Pertenhall is located in the village of Riseley, four miles away from Pertenhall, and is called Riseley Primary School. The secondary school within catchment of Pertenhall is in the village of Sharnbrook, eight miles away from Pertenhall, and is called Sharnbrook Academy.
