= Listed buildings in Bolnhurst and Keysoe =

Bolnhurst and Keysoe is a civil parish in Bedford, Bedfordshire, England. It contains 51 listed buildings that are recorded in the National Heritage List for England. Of these, one is listed at Grade I, the highest of the three grades, one is listed at Grade II*, the middle grade and, the others are at Grade II, the lowest grade. The parish consists of the villages of Bolnhurst and Keysoe, along with the hamlet of Keysoe Row.

== Key ==
Grade	Criteria
I	Buildings of exceptional interest, sometimes considered to be internationally important
II*	Particularly important buildings of more than special interest
II	Buildings of national importance and special interest

== Buildings ==
Name and location	Photograph	Date	Notes	Grade
Mavourn Farmhouse; 52.20604°N 0.43305°W	—	17th century	The farmhouse was constructed in the 17th century from a timber frame, some brick casing, some rough cast, and the whole thing colour washed. 19th century tiled roof.	II
Church St Dunsten; 52.21583°N 0.41950°W		13th century	Parish church originating in the 13th century, 14th and 15th century details. Constructed from coursed limestone rubble with ashlar dressings.	II*
Church of St Mary the Virgin; 52.25012°N 0.42834°W		Late 12th century	Parish church originating in the late 12th century, constructed from coursed limestone rubble with ashlar dressings.	I
College Farmhouse; 52.24169°N 0.43332°W	—	16th to 17th century	House has additions from a later date. Timber frame, with some coursed rubble, some brick and some rough cast casing, the whole colour washed. Clay tile roof.	II
Kylemore Cottage; 52.24927°N 0.44625°W	—	16th century	16th century cottage with later additions. Timber framed with some plaster infill, some brick casing, some rough case, the whole colour washed except for some exposed timbering to north-east wing. Thatched roof.	II
Synehurst; 52.22902°N 0.40764°W	—	Late 18th century	Late 18th century cottage, cob construction, rough cast and colour washed. Thatched roof with red brick stacks to both gable ends.	II
Rose Cottage; 52.22551°N 0.41048°W	—	17th century	17th century cottage, colour washed rough cast over a timber frame, with a thatched roof and red brick stacks.	II
Ye Olde Plough Public House; 52.21548°N 0.40965°W		17th century	17th century public house, colour washed rough cast over timber frame, and an old clay tile roof. One storey and an attic.	II
The Hedges; 52.21356°N 0.40947°W	—	18th century	18th century cottage, colour washed rough cast over a timber frame. Thatched roof over one storey and an attic.	II
Cottage opposite Church Road; 52.25190°N 0.42454°W		Late 17th century	Late 17th century cottage, timber framed (south-west gable end refaced with brick in the 19th century), whole building rough cast and colour washed. Thatched roof over one storey and an attic.	II
Mill Hill Cottage; 52.25256°N 0.42497°W	—	18th century	18th century cottage, timber framed with colour washed brick infill. Thatched roof covering one storey and attics.	II
Old Brook House; 52.25670°N 0.42484°W	—	17th century	17th century house, timber framed with brick and colour washed plaster infill. Old clay tile roof, rows immediately below the ridge being fish-scale tiles.	II
Lavender Cottage; 52.25832°N 0.42320°W	—	c1700	c1700 cottage, Colour washed rough cast over timber frame. Thatched roof over one storey and an attic.	II
Barn to rear of manor, belonging to the grange 52.26090°N 0.42231°W	—	18th century	18th century timber framed barn, encased in a 19th-century red brick casing. Half-hipped old clay tile roof.	II
Corner House; 52.25606°N 0.42542°W	—	18th century	18th century cottage, constructed from a colour washed rough cast over a timber frame. Some timber frame has been exposed on the north-west elevation. 2 rooms on one story, with an attic above. 20th century additions include exterior doors and a porch.	II
Former Baptist Chapel; 52.25564°N 0.42877°W		Mid-18th century	Mid-18th century baptist chapel, with an attached late 20th century garage and conservatory. Square in shape, the building has a hipped roof, and a central front door under a late 20th century portico, being supported by 2 columns. All windows except for the far left, is a late 20th century replacement.	II
Cottage approx 250 metres south west of the elms 52.25386°N 0.43409°W		18th century	18th century cottage, constructed from a timber frame covered in pebble-dash, with a red brick south-west gable end, and a thatched roof. The building has a 2-room plan over 2 storeys, and a one-storey extension to both the rear and north-east gable end.	II
Baptist Free Church; 52.23854°N 0.43125°W		Late 18th century	Late 18th century barn, converted to a chapel in the early 19th century. Constructed from a timber frame rendered and colour washed on the East elevation; other elevations were encased in yellow brick in the latter half of the 19th century. Roof is half-hitched and thatched.	II
Willow Cottage; 52.23935°N 0.41123°W		18th century	18th century cottage, constructed from cob covered in rough cast and colour washed. Gable end stacks constructed from red brick, with a lean to on the north-east gable end. 2 room plan on one storey, topped by an attic and a thatched roof. 20th century additions include central porch, 2 further porches, and a normer of casements.	II
Elm Tree Farmhouse; 52.23771°N 0.41889°W	—	c1600	Farmhouse dated circa 1600, constructed from a colour washed brick and rough cast facing to a timber frame, with red brick ridge stacks to both blocks. T-plan, 2 storeyed cross-wing, main block one storey and attics, under an old clay tile roof.	II
Corner Cottage; 52.24003°N 0.43445°W	—	18th century	18th century cottage, consisting of a cob construction face on colour washed brick, with a red brick external gable end stack on the west elevation. One storey with two rooms, under an attic and thatched roof. One storey extension on the west gable end.	II
Turnpike Farmhouse; 52.22581°N 0.40991°W	—	c1700	Farmhouse from circa 1700, of a timber frame covered in colour washed rough cast. 2 storeys under a slate roof. 2 storey, red brick addition to the west elevation, and a one-storey pantiled extension on the east gable end.	II
Glebe Cottage; 52.25146°N 0.42485°W	—	c1700	Cottage dated circa 1700, consisting of colour washed rough cast over timber frame, a red brick external stack to the east gable end, and a thatched roof. Single storey extension to the west gable end, consisting of colour washed rough cast under an asbestos tile roof. Further one storey lean to extension on the south elevation.	II
Barns bordering road, Brook End Farm; 52.25622°N 0.42597°W	—	18th and 19th centuries	4 barns dating from the 18th and 19th centuries. Large barn dated 18th century, of weather boarding over a timber frame, on a brick plinth with a pantiled roof. Three smaller barns being: 19th century single-bay brick block with old clay tile roof; 18th century timber framed block, with a corrugated iron roof; and a 19th-century L-plan block of brick with old clay tile roof.	II
Sunday School, belonging with Baptist Chapel; 52.25580°N 0.42849°W	—	19th century	19th century Sunday school for the attached Baptist church, that is now converted to a private dwelling. Constructed from gault brick, and a roof of some slate and some later 20th century tile. Layout of the building is a single storey hall flanked by recessed wings that have a lower roof line.	II
Meeting Cottage; 52.25581°N 0.42903°W	—	18th century	18th century cottage, colour washed rough cast over timber frame, with a red brick gable end, and an integral stack on the west elevation. Thatched roof over 2 bays of 2 storeys with one bay of one storey and attics to the east side.	II
Southview Cottage; 52.23888°N 0.41236°W	—	18th century	18th century cottage, of ob construction with rough cast and colour wash, west gable end rendered. Thatched roof over 3 bays, one storey and an attic.	II
Homestead; 52.24290°N 0.40545°W	—	18th century	18th century cottage, formerly two separate cottages. Constructed from a colour washed rough cast over a timber frame, with a thatched roof over one storey and an attic. Both a red brick ridge stack and external stack on the south-west gable end. Weatherboarded and pantiled extensions of one storey on both gable ends.	II
Oxford Farmhouse; 52.24351°N 0.40384°W	—	17th century	17th century farmhouse, of rough cast over timber frame. Old clay tile roof over a 2-storey T-plan layout. Lean-to one storey extensions to both the north gable end and the rear.	II
Rose Cottage; 52.23770°N 0.41718°W	—	18th century	18th century cottage, of colour washed rough cast over a timber frame, and a thatched roof over a 2-room, 2 storey plan. Both gable ends have a colour washed rough cast external stack.	II
Glen Cottage Wayside; 52.23774°N 0.42393°W		c1700	17th century pair of cottages. Glen cottage consisting of colour washed rough cast over timber frame; Wayside consisting of timber frame with colour washed plaster infill. Red brick double ridge stack at divide, and a thatched roof over one storey.	II
Kynance Cottage; 52.23907°N 0.43785°W	—	18th century	18th century cottage, of cob construction with rough cast and colour wash. Thatched roof over a 2-room one storey plan and attic. Red brick stack on both the east gable end and the ridge to the west. Building has been extended slightly at the west gable end.	II
Little Farmhouse; 52.22551°N 0.40689°W	—	17th century	17th century farmhouse, of colour wash rough cast and brick over a timber frame. Thatched roof over a one-storey L-plan and attic.	II
Elm Farmhouse; 52.22947°N 0.39419°W	—	c1700	Farmhouse dated circa 1700, of colour washed rough cast over a timber frame, and a corrugated iron roof over two storeys. Red brick external stacks to both gable ends and one red brick ridge stack. Lean-to extension of one storey on the south (rear) elevation.	II
Wybridge Cottage; 52.24815°N 0.42148°W	—	18th century	18th century cottage, constructed from colour washed rough cast over a timber frame. Thatched roof over a 2-room, 2 storey plan. Red brick integral gable end stack on the south side where it adjoins the next house.	II
Village School Room; 52.25185°N 0.42450°W		1840	School dated 1840. Consists of a Flemish bond orange colour bricks construct, with a Welsh slate roof above. (Right building in image)	II
Chapel House; 52.23860°N 0.41348°W	—	17th century	17th century cottage, that was refronted in the 20th century. Consists of chequered brick facing over a timber frame. Half-hipped thatched roof over one storey and an attic. Red brick ridge stack in centre of roof.	II
The Manor; 52.26077°N 0.42170°W	—	16th century or earlier	16th century or earlier house, of colour washed rough cast over a timber frame, with a clay tile roof. T-plan, with one storey and attics to cross-wing, and 2 storeys to main block. 19th century addition to the rear, consisting of colour washed brick under a slate roof.	II
The White Horse Public House; 52.23766°N 0.41480°W	—	17th century	17th and 18th century public house. 17th century, west, part consists of colour washed rough cast over a timber frame with a thatched roof; 18th century, east, part consists of colour washed brick with a tiled roof. One red brick stack at each gable end and one at the divide. 20th century extension to the rear of the building.	II
Barn south west of Baptist Church; 52.23846°N 0.41343°W	—	Late 18th century	Late 18th century barn, of weather boarding over a timber frame, and a pantiled roof above.	II
Row Farmhouse; 52.24211°N 0.40589°W	—	17th century	17th century farmhouse, of colour washed rough cast over a timber frame, with a brick faced gable end on the south west elevation. Thatched roof, over 2 storeys and an attic. Red brick triple ridge stack at the divide. Later additions to north-east gable end, consists of one storey and attics and a further one storey, constructed from colour wash with pantile roofs.	II
Wych Tree Farmhouse; 52.23747°N 0.41613°W	—	17th century	17th century farmhouse, of a timber framed faced with pebble-dash, under a clay tile roof. Red brick external gable end stack at the east, and one red brick ridge stack.	II
Summer Song; 52.23714°N 0.42935°W	—	18th century	18th century cottage, consisting of colour washed rough cast over cob construction. Thatched roof over a 2-room, 2 storey plan. Red brick gable end stacks on both the west (external) and east (integral) elevations.	II
Manor Farmhouse; 52.22657°N 0.41253°W	—	17th century	17th century farmhouse, that has been refronted in the 19th century. Constructed from timber frame covered with rough cast and colour washed, parts rebuilt in brick during the 20th century. Hipped slate roof, over a 2-storey T-plan. 2 external stacks at the north elevation. One storey lean-to extension and conservatory at the west elevation.	II
Blacklands Farmhouse; 52.20096°N 0.42012°W	—	17th century	17th century farmhouse, of colour washed rough cast over a timber frame. 20th century tile roof over a 3-room, 2 storey plan. One storey and attics extension, consisting of colour washed brick to rear.	II
Bier House; 52.24981°N 0.42782°W		Mid-19th century	Mid-19th century, constructed of red brick and a pantiled roof. Brick coping to the gable ends.	II
Temple Farmhouse; 52.24992°N 0.41781°W	—	17th century	17th century farm cottage, constructed from rough cast over timber frame, some of which has later been replaced by chequered brick. Half-hipped thatched roof over a 3-room, one storey and attic plan. Red brick double ridge stack. 19th century, one storey brick and pantiled roof extension at the rear elevation.	II
The Little Pyghtle; 52.25769°N 0.42370°W	—	18th century	18th century cottage, of timber frame with colour washed plaster infill. Red brick ridge stack, and one storey extension at the rear elevation.	II
Cottage approximately 50 metres north of Lavender Cottage; 52.25887°N 0.42303°W	—	17th century	17th century cottage, of colour washed rough cast over a timber frame. Thatched roof over one storey and attics. Off-centre double red brick ridge stack Lean-to extension at the north gable end.	II
Brook End Farmhouse; 52.25616°N 0.42639°W	—	17th century	17th century farmhouse, consisting of a timber framed, some with rough cast, some with brick infill, with the whole thing colour washed. Clay tile roof over the main block (2 storeys and attics) and rear wing (one storey and attics). One red brick ridge stack, and one gable end external stack at the south west gable end. Single-storeyed lean-to extensions at both gable ends.	II
The Elms; 52.25499°N 0.43114°W	—	c1700	Cottage dated circa 1700, consisting of a timber frame with part colour washed plaster infill and part colour washed rough cast. Thatched roof over one storey and attics. Three stacks– one red brick ridge stack, one red brick integral stack at the south-west gable end, and one external stack at the south-east elevation. 20th century extension at a right angle to the north elevation.	II
