= Souldrop =

Village in Bedfordshire, England

Coordinates: 52.2333°N 0.55°W

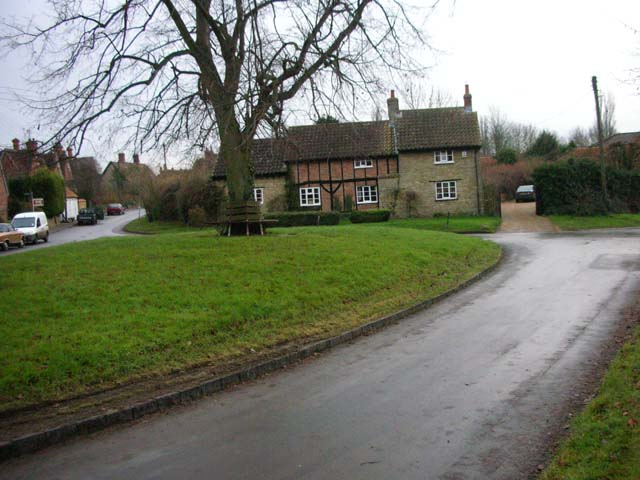
- The Green, Souldrop

- Location within Bedfordshire
- OS grid reference: SP990126
- Civil parish: Knotting and Souldrop
- Unitary authority: Bedford
- Ceremonial county: Bedfordshire
- Region: East
- Country: England
- Sovereign state: United Kingdom
- Post town: BEDFORD
- Postcode district: MK44
- Dialling code: 01234
- Police: Bedfordshire
- Fire: Bedfordshire
- Ambulance: East of England
- UK Parliament: North Bedfordshire

Souldrop is a village in the civil parish of Knotting and Souldrop, in the Bedford borough of Bedfordshire, England, located near the border with Northamptonshire. Nearby places include Sharnbrook, Podington, Odell, Melchbourne, Yelden, Knotting, and Newton Bromswold and Rushden over the border in Northamptonshire.

Sharnbrook Summit nature reserve is located near the village.

Souldrop was an ancient parish in the Willey hundred of Bedfordshire. In 1931 the parish was merged with the neighbouring parish of Knotting to form a new civil parish called Knotting and Souldrop. At the 1931 census (the last before the abolition of the parish), Souldrop had a population of 161.

== Notable people ==
- H. C. Asterley, novelist
