= Swineshead =

Swineshead may refer to:

- Richard Swineshead (fl. c. 1340–1354), English mathematician, logician and natural philosopher
- Swineshead, Bedfordshire (historically in Huntingdonshire), a civil parish
  - Church of St Nicholas, Swineshead, Bedfordshire
  - Swineshead Wood, a Site of Special Scientific Interest near Swineshead, Bedfordshire
- Swineshead, Lincolnshire, a village and civil parish
  - Swineshead Abbey, a former religious establishment near Swineshead, Lincolnshire
  - Swineshead railway station, serving Swineshead, Lincolnshire
