= William Hull (artist) =

English artist (1820–1880)

- Born: 6 May 1820; Grafham, Huntingdonshire, England, United Kingdom
- Died: 15 March 1880 (aged 59); Rydal, Westmorland (present day Cumbria, England, United Kingdom)
- Occupations: painter, illustrator
- Relatives: Edward Hull (brother)

William Hull (6 May 1820 – 15 March 1880) was an English watercolour landscape and still-life painter, illustrator and etcher, who exhibited at the Royal Academy in London. He was the brother of Edward Hull, another well known illustrator and painter.

== Life and work ==
Hull was born at Grafham in Huntingdonshire, the son of a small farmer who moved soon after his son's birth to Keysoe, Bedfordshire, and then to the nearby village of Pertenhall. There, in the village school, William received his early education; afterwards he went for three years to Ockbrook, near Derby, to be educated as a minister at the Moravian Settlement there, where he had a few lessons in drawing from two Germans named Petersen and Hassé. After spending a year at the settlement at Wellhouse, near Mirfield in Yorkshire, as student and assistant, he went in 1838 to the Moravian establishment at Grace Hill, near Ballymena in Ireland, where he made many sketches. He spent five weeks in London in 1840, studying the works of art in the British Museum.

Acknowledging that he did not have a vocation for the ministry, Hull gave up his position at Grace Hill and moved to Manchester with his family and where his father was to be a missionary. He became a clerk in the printing and lithographic works of Bradshaw and Blacklock and studied at the school of design there for a short time. From 1841 to 1844 he travelled in France, Germany, and the Low Countries as tutor to the two sons of a Mr Janvrin, a merchant of St Helier in Jersey, and took every opportunity of continuing his study of art.

Hull returned to Manchester in 1844, and on 7 July 1847 married Mary Elizabeth Newling, the daughter of Joshua Newling, a draper. Three years later he was partially paralysed by a stroke which also left him deaf, and then, in 1861, his wife died while they were staying in Wales. Childless and lame, Hull was regarded by his friends as a "somewhat lonely but genial-minded man".

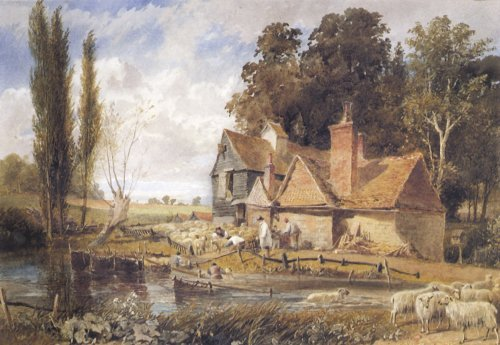
Sheep washing – Enton Mill, Surrey (watercolour)

From 1844, when he contributed two pictures to the exhibition at the Royal Manchester Institution, Hull devoted himself entirely to painting and sketching. During his career he produced careful watercolours of objects of interest and rural beauty in almost every county in England. His works in black and white and sepia were highly regarded by his contemporaries for their skill, although John Ruskin advised him to introduce more colour; later he also produced detailed fruit and flower paintings.

Prince Albert acquired a couple of Hull's watercolours on a visit to Manchester in 1857. Some of his best work was in black and white, and sepia, such as his views of Oxford and Cambridge, and illustrations to the volumes "Charles Dickens and Rochester" and "The childhood and youth of Charles Dickens" (both engraved by his friend Robert Langton, the author). Langton said of Hull in the latter book: "It is most probable, I think, that had Charles Dickens lived to complete Edwin Drood, some of the views of Cloisterham given here would have been engraved as illustrations to the story." Hull also drew some of the illustrations to John Parsons Earwaker's East Cheshire, Past and Present (1877–1881), and his drawings of the mill at Ambleside and Wythburn Church were reproduced in autotype.

He etched several plates, some of which appeared as illustrations to books, and he contributed an article on taste to Bradshaw's Magazine in 1842–43. After his death, reproductions of his drawings were published, with extracts from his letters, in The Portfolio (an art periodical) in 1886 and 1887. These notes expressed his delight in the landscape of the Lake District, which he first saw in 1854, and which he described to his associates in the Letherbrow Club, a private literary and artistic society in Manchester which he had joined in 1848. In 1870 he moved permanently to the Lake District. In The Portfolio of 1886 Thomas Letherbrow described his friend's affection for this dramatic landscape, which he linked to the artist's admiration for William Wordsworth.

From 1858 to 1877, Hull exhibited 8 works at the Royal Academy and, from 1867 to 1874, three paintings at the Suffolk Street gallery in London. Despite his residence in the Lake District, Hull continued to contribute works to the Manchester Academy of Fine Arts, and also took some part in its management; he exhibited there regularly and studied in its life class. He exhibited at the regular exhibitions of the Royal Manchester Institution and at the black and white exhibitions held there from 1877 to 1880.

William Hull died at Rydal, Westmorland (now in Cumbria) on 15 March 1880, and was buried in the churchyard at Grasmere.

His brother Edward Hull (1823–1906) was also a noted watercolorist and wood-engraver.
