= Upper Dean =

Village in Bedfordshire, England

Coordinates: 52.29777°N 0.46726°W

- Location within Bedfordshire
- OS grid reference: TL046677
- Civil parish: Dean and Shelton
- Unitary authority: Bedford
- Ceremonial county: Bedfordshire
- Region: East
- Country: England
- Sovereign state: United Kingdom
- Post town: HUNTINGDON
- Postcode district: PE28
- Dialling code: 01234
- Police: Bedfordshire
- Fire: Bedfordshire
- Ambulance: East of England
- UK Parliament: North Bedfordshire

Upper Dean is a village located in the Borough of Bedford in Bedfordshire, England.

== Description ==
The village forms part of the Dean and Shelton civil parish, and is close to the settlements of Melchbourne and Swineshead. Upper Dean is the location of All Saints Church, which has been a Grade I listed building since 1964. It dates mainly from the 15th century and "escaped" Victorian restoration.

Eileen Wade Primary School, which opened in 1877 and moved to new premises in 1973, has 70 pupils. It is federated with nearby Milton Ernest Primary School. It received a positive assessment after an Ofsted inspection in December 2025.

== Famous person ==
The scholar and Bible translator Francis Dillingham (died 1625) was born here, perhaps in the early 1570s.
