= Knotting =

Knotting may refer to:

- tying a knot
- Knotting, Bedfordshire, a village in England
- Copulatory tie, an aspect of canine reproduction
  - Knotting, a trope in Omegaverse erotic fiction, derived from the copulatory tie
