= Knotting Green =

Village in Bedfordshire, England

Coordinates: 52.25429°N 0.53026°W

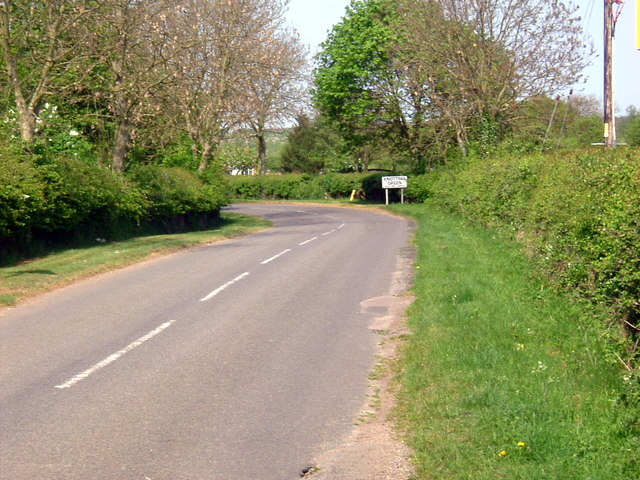
- Entrance into Knotting Green

- Location within Bedfordshire
- OS grid reference: TL004628
- Civil parish: Knotting and Souldrop
- Unitary authority: Bedford
- Ceremonial county: Bedfordshire
- Region: East
- Country: England
- Sovereign state: United Kingdom
- Post town: BEDFORD
- Postcode district: MK44
- Dialling code: 01234
- Police: Bedfordshire
- Fire: Bedfordshire
- Ambulance: East of England
- UK Parliament: North Bedfordshire

Knotting Green is a hamlet located in the Borough of Bedford of Bedfordshire, England. It is in the civil parish of Knotting and Souldrop.

The settlement is close to Knotting, Souldrop and Riseley. The nearest town to Knotting Green is Rushden in Northamptonshire. The hamlet consists of several farms, a few cottages and a Wesleyan chapel. The chapel was registered 1889 by the Wesleyan minister Arthur James Pickworth.

Knotting Green Farm is a 16th to 17th century building that was extended in the 19th century designated as Grade II and of special interest in 1952. It was originally part of the Manor of Knotting and was owned by the Duke of Bedford until 1882.

Strawberry Hill at Knotting Green was a farm until the 1990s when the 150-hectare of land was left to rewild. In 2022 the Wildlife Trust for Bedfordshire, Cambridgeshire and Northamptonshire leased the reserve and after raising £1million purchased the southern half. In June 2024 the charity started raising money to purchase the rest of the site to save the unique habitat in an area dominated by agriculture, and announced in November that the area had been successfully purchased. The farmhouse was built by Francis Russell the Duke of Bedford in 1868 and was listed as Grade II and of special interest in 1987.
