= Newton Bromswold =

Village in Northamptonshire, England

Coordinates: 52.2787°N 0.5430°W

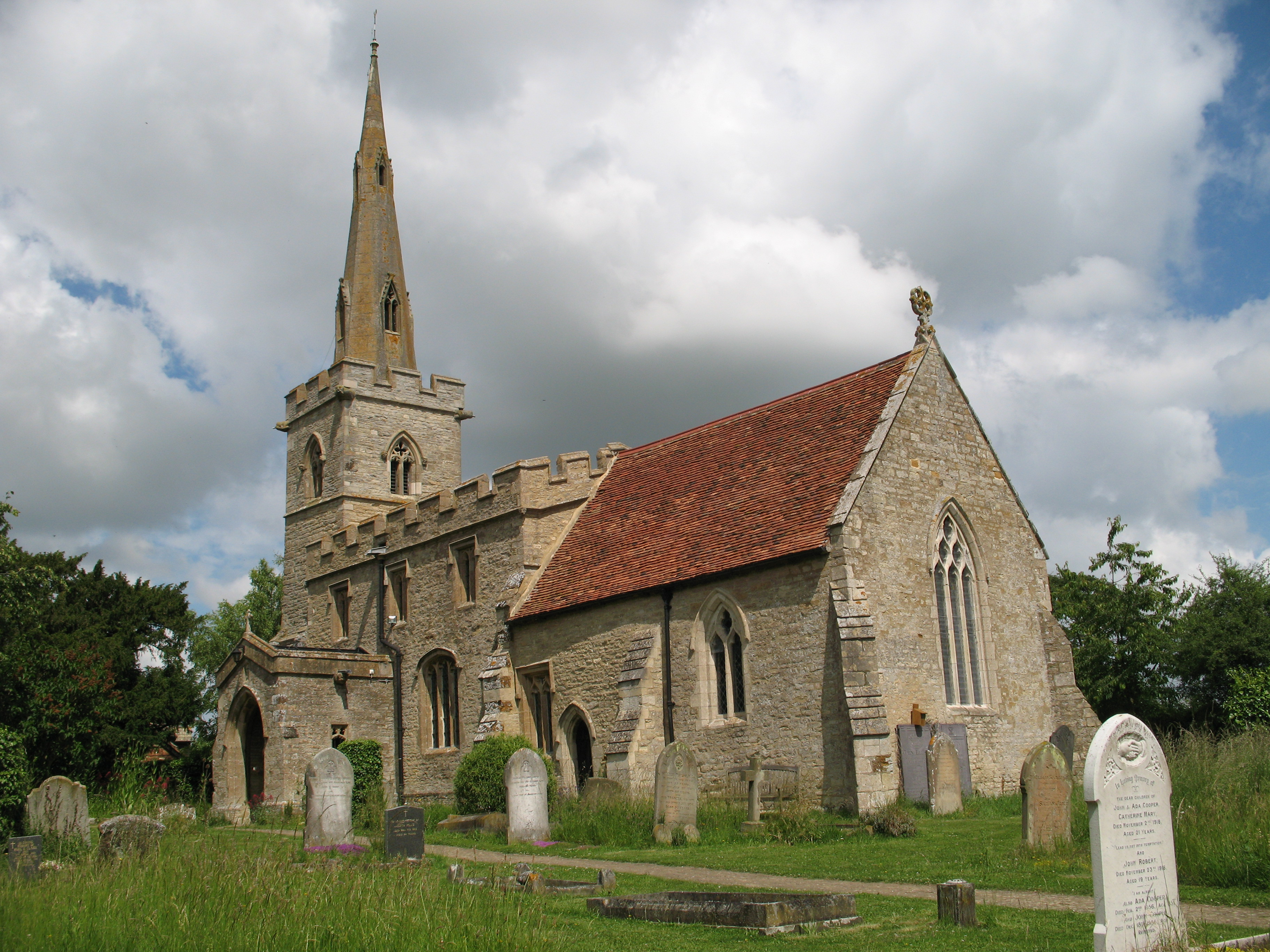
- St Peter's Church

- Location within Northamptonshire
- Population: 62 (2001)
- OS grid reference: SP9965
- Unitary authority: North Northamptonshire
- Ceremonial county: Northamptonshire
- Region: East Midlands
- Country: England
- Sovereign state: United Kingdom
- Post town: Rushden
- Postcode district: NN10
- Dialling code: 01933
- Police: Northamptonshire
- Fire: Northamptonshire
- Ambulance: East Midlands
- UK Parliament: Wellingborough

Newton Bromswold is a village and civil parish about 1.9 miles (3.1 km) east of Rushden in North Northamptonshire, England, adjacent to the border with Bedfordshire. At the 2001 census the parish's population was 62 people in 27 households. The population remained less than 100 at the 2011 Census and is included in the town of Rushden. It is near the villages of Wymington, Chelveston, Knotting, Knotting Green, Yelden and Melchbourne. There is a pub and a small church. The village takes its name from the forest which once stood where the village is today, called Bruneswald Forest.

The villages name means 'New farm/settlement'. Bromswold, 'Brun's forest', was an area of woodland on the Huntingdonshire and Northamptonshire border.

== The Swan public house ==
The village pub features in one of local author H. E. Bates's novels, and was frequented by US bomber pilots from nearby RAF Chelveston in the war. it has its own car park, a garden and a games room.

== St Peter's Church ==
The village's parish church, named for Saint Peter, is known for its exquisite medieval stained glass. The church has three bells, one of which is unmarked and it is thought to be over 500 years old.
