= Dean, Bedfordshire =

Former civil parish in Bedfordshire, England

Coordinates: 52.30379°N 0.45831°W

Dean
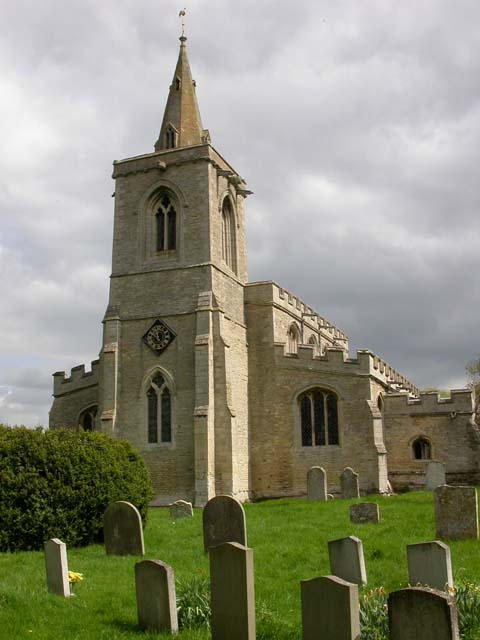
- Church of All Saints, Upper Dean

- Location within Bedfordshire
- Civil parish: Dean and Shelton
- Unitary authority: Bedford
- Shire county: Bedfordshire
- Region: East
- Country: England
- Sovereign state: United Kingdom
- Post town: HUNTINGDON
- Postcode district: PE28
- Dialling code: 01234
- UK Parliament: North Bedfordshire

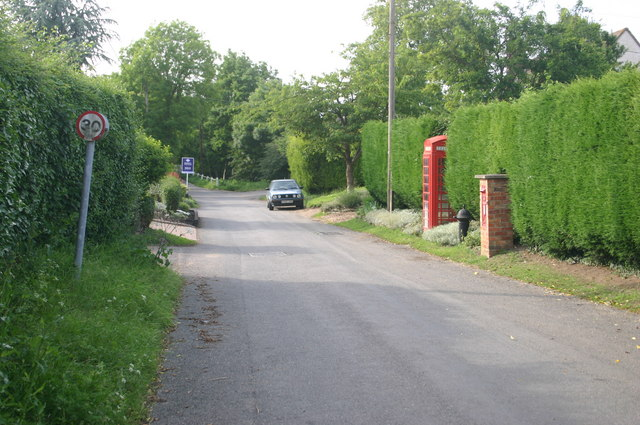
Lower Dean

Dean was an ancient parish in Bedfordshire, England. The parish included the two small villages of Upper Dean (which had the parish church) and Lower Dean, as well as surrounding rural areas. In 1934 the parish was merged with the neighbouring parish of Shelton to become the new parish of Dean and Shelton.

== History ==
The name "Dean" means 'Valley'. Dean was recorded in the Domesday Book as Dene.

In 1934 the parish was merged with the neighbouring parish of Shelton to form a new civil parish called Dean and Shelton. At the 1931 census (the last before the abolition of the parish), Dean had a population of 277.
