= Alfred John Church =

English classical scholar (1829–1912)

Alfred John Church (29 January 1829 – 27 April 1912) was an English classical scholar.

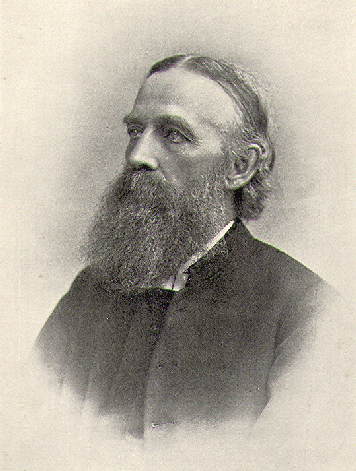
Alfred John Church

Church was born in London and was educated at King's College, London, and Lincoln College, Oxford. He took holy orders and was an assistant-master at Merchant Taylors' School from 1857 to 1870. He subsequently served as headmaster of Henley-on-Thames Royal Grammar School from 1870 to 1873, and then of King Edward VI School, Retford, from 1873 to 1880. From 1880 until 1888 he was professor of Latin at University College, London.

While at University College in partnership with William Jackson Brodribb, he translated Tacitus and edited Pliny's Letters (Epistulae). Church also wrote a number of stories in English re-telling of classical tales and legends for young people (Stories from Virgil, Stories from Homer, etc.). He also wrote much Latin and English verse, and in 1908 published his Memories of Men and Books. Church died in Richmond, Surrey.

== Publications ==
- The Bible Examiner: Containing Various Prophetic Expositions
- The life of Cnaeus Julius Agricola by Tacitus, Translated by Alfred John Church and William Jackson Brodribb
- Select Letters of Pliny the Younger. (1871); translated and edited by A. J. Church and W. J. Brodribb
- Stories from Virgil. (1879)
- Stories from the Greek Tragedians. (1880)
- The Story of the Persian War. (1881)
- Stories of the East from Herodotus. (1881)
- Roman life in the days of Cicero. (1883)
- Stories from Livy. (1883)
- The Count of the Saxon Shore. (1887) historical novel - with collaboration of Ruth Putnam.
- The Hammer. (1890)
- Stories from the Bible (1890)
- The Laureate's Country (1891) - with illustrations from drawings by Edward Hull.
- Callias. (1891)
- The burning of Rome: or, a story of the days of Nero. (1891)
- The Story of the Odyssey. (1892)
- The Story of the Iliad. (1895)
- Lords of the World. (1897)
- Stories from Ancient History (1907) - with illustrations by H. R. Millar.
- The Faery Queen and Her Knights (1909)
