= Knotting and Souldrop =

- Civil parish
- Interactive map of Knotting and Souldrop
- Coordinates: 52.250°N 0.542°W
- Country: England
- Primary council: Bedford
- County: Bedfordshire
- Region: East of England
- Status: Parish
- Main settlements: Knotting; Knotting Green; Souldrop

Government
  - Type: Parish Council
  - UK Parliament: North Bedfordshire

Population (2011)
  - Total: 238
- Postal code: MK44
- Area code: MK

Knotting and Souldrop is a civil parish in the Borough of Bedford in the county of Bedfordshire, England.

The two parishes of Knotting and Souldrop were combined in 1934. Until 1974 the parish formed part of Bedford Rural District.
