= H. C. Asterley =

British writer and colonial administrator

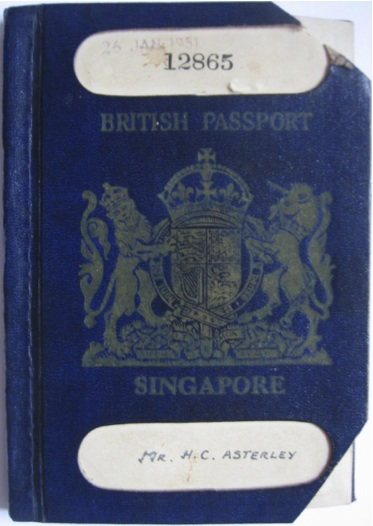
Asterley's Singapore passport, issued in 1951

Hugh Cecil Asterley (10 May 1902 – 1973) was a British writer and colonial administrator, who wrote crime and mystery stories and novels, usually with a south-east Asian setting, as H. C. Asterley.

== Early life ==
Asterley was born in Souldrop, Bedfordshire.

== Career ==
Asterley was a civil servant, who spent much of his career in Singapore.

His first novel, Rowena Goes Too Far was published in 1931. A bestseller in the UK, it was banned in Australia due to customs belief that it “lacked sufficient claim to the literary to excuse the obscenity”.

His 1961 novel, Escape to Berkshire, was a change in style, being a post-nuclear war survival novel about the destruction of, and escape from, London.

== Publications ==
- Rowena Goes Too Far. London: Jarrolds, 1931.
- A Tale of Two Murders. London: Jarrolds, 1932 (published as Mortmain in the USA).
- Land of Short Shadows. London: Jarrolds, 1933.
- Jungle Leech.. London: Jarrolds, 1935.
- Escape to Berkshire. London: Pall Mall Press, 1961.
