= Francis Dillingham =

English Protestant scholar

- Born: 1568; Dean, Bedfordshire, England
- Died: 1625 (aged 56–57); Wilden, Bedfordshire, England
- Education: Christ's College, Cambridge
- Occupation(s): Cleric, translator

Francis Dillingham (born 1568 in Dean, Bedfordshire – died 1625 in Wilden, Bedfordshire) was an English Protestant scholar, cleric and Bible translator.

== Career ==
Dillingham was educated at Christ's College, Cambridge, becoming a Fellow there in 1594. He was appointed to the "First Cambridge Company", charged by James I of England with translating parts of the Old Testament for the King James Version of the Bible. He was renowned for his mastery of the Greek language and wrote several theological treatises, including a Manual of the Christian Faith.

Francis Dillingham was the eldest son of Walter Dillingham (died 1581), yeoman of Over Dean, who was himself a son of John and Joan Dillingham. In his nuncupative will, Walter mentions his wife Ales or Alice, and his father-in-law, Thomas Rolte. Francis Dillingham, who rates an entry in the Oxford Dictionary of National Biography, although this does not recognise his parentage or his maternal connection with the Roltes, was baptised at Dean, Bedfordshire, as the son of Walter, on 15 August 1568. After completing his education at Christ's College, Cambridge, Francis was put forward by his uncle, John Rolte, as Rector of Wilden, Bedfordshire, in 1601. The Roltes were from a branch of the Milton-Ernest family, which held Wilden Manor for 200 years. Walter's marriage into the family was a social advance. Francis was a prolific writer on religious themes and a member of the committee of divines appointed by James I to produce the 1611 translation of the Bible.
