= Edward Hull (watercolourist) =

English painter (1823–1906)

- Born: 1823; Keysoe, Bedfordshire, England
- Died: 3 February 1906 (c. aged 83)
- Occupations: painter, illustrator
- Relatives: William Hull (brother)

Edward Hull (1823 – 3 February 1906) was a British illustrator and watercolourist who exhibited at the Royal Academy in London. He was the brother of William Hull, another well known illustrator and watercolour painter.

== Biography ==
Hull was born in Keysoe in Bedfordshire, England, the fourth son (and sixth child) of a farmer, James Hull, who became a Moravian missionary to Manchester. He was an engraver who also painted many watercolours and, in later life, became known as a book illustrator. He was employed from 1855 to 1861 by The Illustrated Times, a successful London weekly, and was an illustrator for several books such as Stratford on Avon by Sidney Lee (published around 1890) and The Laureate's Country (a book on Alfred Tennyson) by Alfred J. Church, published around the same time.

Hull symbolises the spirit of illustration in the 19th century. The great illustrators such as Phiz (who illustrated many of Dickens's books) are well known. Hull represents the many who plied their trade in periodicals and books before the advent of photography in the early 20th century. Hull was also a wood-engraver as recognised by his inclusion in Rodney Engen's Dictionary of Victorian Wood Engravers (1990).

Hull lived most of his life in London. He travelled widely in England as his paintings and illustrations show. He married and had two daughters and three granddaughters. He died on 3 February 1906 and is buried in St Peter's Church at Sharnbrook, Bedfordshire.

The Royal Academy shows a number of Hull's paintings being exhibited there to 1874. The earliest one shown from 1827 is by another Edward Hull, a son of Thomas Henry Hull – a well-known miniaturist – and originally thought to be a relative of Edward Hull (1823–1906), but they are no longer thought to be related. The two are often confused. There is also another Edward Hull who was a furniture maker and shop owner who was a close friend of Augustus Pugin (the designer of much of the interior of the House of Commons). He also lived in London at the same time but is also not related.

== Illustrated books ==
- Church, Alfred J. The Laureate's Country: a description of places connected with the life of Alfred Lord Tennyson - Seeley & Co Ltd. 1891.
- Lee, Sidney. Stratford-on-Avon - Seeley & Co Ltd. 1885.
- Hull, Edward. William Cowper Album - Produced for Frederick Cosens (a wealthy sherry merchant) in 1889 and re-published to commemorate the 250th Anniversary of Cowper's birth on 15 November 1981.
