= Church of All Saints, Little Staughton =

Church in Little Staughton, Bedfordshire, England

Coordinates: 52.2540°N 0.3792°W

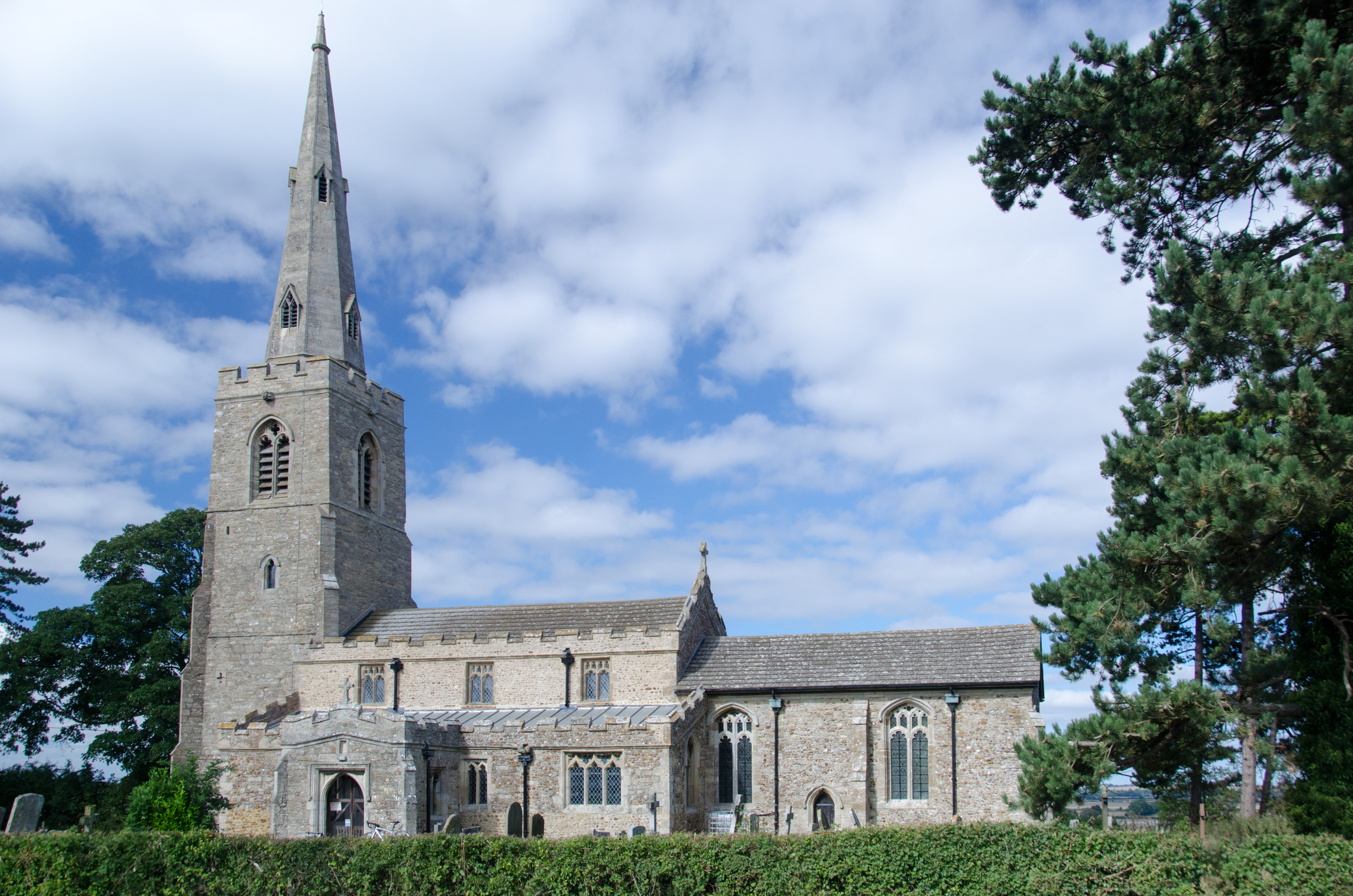
Church of All Saints, Little Staughton

Church of All Saints is a Grade I listed church in Little Staughton, Bedfordshire, England. Originally known as the Church of St Margaret, it was largely built in the 15th century, with some earlier features. Much of the detail and many of the furnishings were destroyed during the reformation. The spire was damaged by lightning in 1900, and restored in 1910. The church became a listed building in 1964.

== History ==
Originally known as the Church of St Margaret, referring to Margaret the Virgin, a martyr who lived in Antioch in 304. The church was renamed to Church of All Saints during the 1800s, although there has been a side chapel dedicated to St Margaret since 1937.

The building was largely damaged during the reformation, where many of the unique features such as the stained glass, statues and decoration were destroyed. During the 1800s, while the church was being restored, the lead was stolen from the roof. In 1900, the tower was damaged by a lightning strike, partially demolishing the spire - it was fully restored in 1910. The church became a listed building on 13 July 1964. To commemorate the new millennium, floodlights were installed to light the church for special occasions and on weekends.

== Building ==
Church of All Saints in Little Staughton was built largely in the 15th century, although it does include some 13th and 14th century features. The church is largely built of coarse limestone rubble and brown cobblestones, with features in ashlar. The chancel was built in the 15th century, however it includes a door from the 14th century.

== See also ==
- Grade I listed buildings in Bedfordshire
