= Church of St Margaret, Knotting, Bedfordshire =

Church in Knotting, Bedfordshire, England

Coordinates: 52.2603°N 0.5324°W

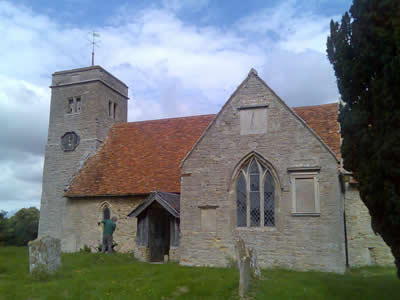
Southern side of the church (2008)

Church of St Margaret (also known as the Church of St Margaret of Antioch) is a redundant Grade I listed church in Knotting, Bedfordshire, England. It became a listed building on 13 July 1964. The church was originally built in the 12th century. It was vested into the Churches Conservation Trust in 2009 and underwent a renovation.

The building, which features a west tower, a nave, a chancel and a south aisle, is constructed of limestone rubble and has a clay-tiled roof. The tower is of a much later date than the rest of the building. It has datestone of 1615 in its parapet. The chancel was rebuilt in the 13th century.

The church's benches date from the 16th and 17th centuries.

== Interior ==
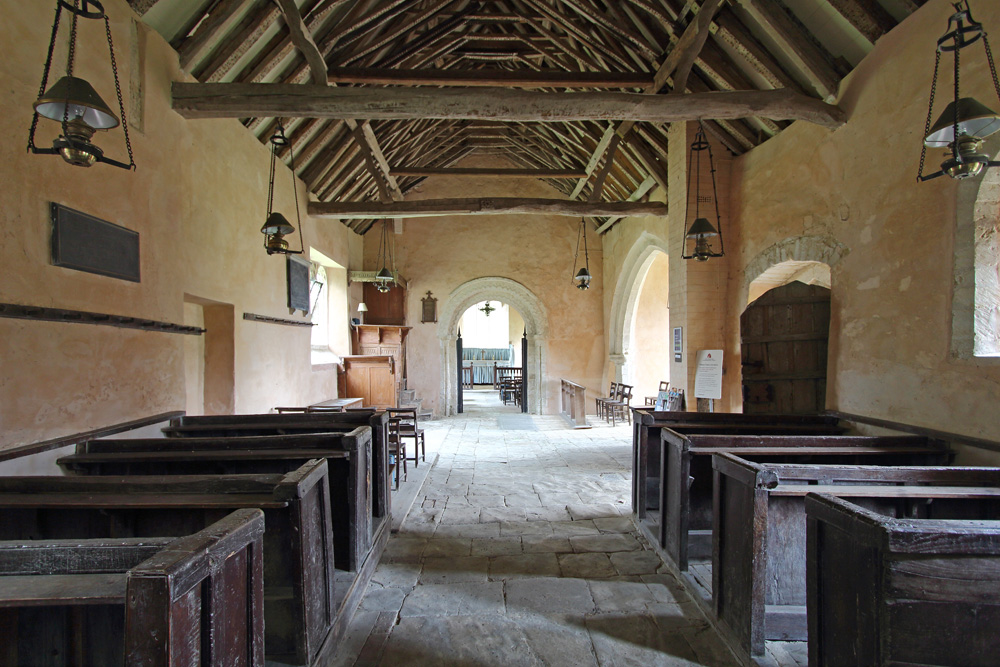
Eastern end

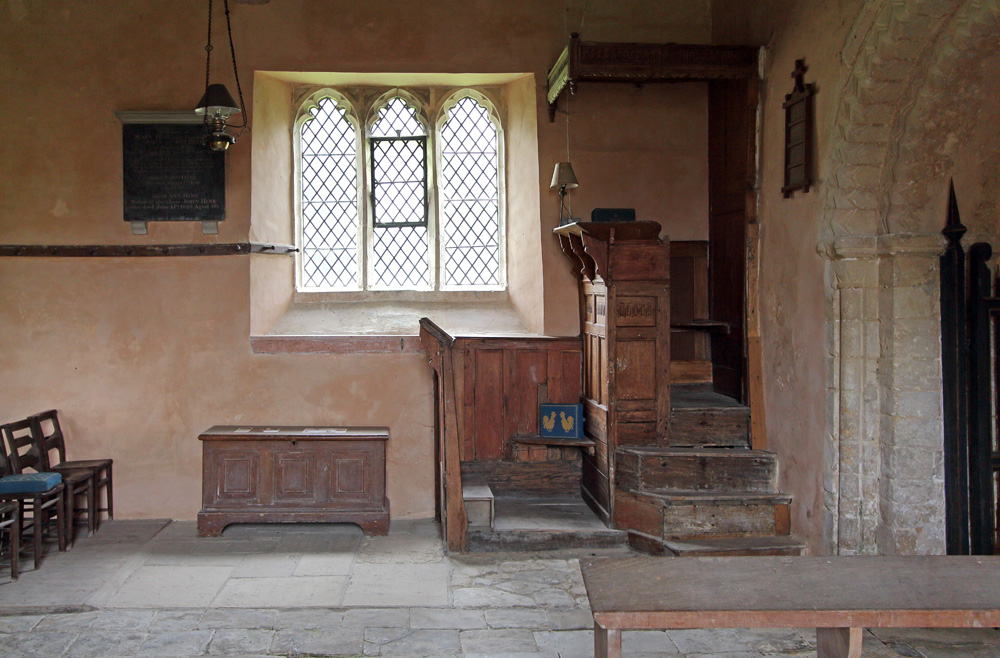
Pulpit

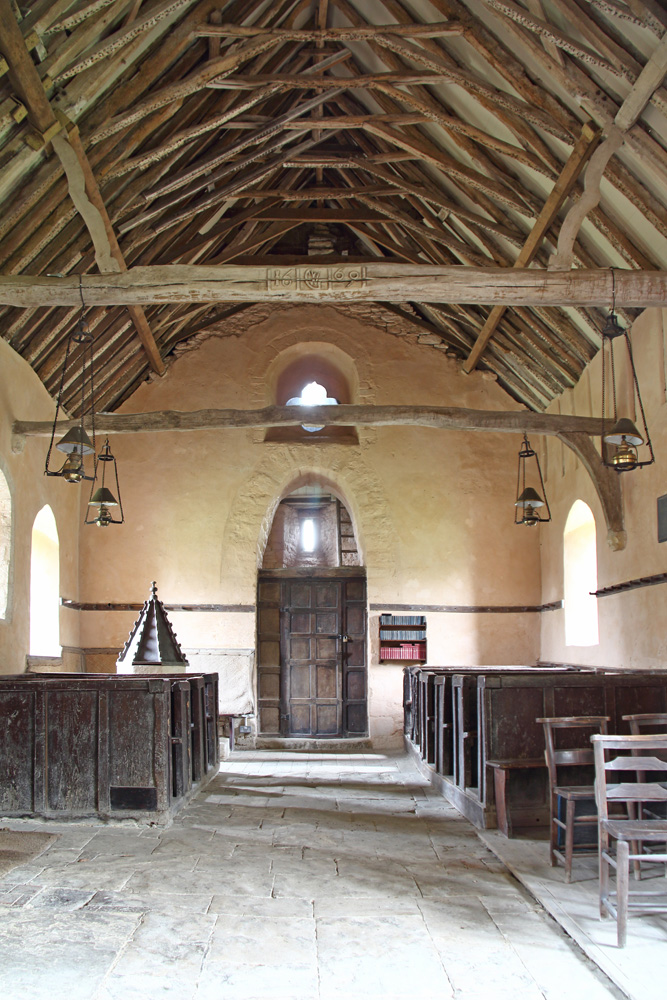
Western end

== See also ==
- Grade I listed buildings in Bedfordshire
- List of churches preserved by the Churches Conservation Trust in the East of England
