= Church of St Peter, Pertenhall =

Church in Pertenhall, Bedfordshire, England

Coordinates: 52.2762°N 0.4123°W

The church in 2009

Church of St Peter is a Grade I listed church in Pertenhall, Bedfordshire, England. It became a listed building on 13 July 1964.

== See also ==
- Grade I listed buildings in Bedfordshire
