= Keysoe Row =

Coordinates: 52.23831°N 0.41662°W

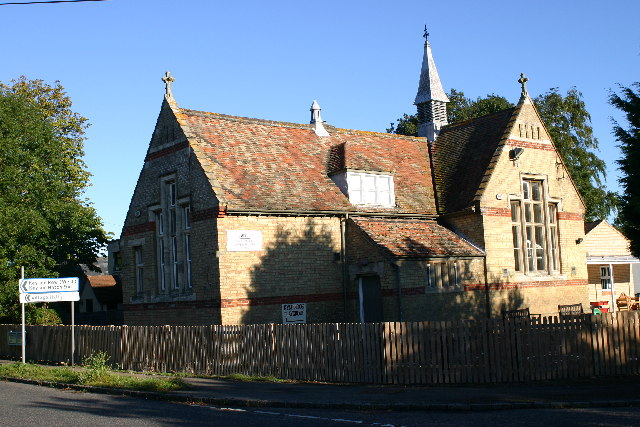
- Kymbrook Lower School

- Location within Bedfordshire
- OS grid reference: TL082611
- Civil parish: Bolnhurst and Keysoe
- Unitary authority: Bedford
- Ceremonial county: Bedfordshire
- Region: East
- Country: England
- Sovereign state: United Kingdom
- Post town: BEDFORD
- Postcode district: MK44
- Dialling code: 01234
- Police: Bedfordshire
- Fire: Bedfordshire
- Ambulance: East of England
- UK Parliament: North Bedfordshire

Keysoe Row is a hamlet located in the Borough of Bedford in Bedfordshire, England.

The settlement is located to the south of the village of Keysoe, and is part of the wider Bolnhurst and Keysoe civil parish.

Kymbrook Primary School is located in the area.
