= Melchbourne and Yielden =

Civil parish in Bedfordshire, England

- Civil parish
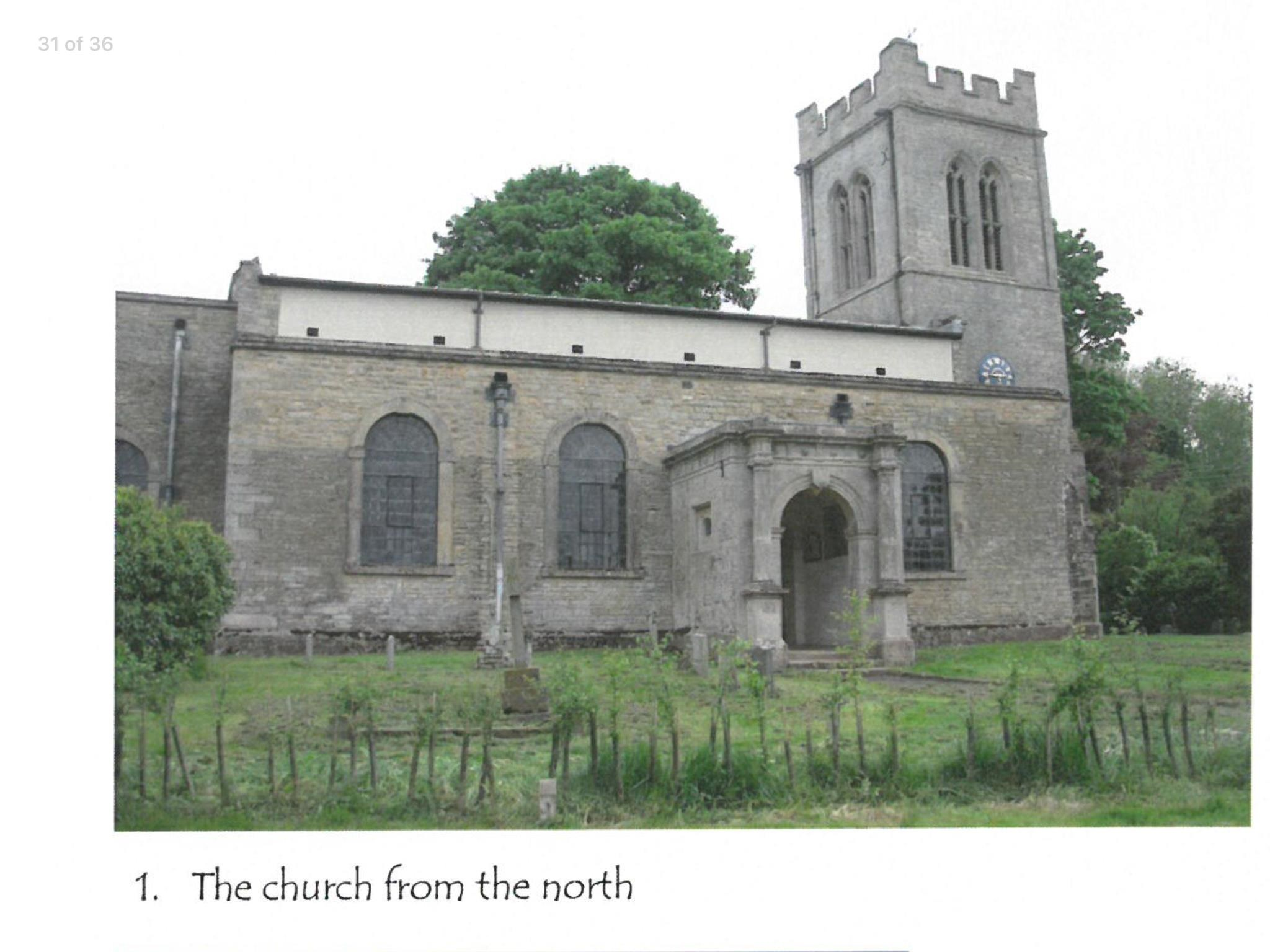
- Interactive map of Melchbourne and Yielden
- Coordinates: 52.286°N 0.505°W
- Country: England
- Primary council: Bedford
- County: Bedfordshire
- Region: East of England
- Status: Parish
- Main settlements: Melchbourne, Yelden

Government
  - Type: Parish Council
  - UK Parliament: North Bedfordshire

Population (2011)
  - Total: 392
- Postal code: MK44
- Area code: MK
- Website: Melchbourne and Yelden Parish Council

Melchbourne and Yielden is a civil parish in the Borough of Bedford in the county of Bedfordshire, England.

The two parishes of Melchbourne and Yelden (also known as Yielden) were combined in 1934. Until 1974 the parish formed part of Bedford Rural District.

The official name of the parish as recorded by the Office for National Statistics and Ordnance Survey is "Melchbourne and Yielden", but the parish council calls itself "Melchbourne and Yelden Parish Council", using the other common variant spelling for Yelden. Ordnance Survey maps prior to the 1934 parish merger generally used the name "Yelden" for both the village and parish, whereas their maps since 1934 generally call the village "Yelden" but the parish "Melchbourne and Yielden", suggesting that the official use of the spelling "Yielden" in the merged parish name may have arisen from the 1934 North Bedfordshire Review Order which merged the parishes.
