= Yielden Castle =

- Yelden, Bedfordshire, England
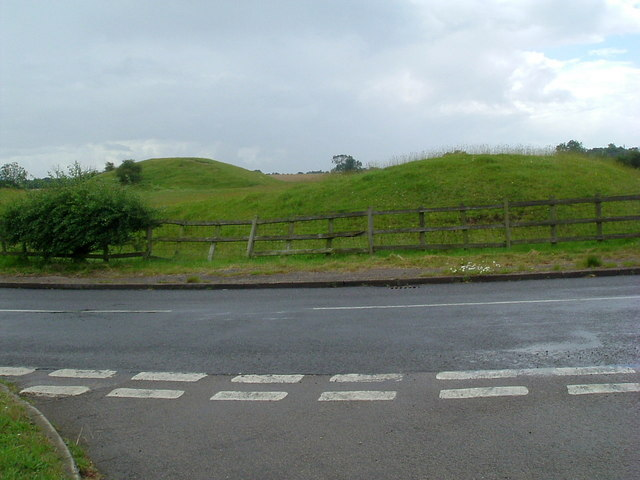
- Remaining earthworks

Site information
- Type: Castle
- Condition: Fragments and earthworks

Location
- Coordinates: 52.2912°N 0.5150°W
- Grid reference: grid reference TL01386694

Yielden Castle was a twelfth-century castle located in the village of Yelden in the county of Bedfordshire, England.

== Details ==
Yielden Castle has also been known, or recorded as, "Yeldon Castle", "Yelden Castle", "Giuelden Castle" and "Yielding Castle". It was a Motte-and-bailey castle that had two baileys. It was first mentioned in historical records in 1173 and was the stronghold of the Trailly family until the thirteenth century. The castle was in decay by 1360.

Excavations were done on the site in 1881 and 1882. A thirteenth-century stone curtain was found at that time. Today, it is little more than a grassed-over earthworks mound, though some remains can be seen. It is a Scheduled Monument.

== See also ==
- Castles in Great Britain and Ireland
- List of castles in England
