= Church of St Mary the Virgin, Shelton, North Bedfordshire =

Church in Bedfordshire, England

Coordinates: 52.3075°N 0.4853°W

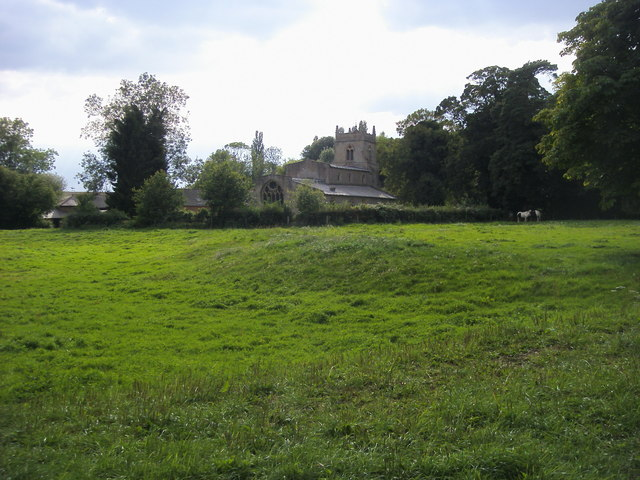
St Mary's church, Shelton

Church of St Mary the Virgin is a Grade I listed church in Shelton, Bedfordshire, England.

== See also ==
- Grade I listed buildings in Bedfordshire
