= Dean and Shelton =

- Civil parish
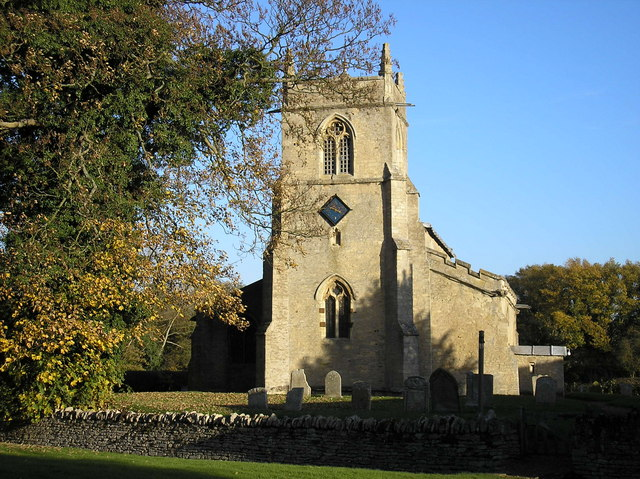
- St Mary's Church, Shelton
- Interactive map of Dean and Shelton
- Coordinates: 52.307°N 0.473°W
- Country: England
- Primary council: Bedford
- County: Bedfordshire
- Region: East of England
- Status: Parish
- Main settlements: Lower Dean; Shelton; Upper Dean

Government
  - Type: Parish Council
  - UK Parliament: North Bedfordshire

Population (2011)
  - Total: 418
- Time zone
- Postal code: PE28
- Area code: PE
- Website: Dean and Shelton Parish Council

Dean and Shelton is a civil parish in the Bedford district, in the ceremonial county of Bedfordshire, England.

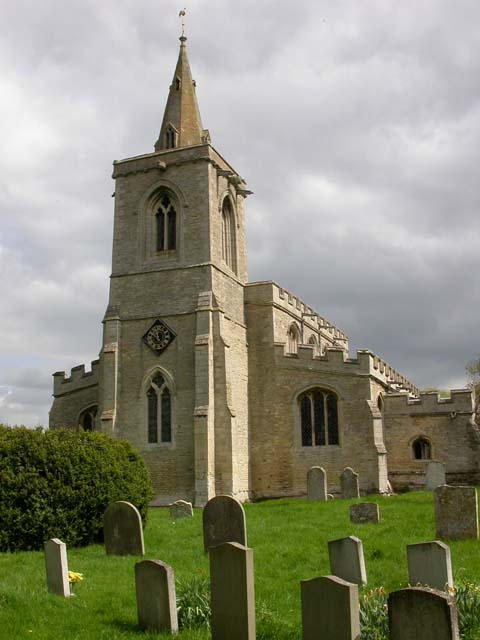
All Hallows Church, Upper Dean

The two parishes of Dean and Shelton were combined on 1 April 1934. Until 1974 the parish formed part of Bedford Rural District. In 2011 it had a population of 418.
