= Lower Dean =

Coordinates: 52.30827°N 0.45439°W

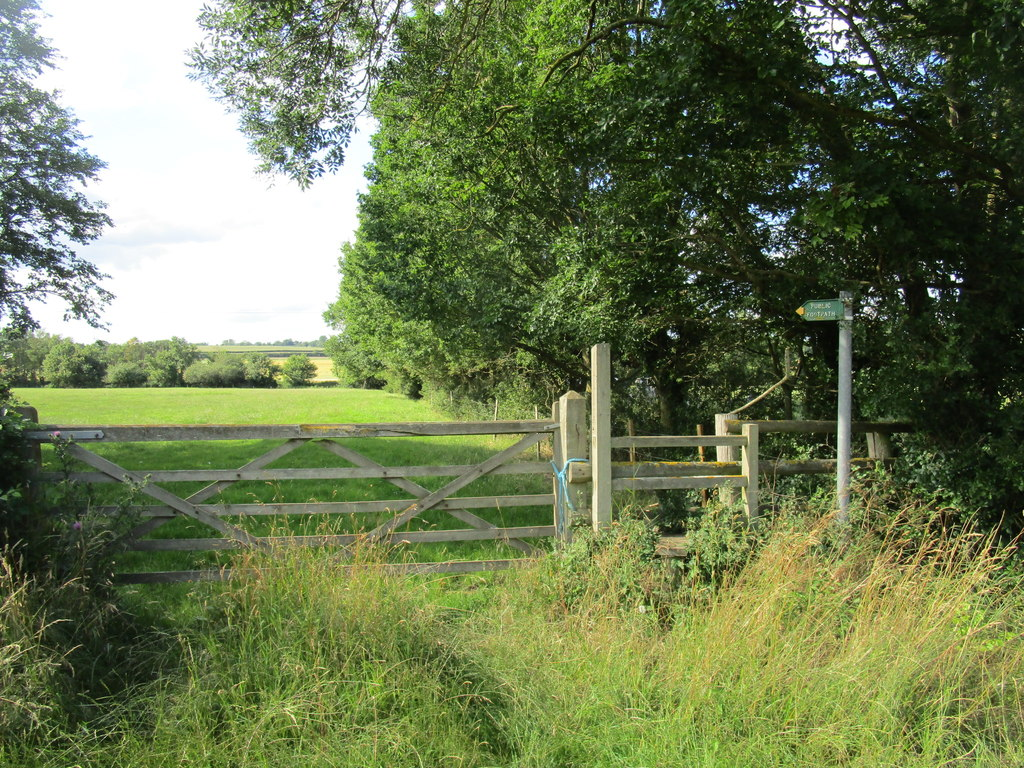
- Footpath in Lower Dean

- Location within Bedfordshire
- OS grid reference: TL054689
- Civil parish: Dean and Shelton
- Unitary authority: Bedford
- Ceremonial county: Bedfordshire
- Region: East
- Country: England
- Sovereign state: United Kingdom
- Post town: HUNTINGDON
- Postcode district: PE28
- Dialling code: 01234
- Police: Bedfordshire
- Fire: Bedfordshire
- Ambulance: East of England
- UK Parliament: North Bedfordshire

Lower Dean is a village located in the Borough of Bedford in Bedfordshire, England. Dean is a modernized version of the Anglo-Saxon word "denu," which means "valley."

The village forms part of the Dean and Shelton civil parish (where the 2011 Census population was included), and is close to the county border with Northamptonshire and the district of Huntingdonshire in Cambridgeshire. The village has a population of about 200, and attracts visitors interested in the village's medieval past.

Lower Dean includes a now-closed Methodist chapel built in 1846, the Manor House Farm of William Strangward, and Dean Hall, an 18th-century brick house with a tile roof and a paneled entrance hall.
