= Swineshead Wood =

Coordinates: 52.289541°N 0.445122°W

- Site of Special Scientific Interest
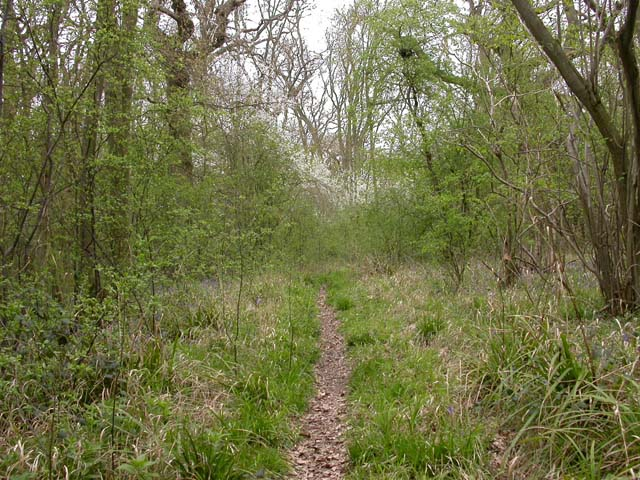
- Location of Swineshead Wood.
- Area of search: Bedfordshire
- Grid reference: TL061668
- Interest: Biological
- Area: 21.6 hectares
- Notification date: 1985
- Location map: Magic Map

Swineshead Wood is a 21.6-hectare (53-acre) biological Site of Special Scientific Interest in Swineshead in Bedfordshire, England.

== Overview ==
It is owned by the Woodland Trust, and the local planning authority is Bedford Borough Council.

The site is wet woodland, which has structural and biological diversity. The most common trees are pedunculate oak and ash and on heavy clay, and bluebells and dog's mercury dominate the ground flora.

There is access from Sandye Lane, which runs along the wood's southern border.
