= Bolnhurst and Keysoe =

- Civil parish
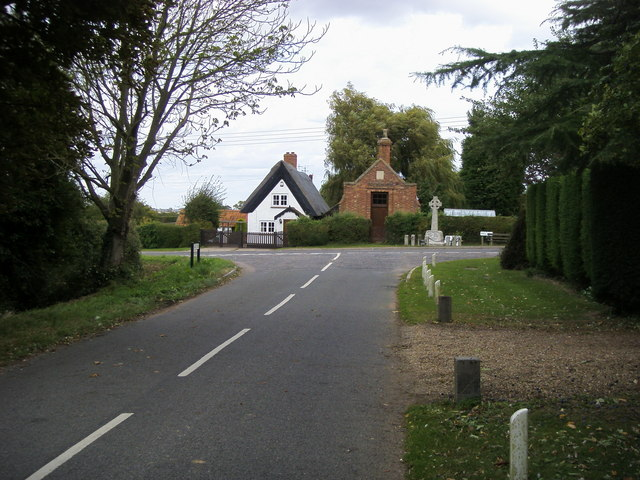
- Interactive map of Bolnhurst and Keysoe
- Coordinates: 52°14′N 0°25′W
- Country: England
- Primary council: Bedford
- County: Bedfordshire
- Region: East of England
- Status: Parish
- Main settlements: Bolnhurst; Keysoe; Keysoe Row

Government
  - Type: Parish Council
  - UK Parliament: North Bedfordshire

Population 719 (2011 Census)
  - Total: 734
- Website: Bolnhurst and Keysoe Parish Council

Bolnhurst and Keysoe is a civil parish in the Borough of Bedford in Bedfordshire, England. According to the 2001 census it had a population of 734, reducing to 719 at the 2011 Census. The parish includes the villages of Bolnhurst and Keysoe, and the hamlet of Keysoe Row. The parish is located about eight miles north of Bedford.
