= Knotting, Bedfordshire =

Village in Bedfordshire, England

Coordinates: 52.25°N 0.5333°W

Knotting
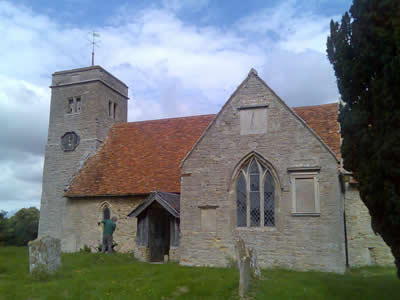
- St. Margaret's Church in Knotting

- Location within Bedfordshire
- OS grid reference: TL001136
- Civil parish: Knotting and Souldrop
- Unitary authority: Bedford
- Ceremonial county: Bedfordshire
- Region: East
- Country: England
- Sovereign state: United Kingdom
- Post town: BEDFORD
- Postcode district: MK44
- Dialling code: 01234
- Police: Bedfordshire
- Fire: Bedfordshire
- Ambulance: East of England
- UK Parliament: North Bedfordshire

Knotting is a village in the civil parish of Knotting and Souldrop, in the Bedford borough of Bedfordshire, England. It is located near the border with Northamptonshire. Nearby places are, Sharnbrook, Podington, Odell, Melchbourne, Yelden, Newton Bromswold, Souldrop and Rushden over the border in Northamptonshire.

Knotting historically formed part of the ancient parish of Melchbourne. Knotting's parish church of St Margaret was initially built as a chapel of ease to the church at Melchbourne. In 1176 Knotting was made a separate parish, independent from Melchbourne.

In 1934 the civil parish of Knotting was merged with the neighbouring parish of Souldrop to become a new parish called Knotting and Souldrop. At the 1931 census (the last before the abolition of the parish), Knotting had a population of 114.

== Parish church ==
The Parish Church is partly of 12th century Norman construction, including a chancel arch with carved decoration, and is dedicated to St Margaret. The registers date from 1592 and many of these are deposited at the Bedfordshire and Luton Archives and Records Service. The church was vested with the Churches Conservation Trust on 1 April 2009.
