= Bolnhurst =

Village in Bedfordshire, England

Coordinates: 52.22481°N 0.41151°W

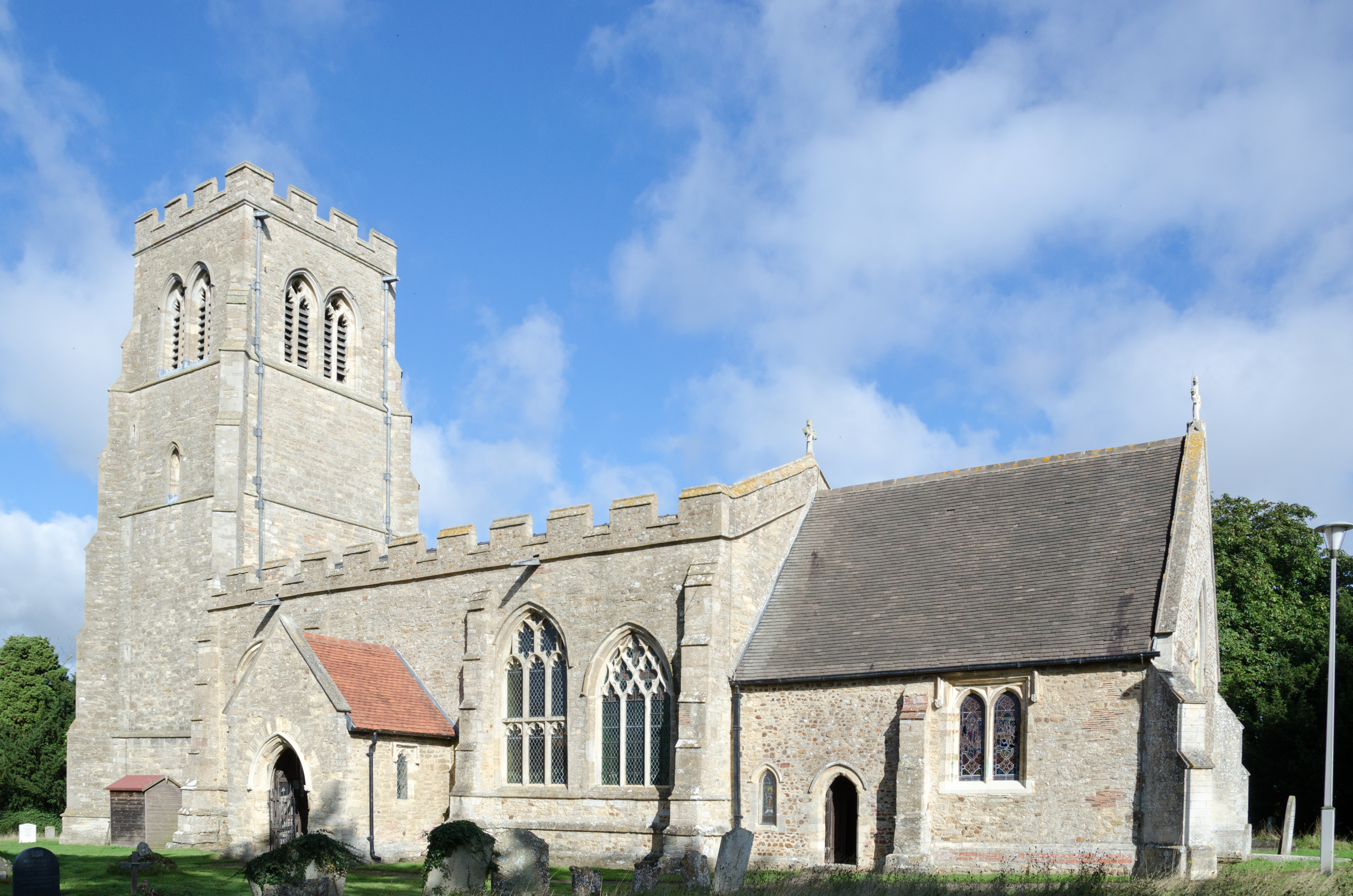
- St Dunstan's parish church

- Location within Bedfordshire
- OS grid reference: TL086597
- Civil parish: Bolnhurst and Keysoe
- Unitary authority: Bedford
- Ceremonial county: Bedfordshire
- Region: East
- Country: England
- Sovereign state: United Kingdom
- Post town: Bedford
- Postcode district: MK44
- Dialling code: 01234
- Police: Bedfordshire
- Fire: Bedfordshire
- Ambulance: East of England
- UK Parliament: North Bedfordshire
- Website: Bolnhurst and Keysoe Parish Council

Bolnhurst is a small village in the civil parish of Bolnhurst and Keysoe, in the Borough of Bedford in Bedfordshire, England. The village is about 6 miles (9.7 km) north-northeast of Bedford town centre and about 6 miles (10 km) west of St Neots.

== History ==
The name is derived from the Old English bula-hyrst, meaning "wooded hill where bulls are kept". Bolnhurst grew up around the main road between Bedford and Kimbolton, Cambridgeshire. the Domesday Book of 1086 lists it as Bulehestre or Bolehestre. At that time the manor was held by Thorney Abbey. The Abbey retained Bolnhurst until the Dissolution of the Monasteries in the 16th century.

After inclosure of the parish in 1778, Arthur Young, despite never having visited the village, described Bolnhurst as:

a wet heavy bad country very disadvantageously circumstanced respecting roads, for every way around they are almost impassable... after inclosing fell into bad hands, they laid much of it down to grass in as bad order as possible, and it has continued so ever since in as rough and ill conditioned and unprofitable a state as can be well conceived... It should seem that corn has there been lessened without making amends for the loss by ample products of new grass.

Bolnhurst was an ancient parish in the Stodden hundred of Bedfordshire. In 1934 the parish was merged with the neighbouring parish of Keysoe to form a new civil parish called Bolnhust and Keysoe. At the 1931 census (the last before the abolition of the parish), Bolnhurst had a population of 162.

== Parish church ==
The Church of England parish church of St Dunstan is about 2/5 mile (1 km) southwest of the current village. The earliest part of the present building is the 13th-century chancel. The chancel arch and three of the nave windows are 14th-century, including a three-light Decorated Gothic traceried one on the south side. But most of the nave is now Perpendicular Gothic, including two transomed and traceried windows on the north side.

Inside the nave over the north door is the remains of a large medieval wall painting of St Christopher. In the northeast corner of the nave are monuments to two members of the Francklin family: John (died 1707) and Dame Dorothy (died 1727).

St Dunstan's is a Grade II* listed building. The ecclesiastical parish is part of the Benefice of Keysoe with Bolnhurst and Little Staughton.

The tower has a ring of four bells. John Dier of Hitchin, Hertfordshire cast the second and third bells in 1587. One of the Newcombe family of bellfounders from Leicester cast the tenor bell in 1618. Alfred Bowell of Ipswich, Suffolk cast the treble bell in 1907.

== Culture and community ==
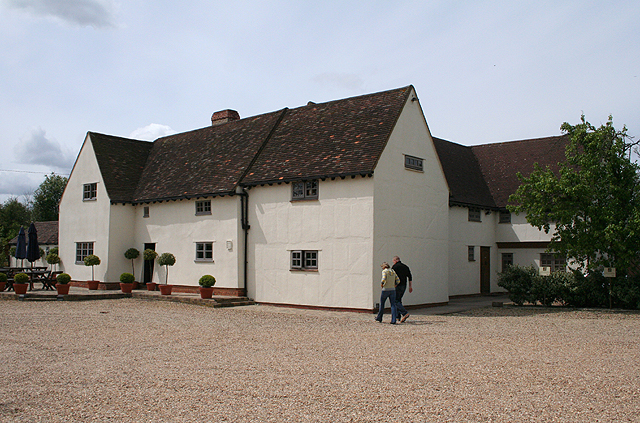
The Plough pub

Bolnhurst has a pub, The Plough, which is a 17th-century Jacobean building.

Since 1984 Bolnhurst has hosted the annual Bolnhurst Vintage and Country Fayre, which is a rally of historic tractors, cars and other vehicles.

== Sources ==
- Pevsner, Nikolaus (1968). Bedfordshire and the County of Huntingdon and Peterborough. The Buildings of England. Harmondsworth: Penguin Books. pp. 58–59. ISBN 0-14-0710-34-5.
- Mills, A.D.; Room, Adrian (2003). A Dictionary of British Place-Names. Oxford: Oxford University Press. ISBN 0198527586.
- Page, W.H., ed. (1912). A History of the County of Bedford. Victoria County History. Vol. 3. Westminster: Archibald Constable & Co. pp. 124–128.
- Young, Arthur (1785–1809). Annals of Agriculture and other useful Arts. Vol. XLII. p. 41.
