= Shelton, North Bedfordshire =

Village in Bedfordshire, England

Coordinates: 52.31131°N 0.48512°W

Shelton
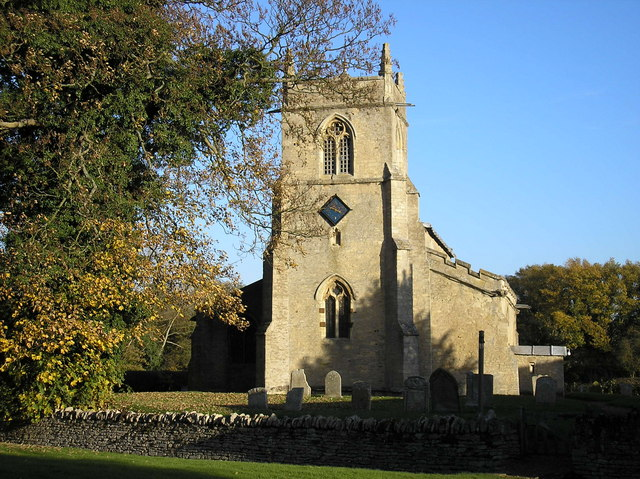
- St Mary's Church

- Location within Bedfordshire
- OS grid reference: TL033692
- Civil parish: Dean and Shelton
- Unitary authority: Bedford
- Ceremonial county: Bedfordshire
- Region: East
- Country: England
- Sovereign state: United Kingdom
- Post town: HUNTINGDON
- Postcode district: PE28
- Dialling code: 01933
- Police: Bedfordshire
- Fire: Bedfordshire
- Ambulance: East of England
- UK Parliament: North Bedfordshire

Shelton is a village in the civil parish of Dean and Shelton, in the Bedford borough of Bedfordshire, England. It is close to the county boundary with Northamptonshire and the district of Huntingdonshire in Cambridgeshire.

The 14th century Church of St Mary the Virgin is located in the village. It is a grade I listed building.

Shelton was an ancient parish in the Stodden hundred of Bedfordshire. In 1931 the parish was merged with the neighbouring parish of Dean to form a new parish called Dean and Shelton. At the 1931 census (the last before the abolition of the parish), Shelton had a population of 101.
