= Keysoe =

Village in Bedfordshire, England

Coordinates: 52.25177°N 0.42469°W

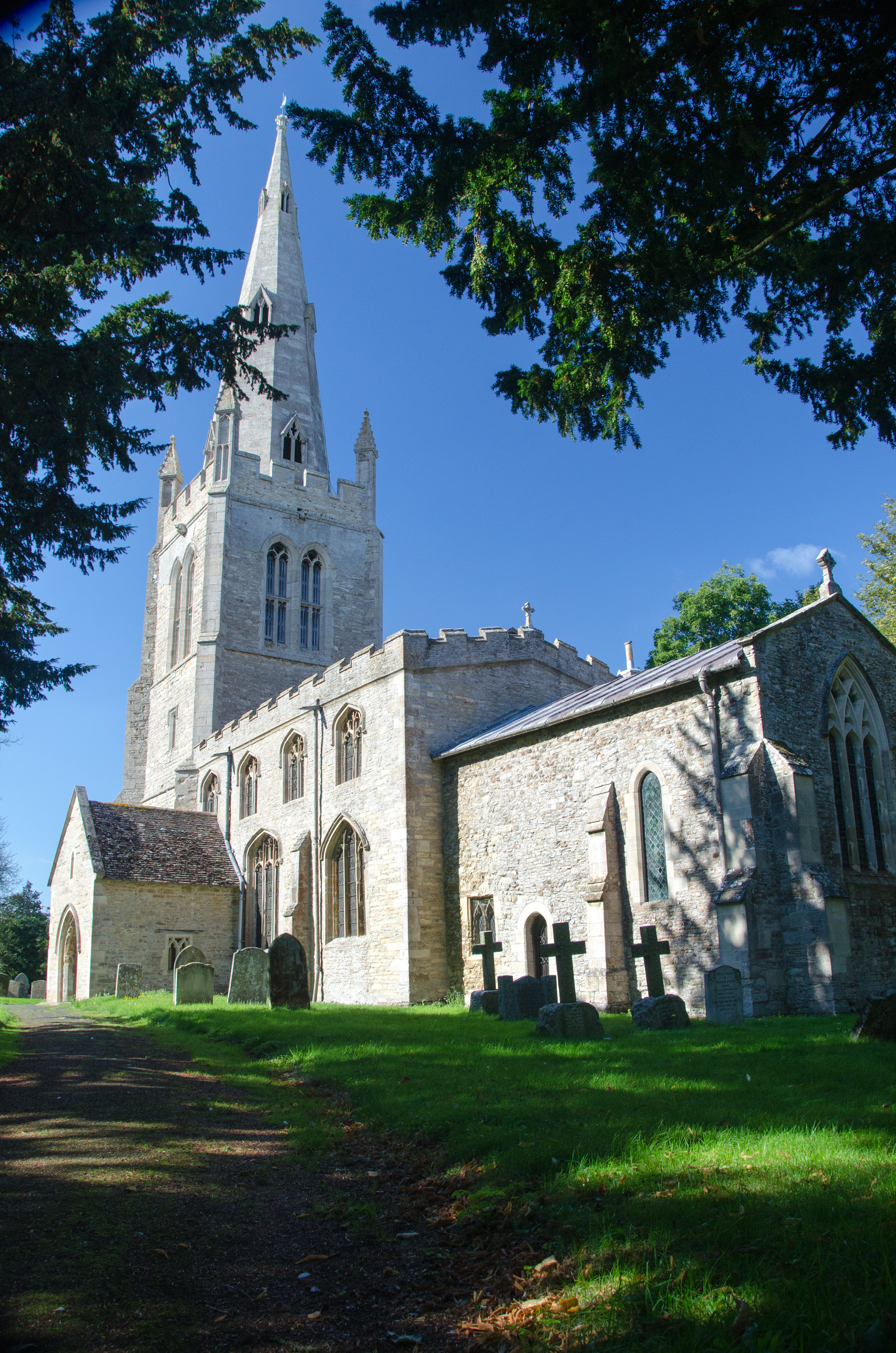
- Parish church of St Mary

- Location within Bedfordshire
- OS grid reference: TL076626
- Civil parish: Bolnhurst and Keysoe
- Unitary authority: Bedford
- Ceremonial county: Bedfordshire
- Region: East
- Country: England
- Sovereign state: United Kingdom
- Post town: BEDFORD
- Postcode district: MK44
- Dialling code: 01234
- Police: Bedfordshire
- Fire: Bedfordshire
- Ambulance: East of England
- UK Parliament: North Bedfordshire

Keysoe is a village in the civil parish of Bolnhurst and Keysoe, in the Bedford borough of Bedfordshire, England. The Church of St Mary the Virgin is located in the village.

Keysoe was an ancient parish in the Stodden hundred of Bedfordshire. In 1934 the civil parish was merged with the neighbouring parish of Bolnhurst to become a new parish called Bolnhurst and Keysoe. At the 1931 census (the last before the abolition of the parish), Keysoe had a population of 432.

The Keysoe International equestrian centre is based in Keysoe. The centre is a club and venue for horse sport events and training. The venue was used by equestrian teams training for the 2012 Summer Olympics and 2012 Summer Paralympics. 15 teams from around the world used Bedford Borough as their training base in preparation for the games.

== Notable residents ==
- Edward Hull, illustrator and watercolour painter, born in Keysoe in 1823
- William Hull, watercolour painter who lived in Keysoe during the 1820s
