= Melchbourne =

Village in Bedfordshire, England

Coordinates: 52.28055°N 0.49353°W

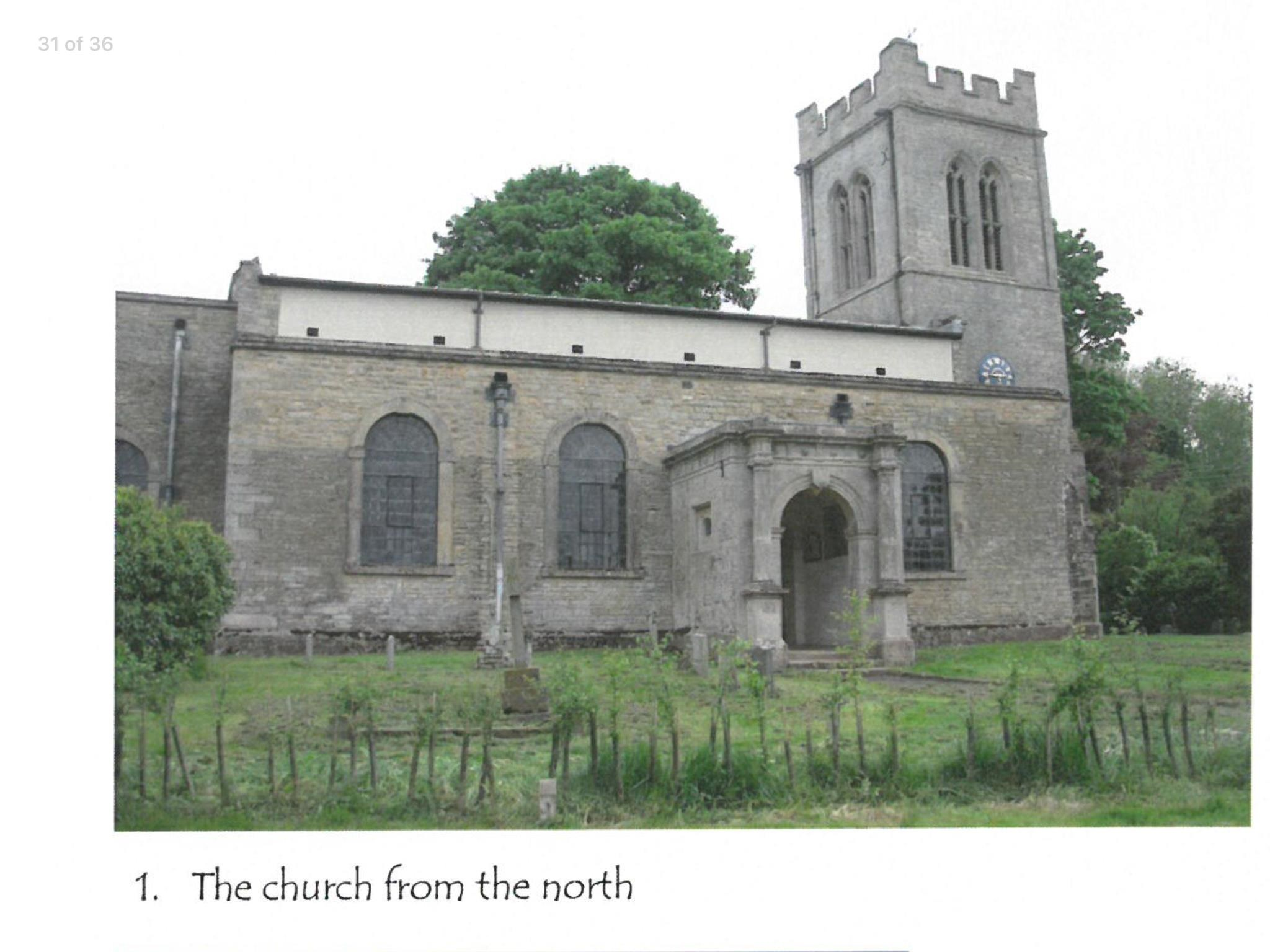
- Church of St Mary Magdalene, Melchbourne

- Location within Bedfordshire
- OS grid reference: TL028657
- Civil parish: Melchbourne and Yielden
- Unitary authority: Bedford
- Ceremonial county: Bedfordshire
- Region: East
- Country: England
- Sovereign state: United Kingdom
- Post town: BEDFORD
- Postcode district: MK44
- Dialling code: 01234
- Police: Bedfordshire
- Fire: Bedfordshire
- Ambulance: East of England
- UK Parliament: North Bedfordshire

Melchbourne is a village in the civil parish of Melchbourne and Yielden, in the Bedford borough of Bedfordshire, England. The village is located west of Swineshead and east of Yelden.

Melchbourne Preceptory was located in the village. The village includes the Church of St Mary Magdalene.

Melchbourne was an ancient parish in the Stodden hundred of Bedfordshire. In 1934 the parish was merged with the neighbouring parish of Yielden or Yelden to form a new parish called Melchbourne and Yielden. At the 1931 census (the last before the abolition of the parish), Melchbourne had a population of 160.

== Notable residents ==
- Audrey Lawson-Johnston, the last living survivor of the sinking of the RMS Lusitania in 1915.
- Sarah Kennedy, BBC radio presenter. Moved 2012
- Major Gen; Sir Percy Cox, British Diplomat (died there 1937) Influential figure in founding of Iraq.
