= Yelden =

Village in Bedfordshire, England

Coordinates: 52.2833°N 0.5166°W

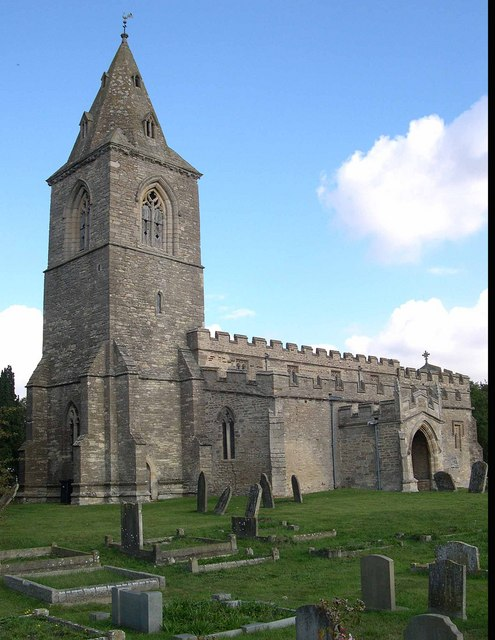
- Yelden Church

- Location within Bedfordshire
- OS grid reference: TL011746
- Civil parish: Melchbourne and Yielden
- Unitary authority: Bedford
- Ceremonial county: Bedfordshire
- Region: East
- Country: England
- Sovereign state: United Kingdom
- Post town: BEDFORD
- Postcode district: MK44
- Dialling code: 01933
- Police: Bedfordshire
- Fire: Bedfordshire
- Ambulance: East of England
- UK Parliament: North Bedfordshire

Yelden or Yielden is a village in the civil parish of Melchbourne and Yielden, in the Bedford borough of Bedfordshire, England, near the borders with Northamptonshire and Cambridgeshire. It lies on the River Til which feeds into the Great Ouse valley and is about 70 m (230 ft) above sea level. It is approximately 14 miles (23 km) north of Bedford, 3.75 miles (6.04 km) south-east of Higham Ferrers and 6.75 miles (10.86 km) west of Kimbolton.

The countryside around the village rises to about 90 m (300 ft) above sea level, is generally open and rolling in nature and is predominantly used for agricultural purposes. Yielden Castle was a Norman motte-and-bailey castle. Other notable features include the church of St Mary, a Wesleyan Chapel, and the Village Hall.

== History ==
Archaeological excavations carried out by Bedfordshire County Council along with other historical works have shown evidence of a near continuous occupation in the village dating back to the late Neolithic and early Bronze Age (c.2000 -800 BC). The village appeared in the Domesday Book of 1086 as 'Giveldene'.

Yelden was an ancient parish in the Stodden hundred of Bedfordshire. In 1931 the parish was merged with the neighbouring parish of Melchbourne to form a new civil parish called Melchbourne and Yielden. At the 1931 census (the last before the abolition of the parish), Yelden had a population of 150.

== Castle ==
This is a significant archaeological site and one of the most interesting of its type in the county. It was the site of a Norman motte and bailey castle that from Domesday to the 13th century was the stronghold of the Trailly family. It is an imposing feature with a central conical mound rising to about 40 feet above the bottom of its north moat. It is in 2 levels with 2 extensive baileys and is not surrounded by a moat. There have been suggestions that prior to Norman times it was occupied by the Iceni, an ancient tribe of Britains and that they battled with the Romans at the site but opinions differ as to the accuracy of this assertion. By 1360 it had fallen in disuse and ruin.

== Church of St Mary ==
It is a good example of a village church mainly in the Decorated style. Originally the Trailly family received it from the monks at Thorney Abbey early in the 12th Century and was confirmed to them by a charter of Pope Alexander III in 1162. Although Norman in origin its shows no indication of this in its construction. It consists of a Nave and Chancel dating back to the early 13th Century and had been considerably re-modelled since then, the most notable feature being the tower and broach spire.

== War (1939 – 1945) ==
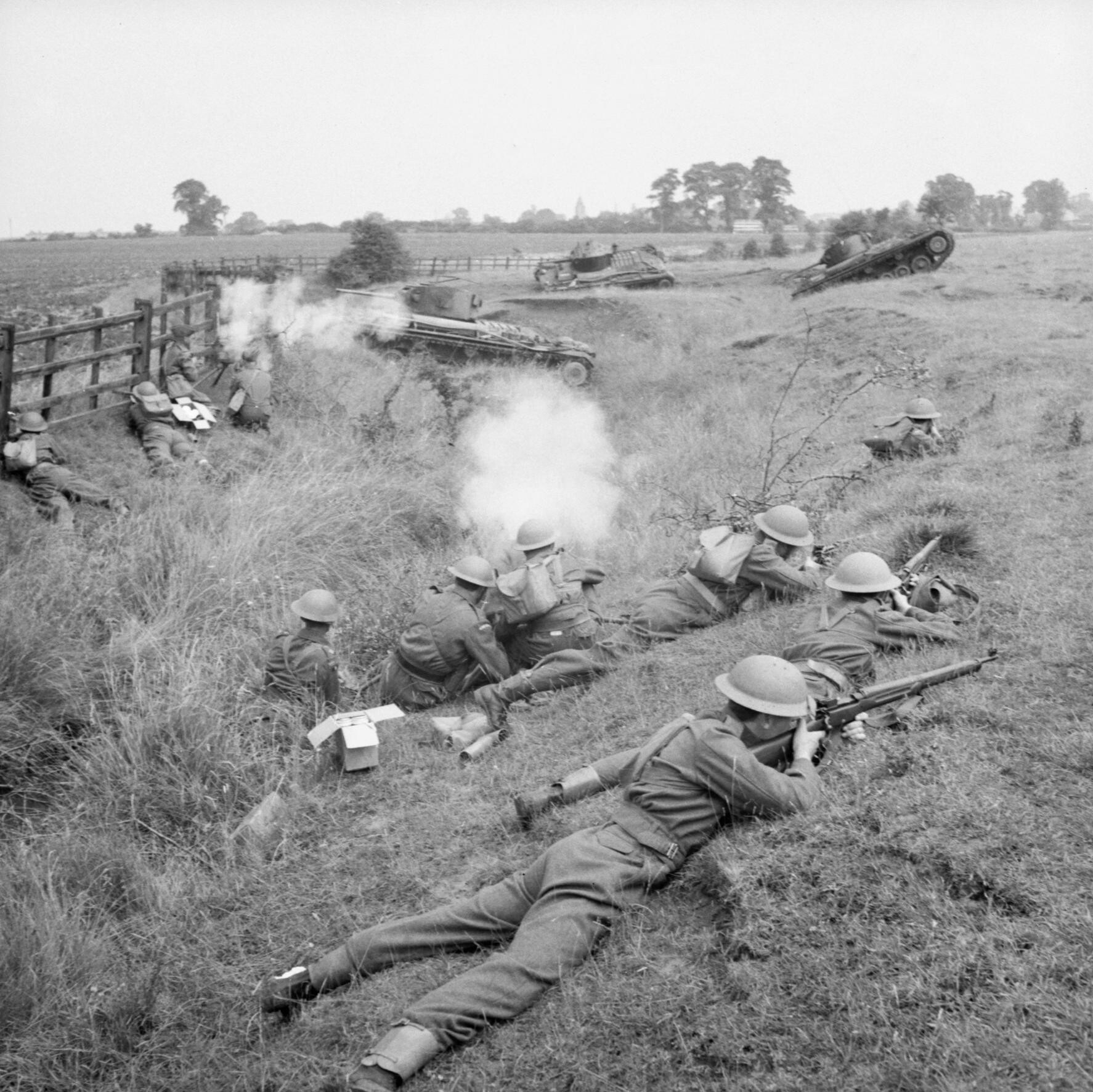
Home Guard troops 'fighting' Valentine tanks of 6th Armoured Division during large-scale manoeuvres, 27 July 1941.

The village was close to Chelveston Aerodrome, which was originally built with three runways in 1941. An Airborne Forces Experimental Establishment detachment began flying from the aerodrome in 1942 with Horsa gliders towed by Short Stirling aircraft. Later in 1942, following the entry of the United States into the war, it eventually became the home of the United States Army Air Forces 305th Bombardment Group, which had four squadrons of Boeing B-17 Flying Fortresses pioneering the daylight formation and bombing procedures of the time. There were almost 2,000 personnel based at the aerodrome flying a total of 337 missions between November 1942 and April 1945. During these missions, a total of 22,362 tons of bombs were dropped on enemy targets and 332 enemy aircraft were claimed shot down at the expense of 154 Allied aircraft and 810 men.

During the aerodrome's construction, a series of buildings were erected in the village near the church as quarters for the Women's Auxiliary Air Force (WAAF) but instead became the sergeant's mess for the Americans. In more recent times these buildings, known locally as "the camps," fell into ruin and were demolished to make way for a new housing development. Today Philips Medows, Stanbrook Way and Forge Gardens stand on these sites.

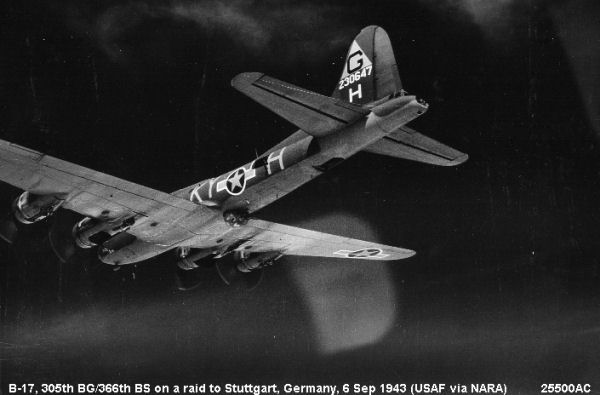
Boeing B-17F-115-BO Flying Fortress Serial 42-30647 of the US Army Air Forces 366th Bombardment Squadron on a mission to Stuttgart, Germany, on 6 September 1943. On 23 September 1943, this aircraft crashed at Chevelston returning from a mission, killing all on board

On 24 March 1944 a Boeing B-17G Flying Fortress bomber belonging to the US Army Air Force's 422nd Bomb Squadron, 305th Bomb Group (Heavy), crashed on takeoff from RAF Chelveston, killing the entire crew of 10 and 11 persons on the ground. Today Forge Gardens stands on the crash site. In May 2009 a service was held in the village church and a tablet recording the names of those who died in the crash was dedicated. Two children, Keith (aged 14) and Monica (aged 4), were killed during the crash when the aircraft hit the house they were sleeping in. The remainder of those who died consisted of servicemen who were sleeping in a barrack block which the aircraft hit and the crew of the bomber. It is said that at certain times of the year the distant drone of a B-17 can be heard in the early dawn hours, and there are also various sightings of ghostly airmen seen around the church yard and near to the crash site.

== Notable figures ==
In June 1943, as Yielden had a depleted population, an American air-force pilot named Dick Rodgers assisted in the administration and running of the town's noted Strawberry Fayre. During his short stay there, Rodgers became a very popular figure within the community. He encouraged his fellow USAAF pilots to volunteer and raise funds for the local church during their time at the Yielden airbase. He died while completing a supply drop during the Battle of the Bulge. His body was never recovered and there is a commemorative plaque on a bench outside the Western gate of the Church.

Joe Ekins (1923 – 2012), tank gunner, credited by some with killing German tank Commander Michael Wittmann, was born in Yielden.

== Name spelling ==
The village name has evolved over the centuries. The earliest recorded version was 'Giveldene' in 1086 and since then there have been over 20 changes. At one stage (circa 1390) it was recorded as being 'Yelden' before becoming known as Yeveldene in 1461. Other names include Chivelden, Gyueldene, Yueldene, Yealdon, Evelden, Yeveldene, Yielding and Yeilden. Finally it was recorded as being 'Yelden' again in 1830 with the latest variant 'Yielden' having arrived in more recent times.

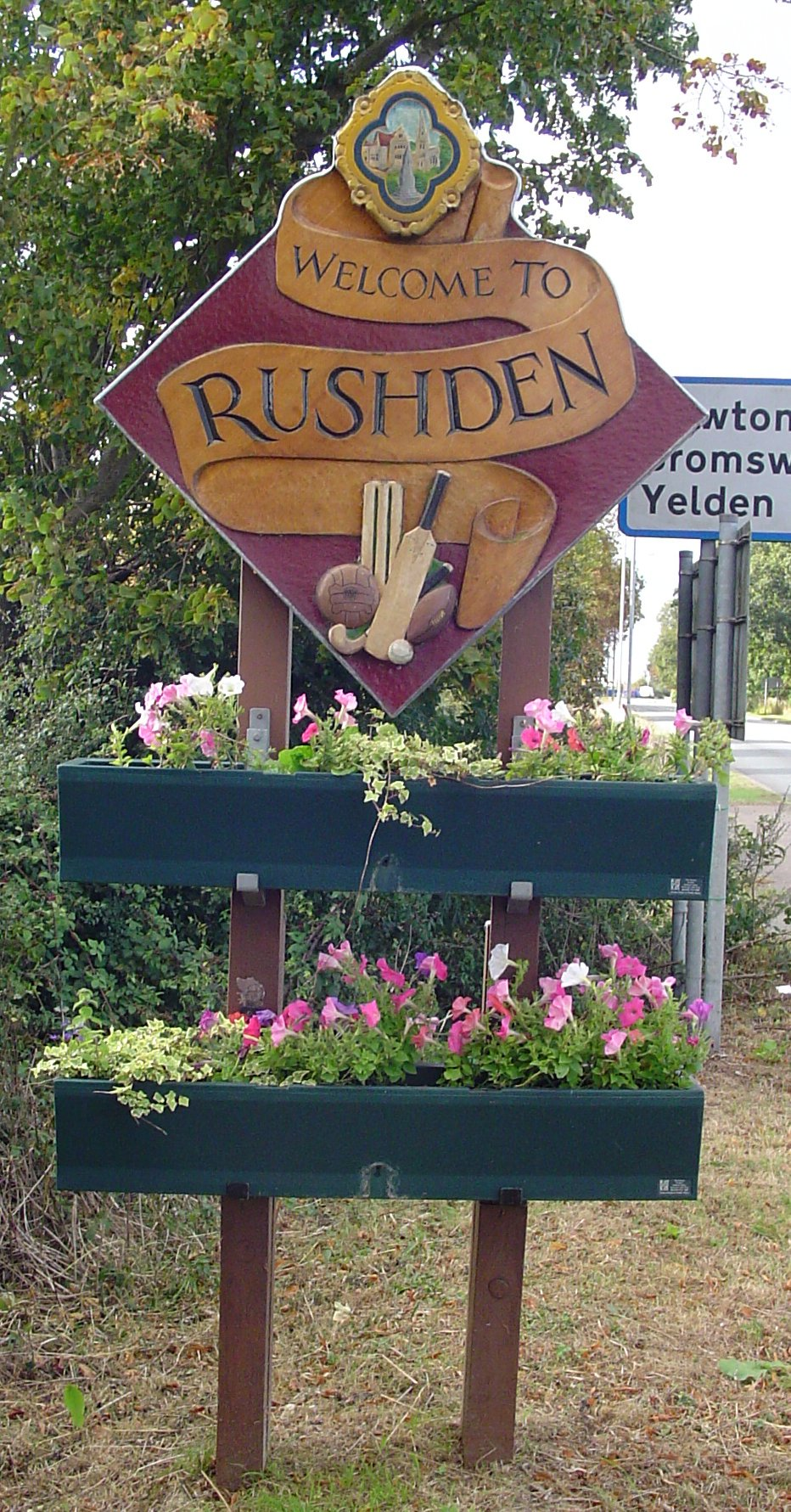
The "Yelden" spelling used on a signpost in Rushden

The name of the village is spelt differently on sign posts depending on the direction of approach:

- Yelden
- Yielden
- Yeldon

As a result of this variation and of argument over the correct spelling, a questionnaire on the subject was circulated to villagers in 1998. 44 considered the village to be called 'Yelden', while 30 considered it to be called 'Yielden'. Different organisations take different positions on the spelling: the Royal Mail uses the spelling "Yielden" in official postal addresses; and the parish council calls itself "Melchbourne and Yelden" parish council; the Office for National Statistics records the official name of the parish as "Melchbourne and Yielden"; whilst the Ordnance Survey labels the village itself 'Yelden', but records the parish name as "Melchbourne and Yielden".

In 2025 Bedford Borough Council decided on the official spelling 'Yelden'.

== Modern day ==
=== Social scene ===
Yelden is known for its Strawberry Fayre, which is held on the last Sunday in June each year. This generally attracts thousands of visitors to the village to sample oysters and champagne, strawberry teas, live jazz, classic cars, bikes and tractors and traditional summer fete activities to raise funds for the church.

=== Village pub ===
The Chequers Inn closed in 2016. Whilst there were attempts to reopen it tied with some development of land behind the pub, the building was subsequently demolished and replaced with a private dwelling.
