= Swineshead, Bedfordshire =

Village in Bedfordshire, England

Coordinates: 52.28055°N 0.4513°W

Swineshead
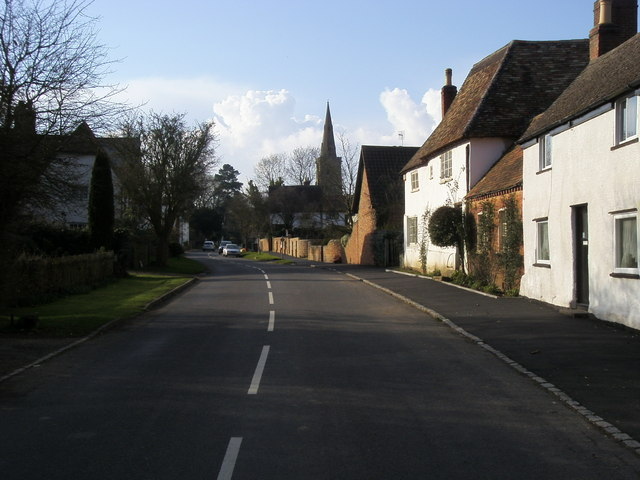

- Location within Bedfordshire
- Population: 122 (2011 Census)
- OS grid reference: TL057658
- Unitary authority: Bedford
- Ceremonial county: Bedfordshire
- Region: East
- Country: England
- Sovereign state: United Kingdom
- Post town: BEDFORD
- Postcode district: MK44
- Dialling code: 01234
- Police: Bedfordshire
- Fire: Bedfordshire
- Ambulance: East of England
- UK Parliament: North Bedfordshire

Swineshead is a village and civil parish in the Borough of Bedford in the county of Bedfordshire, England.

== History ==
The parish of Swineshead is recorded as Suineshefet (1086), Swynesheved (13th century), Swineshead (16th century). It was an exclave of the county of Huntingdonshire, and surrounded by Bedfordshire, until 30 September 1896, when it was transferred to Bedfordshire. The parish was an exclave because it was within the great manor of Kimbolton, once the property of Harold, the last Saxon king of England, and part of this manor was held to be in Huntingdonshire though separated from the rest of the county by about half a mile at the nearest point. Thus although King Harold's lands were granted to different persons by William the Conqueror, Swineshead and Stonely both passed to Fitz-Piers and both remained in the county of Huntingdonshire. At the time of the Domesday survey, land in Kimbolton and in Swineshead was held by William de Warenne, and his influence may have been used to keep his property in the same county.

Swineshead was enclosed by Act of Parliament in 1803.

The parish was part of Eaton Socon Rural District from 1894 to 1934, then became part of Bedford Rural District until 1974.

== Geography ==
The soil in the parish is loam and gravelly and the sub-soil mainly blue galt. The chief crops are wheat, barley beans, and peas. The surface is undulating and is between 139 and 236 feet (42 and 72 m) above sea-level. The village itself stands at about 155 feet (47 m). The parish was once well wooded, Swineshead and Spanoak Woods in the north of the parish still remain but now are not as large as they once were. They are owned by the Woodland Trust and Swineshead Wood is a Site of Special Scientific Interest.

== Religious sites ==
The Church of St Nicholas consists of a chancel, nave, north aisle with vestry, south aisle, west tower and south porch. The walls are coursed rubble with some pebble rubble, and with stone dressings. The roofs are covered with stone slates, tiles and lead.

The church is not mentioned in the Domesday survey of 1086, but there was a rector here before 1271. The whole church seems to have been rebuilt during the 14th century, beginning with the chancel about 1330; about the same time, the south aisle and porch were built. The north aisle with the base of a tower at its west end followed about 10 years later, but the proposed tower was almost immediately abandoned in favour of one at the west end of the nave.

Towards the end of the 15th century, a clerestory was added to the nave, a vestry was added at the east end of the north aisle, with a chamber above it, and a narrow slipway communicating with the chancel. At the same time the chancel arch was widened, rood-stairs built on the south side, and a rood-screen and loft erected.

The nave roof was repaired in 1706 and in 1841. A general restoration seems to have occurred from 1847 to 1853. The tower and spire were again repaired in 1907.

== Landmarks ==
The village is in the middle of the parish, and includes many old houses. The "Three Horseshoes" Inn, now private house, dates from the early 17th century. The cottages are of brick and timber with tiled and thatched roofs. The former rectory, now used as a farmhouse, is an ancient plastered building of brick and timber opposite the church. When it was undergoing restoration in 1846, a copy of the Solemn League and Covenant (signed by the then Rector of Swineshead) was discovered in the roof where it was perhaps hidden by the cautious rector of the time. There are the traces of two moats in the village.

== Demography ==
- Population in 1801 – 214.
- Population in 1851 – 267.
- Population in 1901 – 160.
- Population in 1951 – 115.
- Population in 1971 – 116.
- Population in 1991 – 137.

The parish of Swineshead was in the St Neots Union for Poor Law administration. The parish occupies 1,353.5 acres (5.477 km^{2}) of land.
