= Clockmakers' Museum =

Museum of the Clockmakers' Company

Coordinates: 51.4975°N 0.174722°W

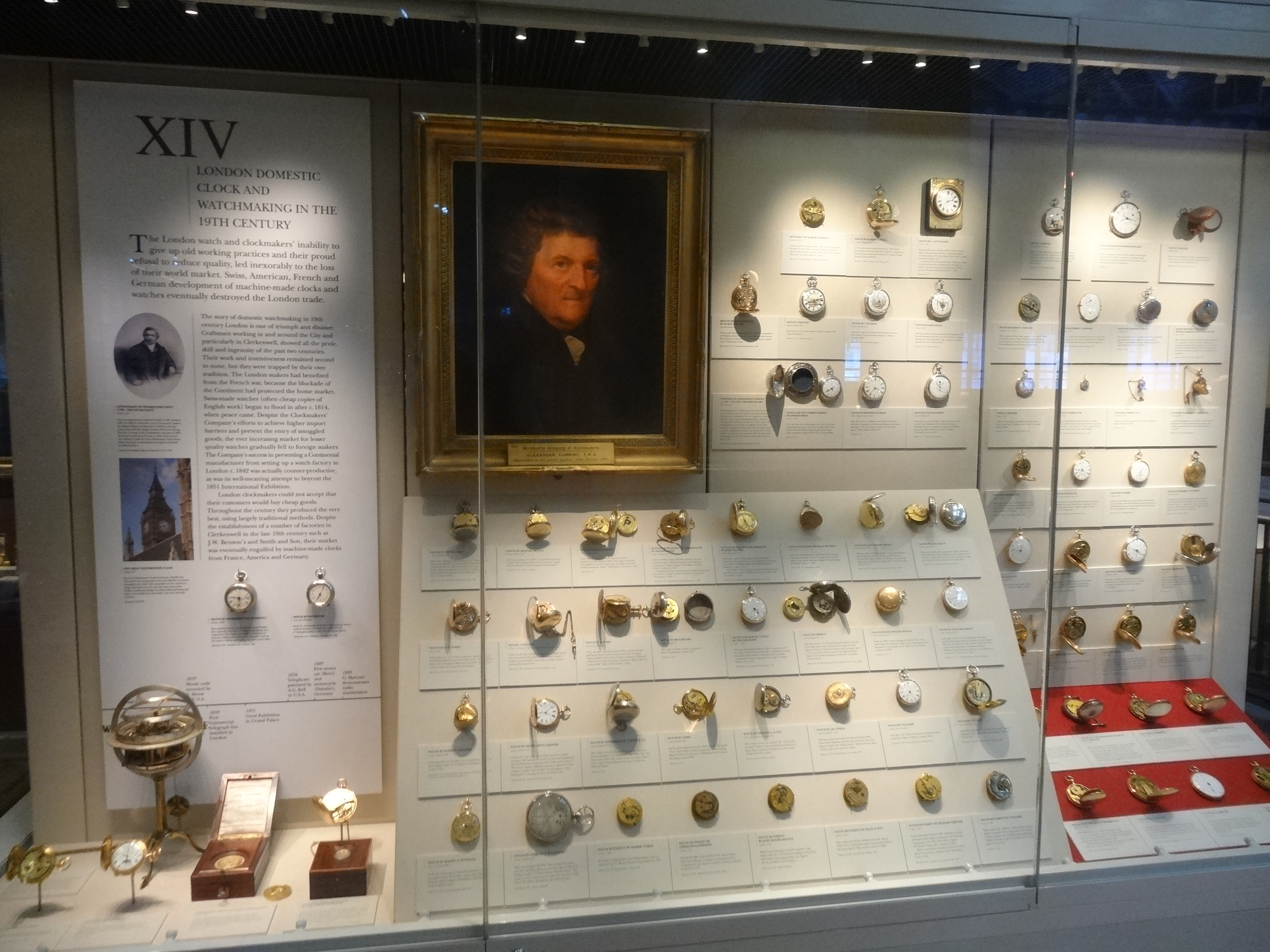
- A display of 19th century domestic watchmaking, at the Clockmakers' Museum

- Location within Central London
- Established: 1814; 212 years ago
- Location: Science Museum, London
- Accreditation: Arts Council England
- Collections: Emphasis on horology in London, 17th century to date
- Curator: Anna Rolls
- Website: "Clockmakers Museum".

The Clockmakers' Museum in London, England, is believed to be the oldest collection specifically of clocks and watches in the world. The collection belongs to and is administered by the Clockmakers’ Charity, affiliated to the Worshipful Company of Clockmakers, founded in 1631 by Royal Charter. Since 2015 it has been housed in a gallery provided by the Science Museum in South Kensington, having formerly been located in the Guildhall complex in the City of London since 1874, where it first opened to the public. Admission is free.

The formation of the collection dates back to 1814. The principal goal of the museum is to educate the public about the history of the field of clock and watchmaking (horology), principally in the City of London, and also to promote education and career possibilities in the craft of horology, which as of 2019 was placed on the HCA Red List of Endangered Crafts. The Archive of the Clockmakers is managed on its behalf by the London Metropolitan Archive and is located at Guildhall Library, where the Library collection of printed books is also held and managed.

== History ==
The Clockmakers Company first established a library collection in 1814, under the control of a library committee, in which Benjamin Lewis Vulliamy soon emerged as the most prominent figure, remaining so for several decades. Early meetings were held at Vulliamy's premises in Pall Mall, London but in 1817 the Company acquired a mahogany bureau and bookcase from Gillows of Lancaster and London, to house its growing collection, and this was established in an upper room in the Kings Head Tavern in Poultry, London, where the Company had its meetings from 1802 to 1851. From 1815, the collection had expanded from books to include horological exhibits, among which an early acquisition was a set of pallets from an escapement by Alexander Cumming, bought by Vulliamy at auction, and which are still on display, on the Gillows bookcase.

With the deaths of BL Vulliamy and George Atkins, Clerk to the Company, in the 1850s, the collection lost its key advocates and supporters, but the fortunes of the museum were reversed with the construction of a new building for Guildhall Library in the early 1870s. At the invitation of the Guildhall authorities, the Clockmakers’ Museum was moved there and opened to the public from 1873. A first catalogue was written by William Henry Overall in 1875. In 1891, The Rev Harry Leonard Nelthropp, a key supporter of the museum, persuaded the Company to acquire one of the most important items in the modern collection, John Harrison’s fifth marine timekeeper, H5. In 1894, Nelthropp donated his entire personal collection of watches, clocks, sundials, seals and related ephemera to the Museum. Charles Welch produced a new catalogue in 1902.

In 1936, the Clockmakers asked the noted engineer and horologist Granville Hugh Baillie to create a new catalogue. Baillie rearranged the museum between mid-1937 and mid-1938. During the Second World War the collection was dismantled and stored off-site under the guidance of Guildhall Librarian James Lungley Douthwaite. Baillie produced a guide in 1939 and updated the catalogue in 1949.

The museum moved to the new Guildhall Library in 1976, and, in anticipation, Cecil Clutton and George Daniels produced a new catalogue of the clock and watch collection, while John Bromley, a Guildhall Librarian, produced a new catalogue of the Library collection.

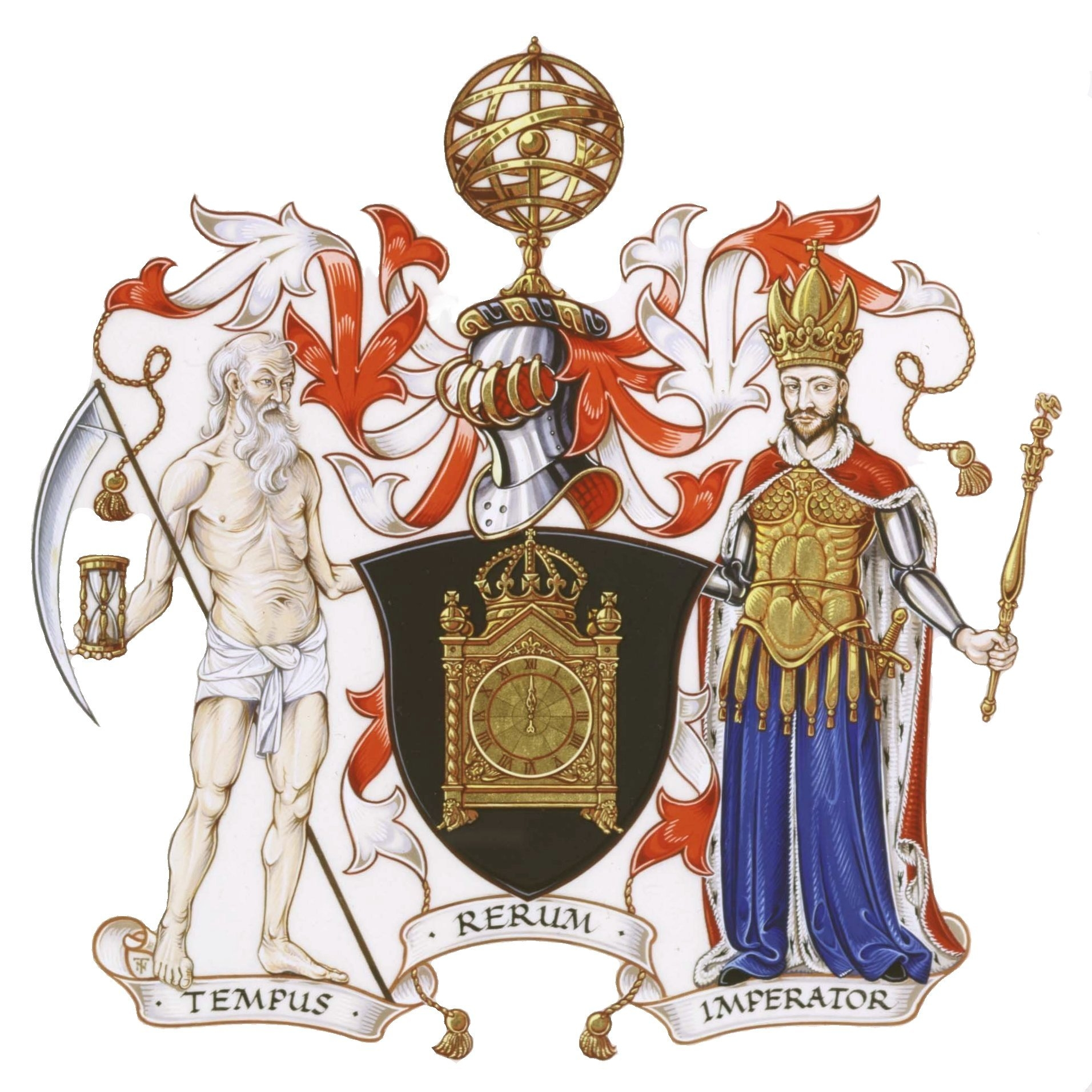
Arms of the Clockmakers' Company, granted in 1672

Under Cedric Jagger as Assistant Curator from 1974, and then as Keeper from 1980, the Museum underwent significant reorganization and improvement at Guildhall. Jagger was succeeded as Keeper by Sir George White in 1988, who served for thirty years through to 2018, in which time the museum and archive collection was again expanded. The major acquisitions in the late twentieth and early twenty-first century were the Hurle-Bath and Hurle-Bradley watch collections, and the purchase of a significant cache of original John Harrison manuscript documents. With a major bequest by noted collector and Past-Master of the Company Reginald Gowan Beloe TD, the funds were available for a major rebuild of the museum, which reopened with a new and enlarged display organized by White at Guildhall Library in 2001. When its lease finally expired at Guildhall, White was instrumental in securing the offer by Ian Blatchford of a newly designed gallery at the Science Museum, which it now occupies under a thirty-year lease. The collection was moved over the course of 2014–15, and the new gallery was opened by the Princess Royal on 22 October 2015. The new gallery is more than twice the size of the earlier gallery at Guildhall. Visitor numbers in the decade prior to 2014 were of the order of 13,000 per annum, but since the move to the Science Museum numbers have expanded significantly, in view of the more than 3 million visitors to the London Science Museum site each year.

The move of the Clockmakers Museum to the Science Museum formed part of the updating and improvement of the Science Museum second floor galleries, where it adjoins the Mathematics Gallery (designed by Zaha Hadid Architects, opened 2016) and Science City: 1500–1800 (designed by Gitta Gschwendtner, opened 2019).

== Library and archive ==
Though the Museum has moved to South Kensington, the Library and Archive of the Clockmakers remains housed in the City of London, almost entirely at Guildhall Library, and open to the public (though material has to be requested from the store, and is not on open access). The presence of the Clockmakers' Library of printed books, alongside the library of the Antiquarian Horological Society contributes to making Guildhall Library a world-class centre for horological research resources.

Printed books can be searched for using the Guildhall Library catalogue here.

For genealogical and biographical research about watch and clockmakers, the Clockmakers' archives (catalogue here) include:

- Apprentice bindings, 1694–1890
- Freedom admissions, 1631–1947
- Quarterage books, 1698–1850 (with gaps). These records can indicate a period of activity and sometimes the date of death.
- Court minutes, 1632–1992. The minutes can include promotions to the livery, elections to the Court of Assistants and to offices, and requests for charitable assistance by members and their dependents.

== The collection ==
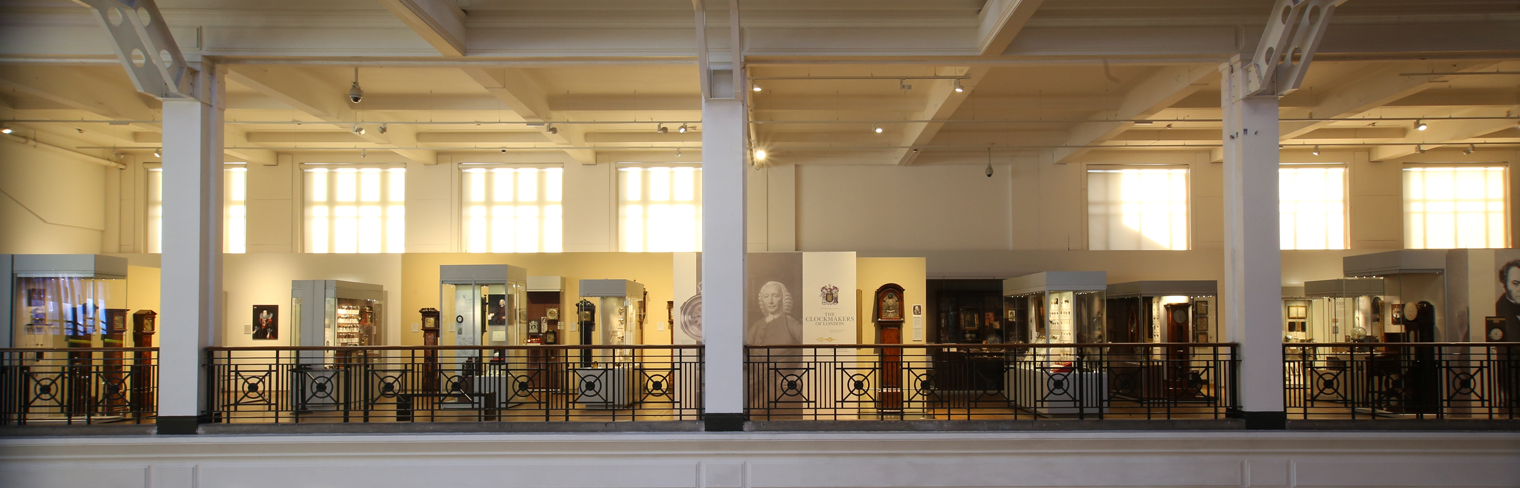
The Clockmakers Museum displays in the London Science Museum

The collection on display includes rare horological portraits, and numbers some 660 English and European watches, 30 clocks, and 15 marine timekeepers, which are broadly arranged in chronological order, starting in the fifteenth and sixteenth centuries at the east end (with some European objects), but soon moving to the seventeenth century and the emergence of a clock and watch trade in London, initially populated by immigrant craftsmen. The gallery moves forward in time as it progresses westwards through the eighteenth and nineteenth centuries and is completed at the west end by recent and current objects, such as watches made by and other items associated with George Daniels, a former Master of the Company, and an explanation of the wristwatch now being manufactured by Charles Frodsham in Sussex. To support horological education, the museum has an information board at the west end, emphasizing the possibilities for new students and entrants to the field of horology, particularly at West Dean College, Birmingham School of Jewellery, part of Birmingham City University, and the British School of Watchmaking.

The chronological story set out in the gallery in information panels and labelling has been resolved into a single narrative account, The Clockmakers of London, by the Keeper Emeritus, George White, first published in 2000 and since revised in a new edition with high-resolution images (2018).

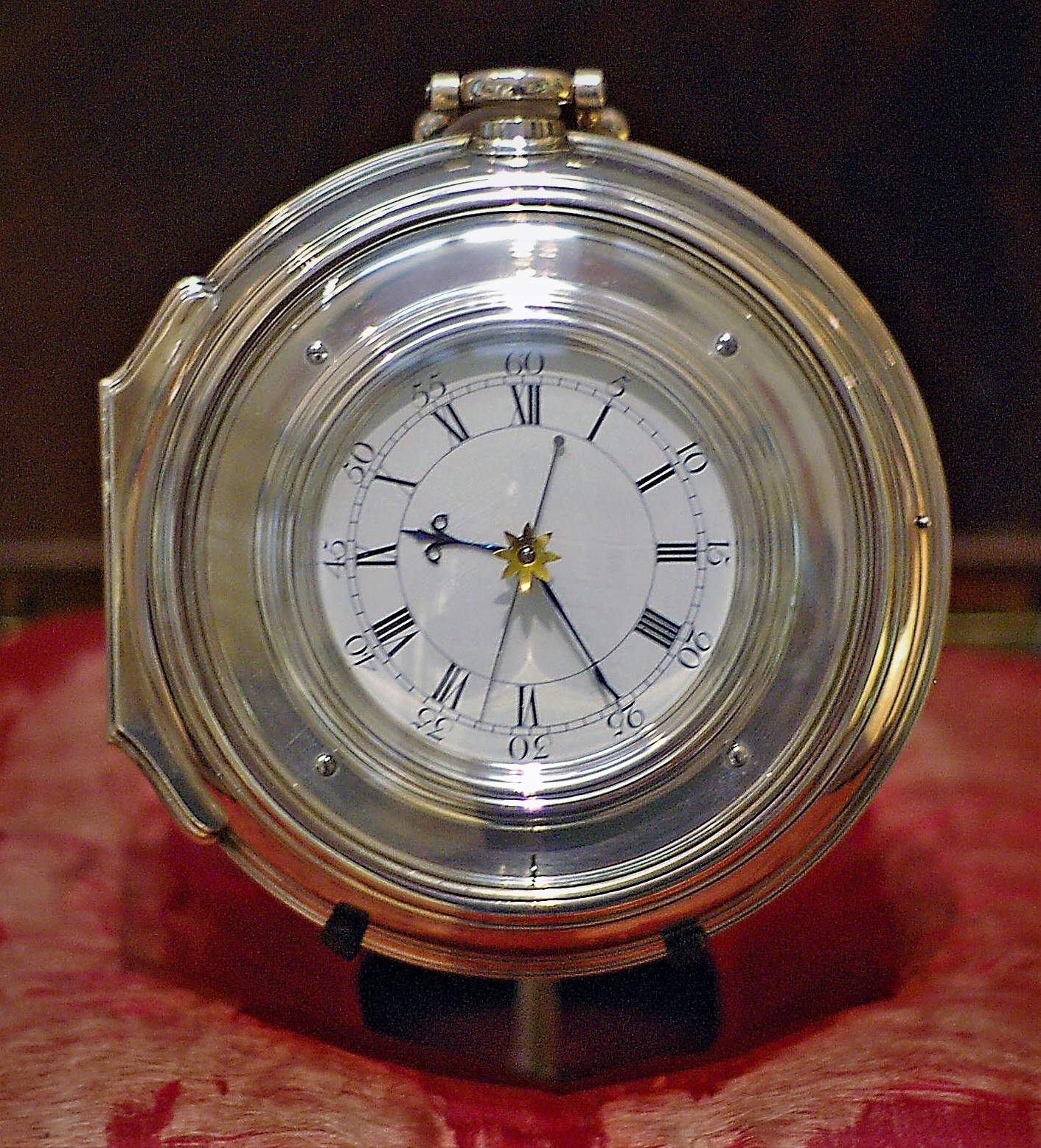
John Harrison's H5 marine timekeeper

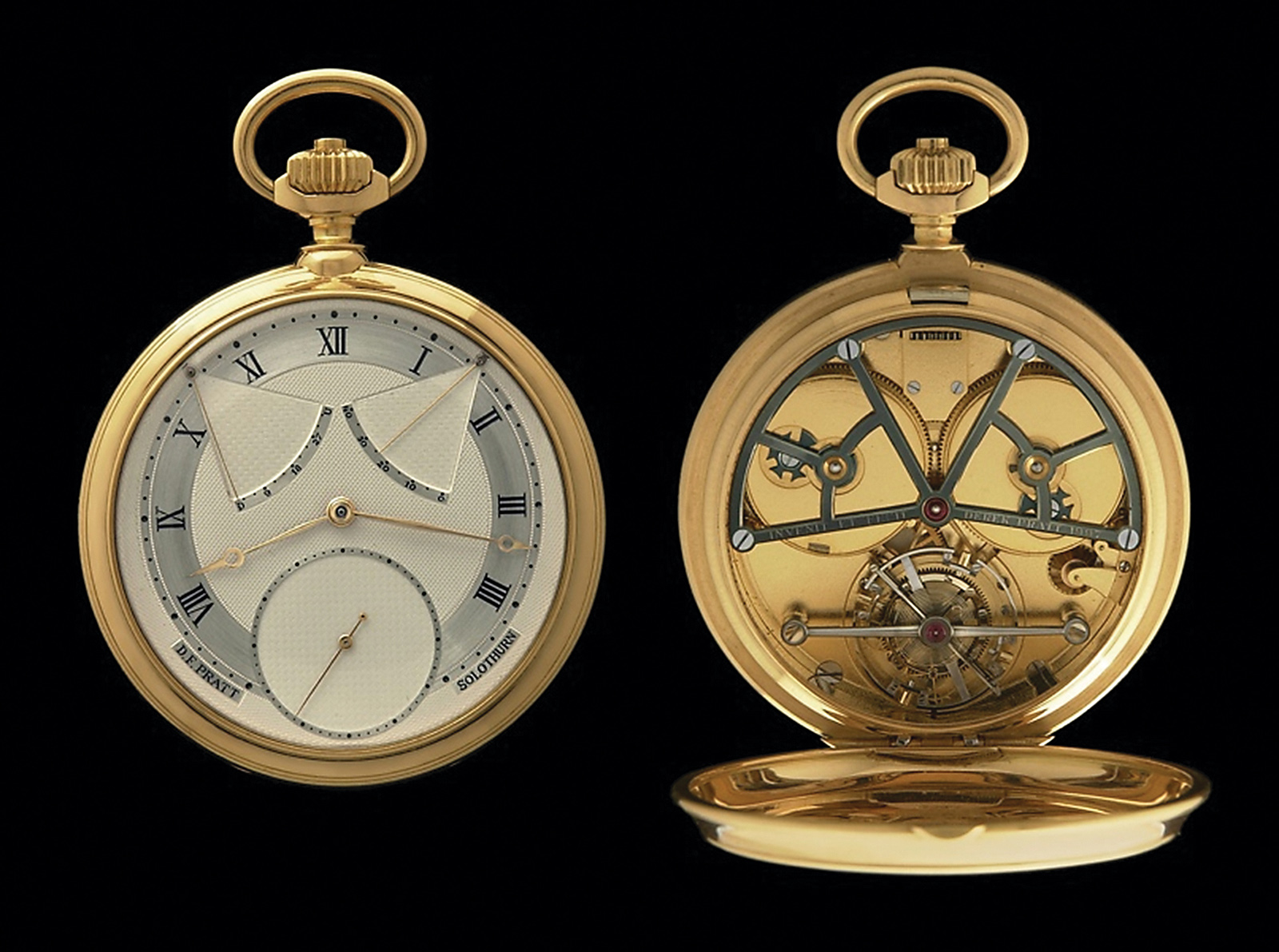
Derek Pratt's Double-Wheel Remontoir Tourbillon, 1997.

Highlights include:

- Star watch by David Ramsay
- Clocks and watches by Edward East
- Table clock by Samuel Knibb
- Astronomical table clock by Samuel Watson, possibly belonging to Isaac Newton
- Clocks and watches by Thomas Tompion
- Watches and clocks by George Graham
- Marine timekeeper by Henry Sully
- Longcase clock by James Harrison
- Longcase movements by John Harrison
- Watch by John Jefferys, made for John Harrison, and on long-term loan to the Museum
- John Harrison’s H5 marine timekeeper
- Chronometers by John Arnold, and significant personal Arnold ephemera
- Chronometers by Thomas Earnshaw
- Watches by Abraham-Louis Breguet
- Smiths wristwatch worn by Sir Edmund Hillary to the summit of Mount Everest
- Watches by George Daniels, including the Space Traveller (on loan to the Museum)
- Derek Pratt's 1997 Double-Wheel Remontoir Tourbillon (on loan)
- Original portraits of many eminent clock and watchmakers

In 2019 the museum acquired a large portrait (970mm x 800mm) in a silvered frame, showing a well-dressed gentleman holding a fine and complicated watch, dated perhaps to the 1670s. The watch is very similar to the astronomical watch, c.1660, by Nathaniel Barrow, shown in Case 7 in the museum.

== Accreditation ==
The Museum was first admitted to the Registration scheme of the Museums, Libraries and Archives Council. When this was amended to Accreditation, the Museum was invited to re-register, and achieved full accredited status in 2007. After suspending accredited status while the Museum closed for its move to South Kensington, it then reapplied once the museum reopened and was granted full Accredited status by Arts Council England in 2018.

== Significant staff ==
Over time a number of Guildhall Librarians have served as Honorary Librarians and Curators to the Clockmakers’ Company.

- Charles Atkins – Collections Committee
- William Henry Overall – Guildhall Librarian
- Reverend Henry Nelthropp – Collections Committee
- Charles Welch – Librarian and Curator (1889-1907)
- Edward Marto Borraio – Librarian and Curator (1908)
- Bernard Kettle – Librarian and Curator (1910-1926)
- Granville Hugh Baillie – Collections Committee
- James Lungley Douthwaite – Librarian and Curator (1926–1943)
- Raymond Smith – Librarian and Curator (1943-1956)
- Courtenay Adrian Ilbert - Curator (whose remarkable collection forms a core element of the horology collection of the British Museum), Collections Committee)
- Arthur Herbert Hall – Librarian and Curator (1956–1966)
- Godfrey Thompson – Librarian and Curator (1966-1984)
- Colonel Humphrey Quill – Honorary Surveyor of the Collection
- George Daniels – Assistant Honorary Surveyor of the Collection
- Cedric Sergeant Jagger – Assistant Curator (1974–1979), Keeper (1980–1988)
- Sir George White – Keeper (1988–2018)
- Anna Rolls – Curator (2018-date)
