= Joseph Windmills =

English clockmaker (c.1640–1724)

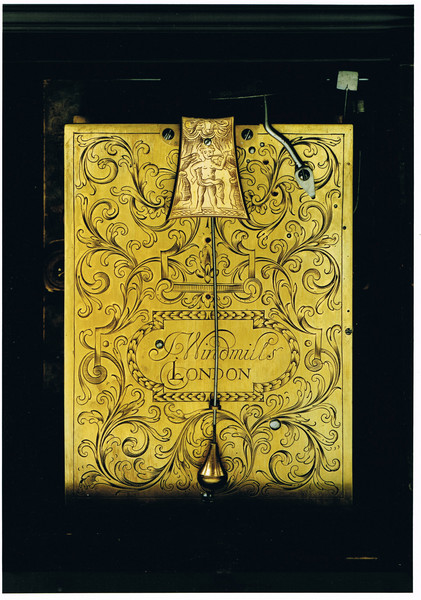
Backplate of bracket clock by Joseph Windmills

Joseph Windmills (c.1640 – 1724), was an eminent London watch- and clockmaker who, with his son Thomas, produced outstanding timepieces between 1671 and 1737.

Joseph was born around 1640/1650 and his origins are uncertain. In his first years as clockmaker, his workshop was located in St Martin's Le Grand in London, and his house was in Blow Bladder Street, before moving to Mark Lane End in Tower Street in 1687. In 1699 he was elected as the youngest Warden of the Clockmakers' Company, and sat on committees alongside Thomas Tompion, preceding him as Master of the Company in 1702, as well as alongside Charles Gretton (Master of the Company in 1700). His son Thomas completed his apprenticeship, subsequently working as a journeyman, and free of the Clockmakers' Company in about 1695. Thomas also served as Master of the Company, in 1718. The partnership J & T Windmills also took over Thomas Tompion's clock maintenance contract at the Tower of London and at Woolwich and other Crown contracts.

Windmills was regarded as one of the finest clockmakers in seventeenth-century London, producing a large number of lantern clocks, bracket clocks, longcase clocks and pocket watches. His earliest watch, displayed in the British Museum, was made before 1680 and did not make use of a balance spring. Thomas Tompion's sprung balance transformed the pocket watch from ornamental item into an accurate timepiece. Joseph's last recorded attendance at the Court of the Clockmakers' Company was on 24 October 1723, ending a membership of more than thirty-two years. He died in 1724, having spent fifty-two years at his trade. Thomas then ran the company until his death in 1737. Thomas died childless and thus was the last of the Windmills' male line.

The name "J & T Windmills" is currently used by a watchmaker with no links to the original father-and-son team.

== Bibliography ==
- Neale, J.A.: "Joseph and Thomas Windmills Clock and Watch Makers 1671 - 1737", 1999.
