= Dingwall Beloe Lecture Series =

Horological lectures at the British Museum

Eric Dingwall
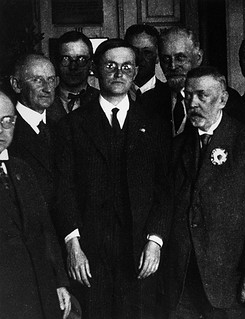
- Eric Dingwall (middle) in 1923.
- Occupations: Anthropologist, psychical researcher and librarian

The Dingwall Beloe Lecture Series is the result of bequests by Eric Dingwall, formerly an Assistant Keeper of Printed Books in the British Museum, and to the Clockmakers Company by Reginald Beloe TD, the noted horological collector and Master of the Company in 1977.

Reginald Beloe
- Reginald Beloe, Master of the Clockmakers Company in 1977.
- Occupations: Horologist and collector

== History ==
The Museum and the Company agreed the formation of a fund to back the presentation of an annual lecture, intended to make new contributions to the history of horology, with a particular international focus. The lectures, under the organization of the Clocks and Watches department of the British Museum, have become one of the most significant annual events in the international horological calendar. The inaugural lecture was in 1989.

== The lectures ==
1. 1989 Giuseppe Brusa, Museo Poldi Pezzoli, Milan, 'Early mechanical horology in Italy'
2. 1990 Joachim Schardin, Staatlich Mathematisch-Physikalischer Salon, Dresden, 'The history of the horological collections in Dresden'.
3. 1991 Anthony Turner, 'Berthoud in England, Harrison in France: the transmission of horological knowledge in 18th century Europe'.
4. 1992 Jan Jaap Haspels, Director/Curator, Museum Speelklok, Utrecht, 'The Early History of Musical Clocks'.
5. 1993 owing to the illness of K. J. Langer, Munich, who was to lecture on 'German Precision Horology After 1800', David Thompson of the British Museum gave a talk on 'The British Museum Horological Collections'.
6. 1994 Gerhard Dohrn-van Rossum, Chemnitz University of Technology, 'Public Clocks and Modern Hours - Time Measurement and Urban Life since the late Middle Ages'.
7. 1995 John Leopold, British Museum, 'The Third Seafaring Nation: The introduction of the marine chronometer in the Netherlands'.
8. 1996 Jaroslav Folta, National Technical Museum (Prague), 'Horology in Prague'.
9. 1997 Peter Friess, Deutsches Museum Bonn, 'An unknown talent of German clockmaking: Joseph Weidenheimer 1758– 1795'.
10. 1998 Günther Oestmann, University of Hamburg, 'The Strasbourg Cathedral Clock'.
11. 1999 James Dowling, London, 'Mechanical Timekeeping in the Electronic Age'.
12. 2000 William J. H. Andrewes, Concord, Massachusetts 'French Clocks in American Collections'.
13. 2001 Mikhail Gouriev, Hermitage Museum, St. Petersburg, 'Clocks and Watches in the Hermitage'.
14. 2002 Jonathan Betts, National Maritime Museum, 'John Hyacinth Magellan (1720– 1790), horological and scientific agent'.
15. 2003 Sir George White, Worshipful Company of Clockmakers, Jeremy Evans, The British Museum, 'Thomas Tompion 'at The Dial and Three Crowns' '.
16. 2004 David Penney, 'Evidence from the Transient: The Importance of Ephemera for a Proper Understanding of the Clock and Watch Making Trade'.
17. 2005 Professor Carlos R. Alba, Autonomous University of Madrid (collector) & Juan J. Ontalva (clockmaker), 'Spain's Magnificent Horological Collections: An English and French Heritage'.
18. 2006 Roger Smith, 'The Sing-SongTrade: Exporting Clocks to China in the Eighteenth Century'.
19. 2007 Hans Boeckh, Patek-Philippe Museum, Geneva, 'French Literary Themes on 17th-Century Watches'.
20. 2008 Paul Buck, British Museum, 'Courtenay Adrian Ilbert (1888–1956), Horological Collector'.
21. 2009 John Glanville, 'Made in England – House clock production in the 20th century'.
22. 2010 Eddy Fraiture and Paul van Rompay (Belgian Horological Society), 'Clock & Watch Making in Flanders 1300–1830'.
23. 2011 Michael Grange, Cheltenham, 'The Grange Collection at the British Museum. English Provincial Clockmaking 1695–1840. The Role of the Thirty-Hour Clock'.
24. 2012 Alice Arnold-Becker, 'Friedberg – a centre of watch and clock making in 17th and 18th century Bavaria'.
25. 2013 Eduard C. Saluz, Deutsches Uhrenmuseum, 'The German Clock Museum Furtwangen – 160 Years of collecting'.
26. 2014 Andrew King, 'Winner or loser. Did John Harrison win the Longitude Prize?'
27. 2015 James Nye, Chairman AHS, An Englishman, a Frenchman, and a Watchman—The Cross-Border Life of Robert Lenoir (1898–1979) (available on YouTube)
28. 2016 Sibylle Gluch, 'Timing the stars: astronomers, clockmakers and German precision horology around 1800'
29. 2017 Matthew Champion, 'The music of the clock, c.1300–c.1600'
30. 2018 Marisa Addomine, 'Heavenly advisors: the astrological purpose of public clocks in Italy'
31. 2019 Sebastian Whitestone, 'Revelation in revision. How alterations to a woodcut block change the history of Huygens' pendulum clock invention'
32. 2020 Owing to COVID-19 restrictions, the lecture was combined with the annual Harrison Lecture of the Clockmakers Company and held virtually as a Zoom webinar, entitled 'Time in a Space'. There were three speakers: Joanna Migdal, 'Proportion - An Artist Craftsman's Perspective'; John Martineau, 'The Beauty of Asymmetry'; and Lee Yuen-Rapati, 'The Importance of Spacing in Clock and Watch Dial Design'. (available on YouTube)
33. 2022 Peter de Clercq, 'Travel journals and the history of horology'.
34. 2023 Keith Scobie-Youngs, 'From Man to Machine - The history of the winding of the Great Clock of Westminster'.
35. 2024 Michael Korey, 'Geared to the planets'.
36. 2025 Bob Frishman, '‘American Superiority’ at the 1851 Great Exhibition'.
