= Thomas Tompion =

English clockmaker (1639–1713)

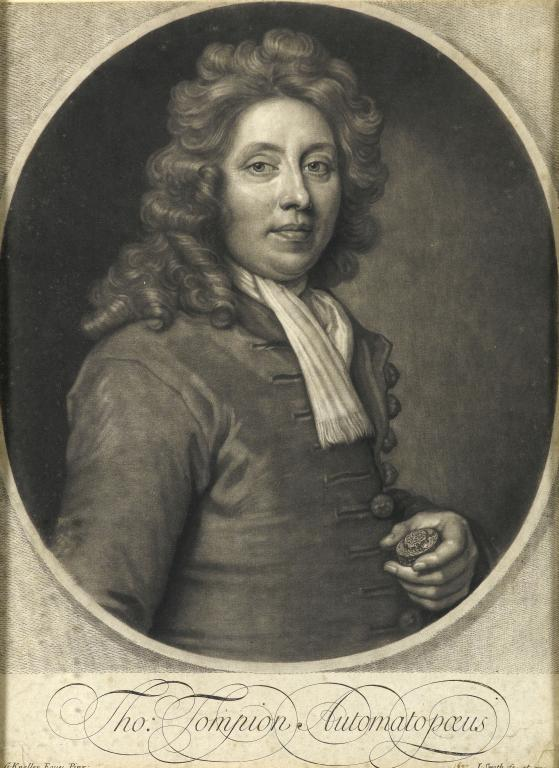
- Engraving of Thomas Tompion by John Smith, after a portrait by Sir Godfrey Kneller
- Born: 1639; Northill, Bedfordshire, England
- Died: 1713 (aged 73–74); London, England
- Occupations: Clock- and watchmaker

Thomas Tompion (1639–1713) was an English clockmaker, watchmaker and mechanician who is still regarded to this day as the "Father of English Clockmaking". Tompion's work includes some of the most historic and important clocks and watches in the world, and can command very high prices whenever outstanding examples appear at auction. A plaque commemorates the house he shared on Fleet Street in London with his equally famous pupil and successor George Graham.

== Biography ==
Thomas Tompion was born around 1639 and was baptized on 25 July 1639 in Northill, Bedfordshire, England. The family cottage in Ickwell, his home hamlet in the parish of Northill, bears a plaque erected in his honor by the Worshipful Company of Clockmakers in 1952. He was the eldest son of a blacksmith, also named Thomas Tompion, and probably worked as a blacksmith until 1664 when he became an apprentice of a London clockmaker. Very little of his earlier years is known. The first reference to Tompion in London is recorded around the end of 1670 in Water Lane (now Whitefriars Street) off Fleet Street.

His early clockmaking style shows a strong connection with Joseph Knibb. Tompion's most important early patron was the scientist Robert Hooke, who may well have known the Knibb family, as both were in Oxford. Hooke's relationship with Tompion was the key to his success, as it opened doors to royal patronage as well as giving him access to the latest technology.

Tompion's excellence was based on the sound design of his productions as well as the high quality of the materials used. This, together with the outstanding skills of the workmen he employed, gave him an unrivalled reputation throughout the known world. Many of these workmen had French and Dutch Huguenot origins, for example Daniel and Nicholas Delander, Henry Callot and Charles Molyns, the latter possibly related to the family Windmills.

Importantly, those Huguenots who worked for him in the sphere of decorative arts were able to execute Tompion's demands for the high-quality workmanship on which he founded his unrivalled reputation. Tompion was an early member of the Clockmakers' Company of London – he joined in 1671 and became a master in 1704, serving with other renowned members such as Charles Gretton, Daniel Quare, and Joseph Windmills.

When the Royal Observatory was established in 1676, King Charles II selected Tompion to create two identical clocks based on Hooke's idea of a very long pendulum swinging in a very small arc. These were fixed in the Octagon room, each was driven by a deadbeat escapement designed by Richard Towneley, with both clocks only needing to be wound once a year. They proved to be very accurate and were instrumental in achieving the correct calculations needed for astronomical observations.

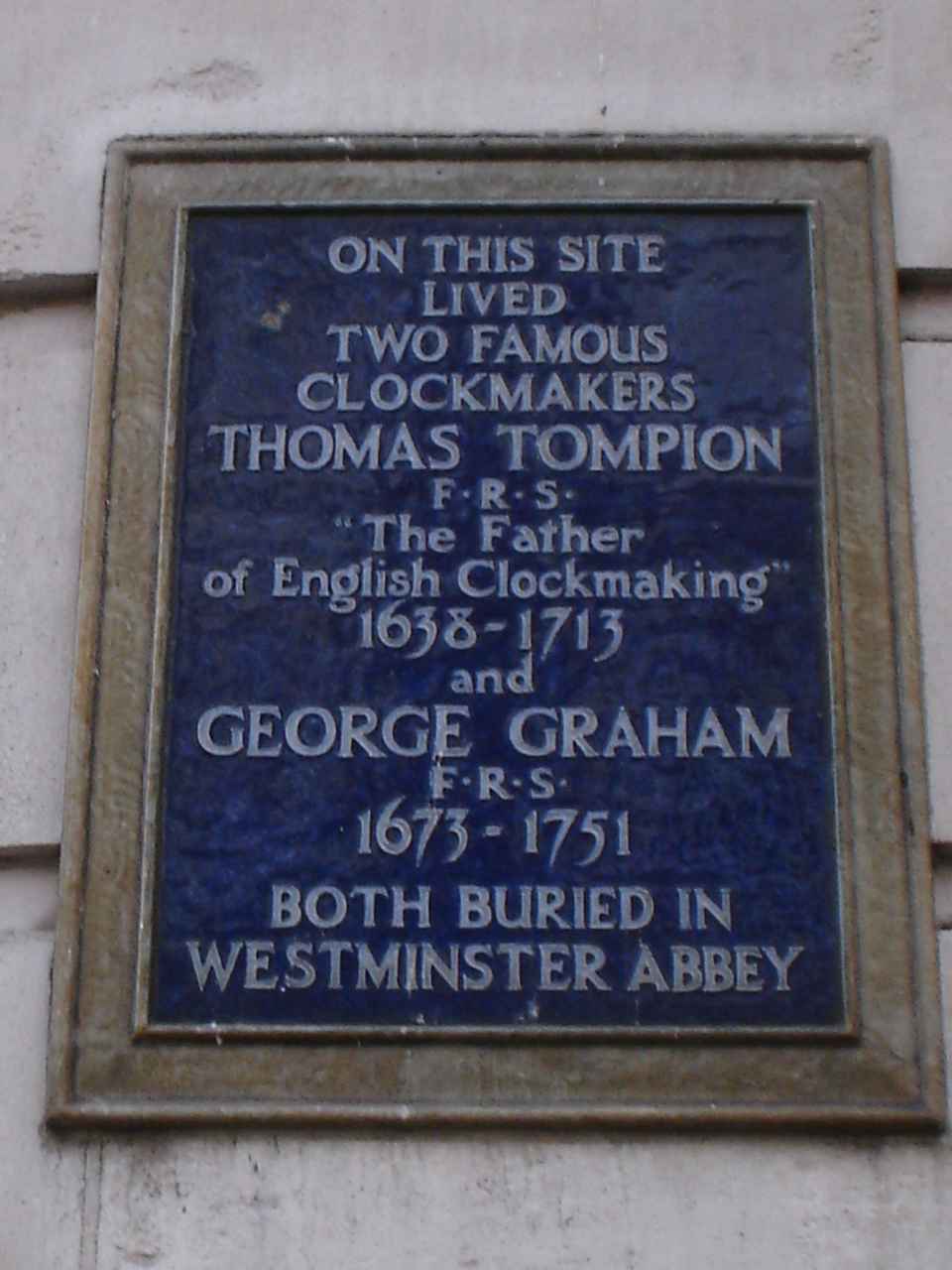
Plaque in Fleet Street, London, commemorating Thomas Tompion and George Graham

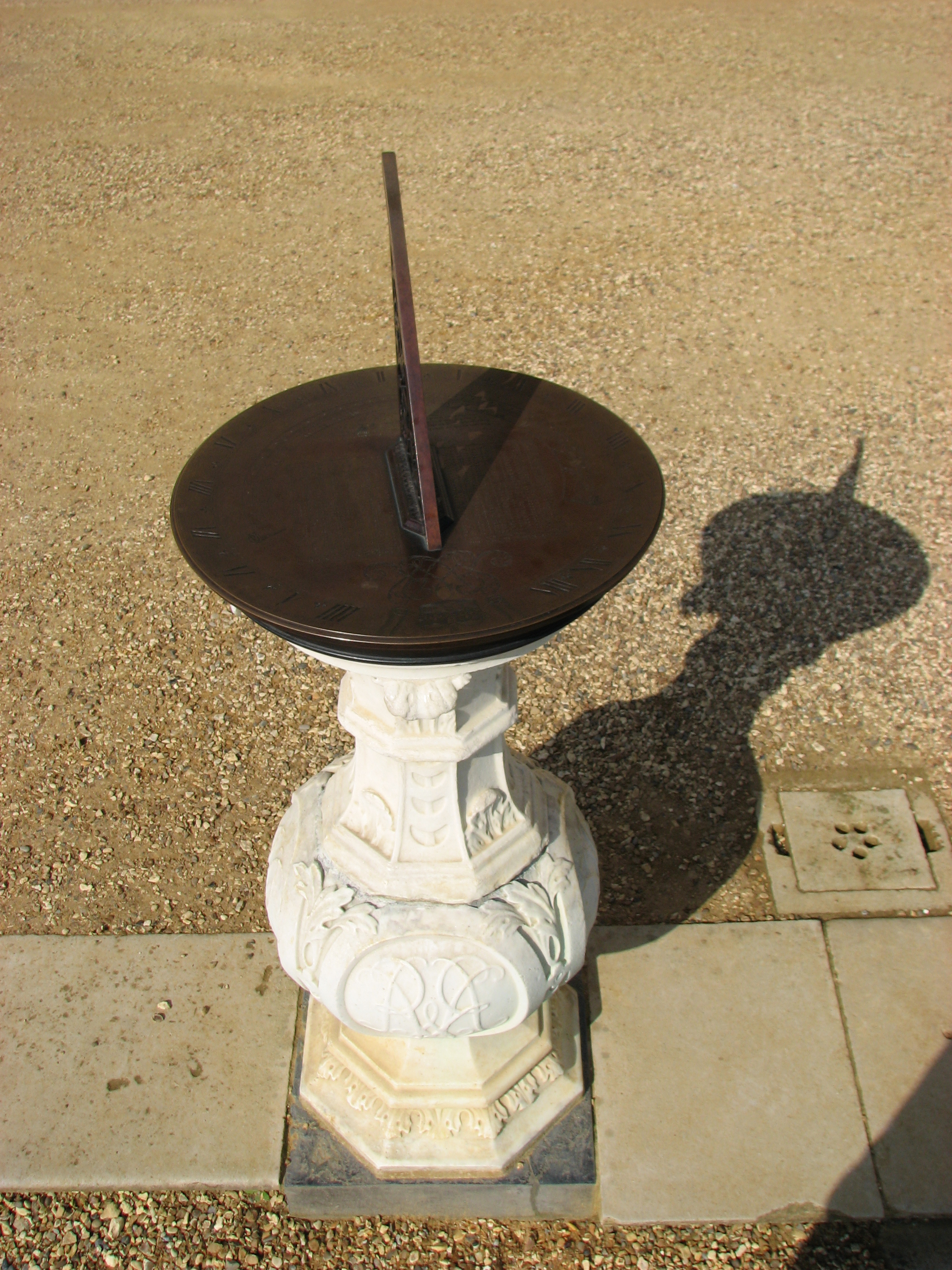
Sundial made by Thomas Tompion at Hampton Court Palace, c. 1680

Due to his relationship with the scientist Robert Hooke, he made some of the first watches with balance springs; these had the potential to be much more accurate than earlier watches. Several different kinds were experimented with, including an early type with double balances geared together in order to eliminate errors of motion. One of these was made for King Charles II and was signed "Robert Hooke invent. 1658. T. Tompion fecit, 1675". William Derham mentions this in his book The Artificial Clockmaker. This watch, it seems, has not survived. The final form of balance spring arrangement used by Tompion was a plain spiral with a single balance, indeed the same arrangement employed by Christiaan Huygens in watches made for him by Thuret. A few of Tompion's early spiral balance spring movements were also of a similar specification to the Huygens/Thuret pattern as they had a standing barrel and no fusee. Huygens imagined that the latter would not be necessary as the spiral spring would render the balance isochronous. Tompion must have soon found this rather optimistic surmise was however incorrect, as all Tompion's subsequent spiral balance spring movements have fusees, and this design became the standard pattern in English watches throughout the 17th and 18th centuries.

It is often stated that Tompion invented the particular type of balance spring regulation in pocket watches widely used until the late 19th century. This has the curb pins mounted on a sector rack, and moved by a pinion on which is mounted a graduated and numbered disc. While this system was used by Tompion, many refer to it incorrectly as the "Tompion regulator". However, he certainly did not invent this system, as such regulating devices were already in use by the 1670s on French balance spring watches of the Thuret pattern.

As England's most prominent watchmaker, Tompion's workshop built about 5,500 watches and 650 clocks during his career. Tompion's clocks are known for their ingenuity of design and robust construction. His three-train grande sonnerie bracket clocks are masterpieces. Those interested in mechanics are particularly attracted to the mechanisms of such clocks and his repeating watches as they are quite complex, indeed it could even be said over-complex, though efficient in operation. He shares this characteristic with the later French-Swiss watchmaker Abraham-Louis Breguet.

Another of Tompion's innovations was to create a numbering system for his spring and longcase clocks, which is thought to be the first time that a serial numbering system was applied to manufactured goods.

=== Later life ===
Tompion went into partnership with Edward Banger in 1701 until about 1707 or 1708, when it was dissolved in circumstances which are not at all clear. Certainly from around 1711 it was George Graham who was in partnership with Tompion. Some of his later productions are jointly signed, and mysteriously some clocks have this signature on a separate plate which overlays that of Tompion and Banger engraved on the dial plate proper.

George Graham went on to further develop the designs of both scientific instruments as well as clocks and watches after Tompion's death, and he also continued Tompion's numbering system for his clocks and watches.

Thomas Tompion died on 20 November 1713 and was buried in Westminster Abbey, George Graham being buried alongside him in 1751. There is also a memorial to him within Westminster Abbey. Many of his clocks are still operational today, including two of his one-year clocks in Buckingham Palace. Many of his watches survive and due to their sound construction still continue to work, as predicted by Hatton in 1773.

The modern Swiss wristwatch brand "Tompion" of the so-called "British Masters" series has no connection either with Thomas Tompion or the original firm of that name.

== Examples of Tompion's work ==
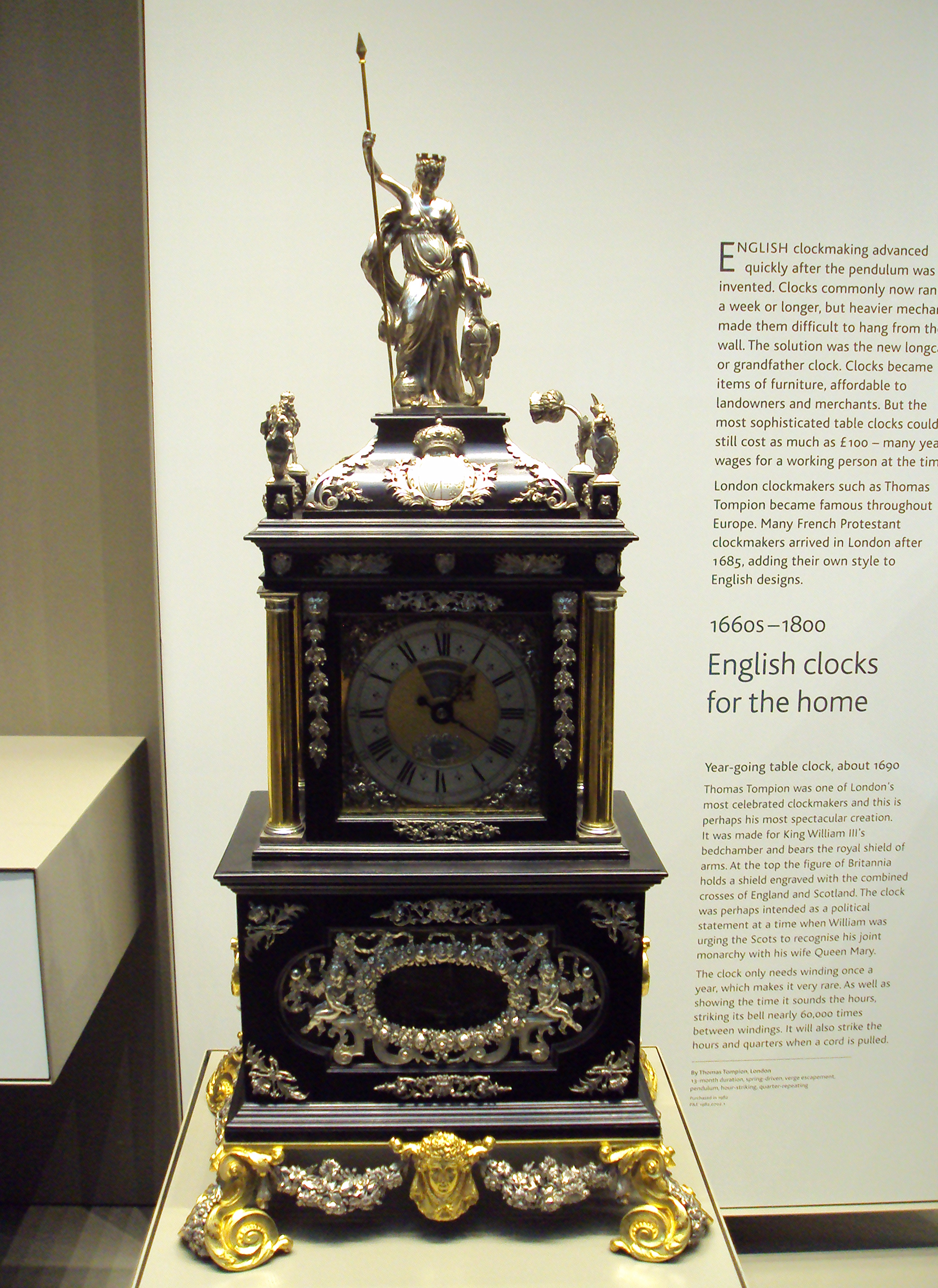
Ornate clock (known as the 'Mostyn Tompion') made by Thomas Tompion in the British Museum, 1690 AD

- A longcase clock with astronomical dial circa 1680 John Smith – Fitzwilliam Museum Cambridge, England
- A year duration spring clock with grand sonnerie striking, known as the "Mostyn Tompion"; perhaps Tompion's finest clock – Djanogly Horological Gallery, British Museum, Bloomsbury, London
- An eight-day double pull repeating table clock in ebonized case. London. circa 1700. Moyse's Hall Museum, Bury St Edmunds, Suffolk, England
- One of the first watches with a spiral balance spring – Science Museum, Kensington, London
- The sundials in Kew Gardens and Hampton Court Gardens, both circa 1680, London

== Cultural references ==
Thos. Tompion is one of the statues of craftsmen set on the Exhibition Road façade of the Victoria and Albert Museum, South Kensington.

In Elizabeth Goudge's 1960 novel The Dean's Watch, Thomas Tompion is remembered reverently by the clockmaker Isaac Peabody.

In the 1986 film Clockwise, the school of which John Cleese's character is headmaster was named for Thomas Tompion, appropriate given the headmaster's attention to punctuality.

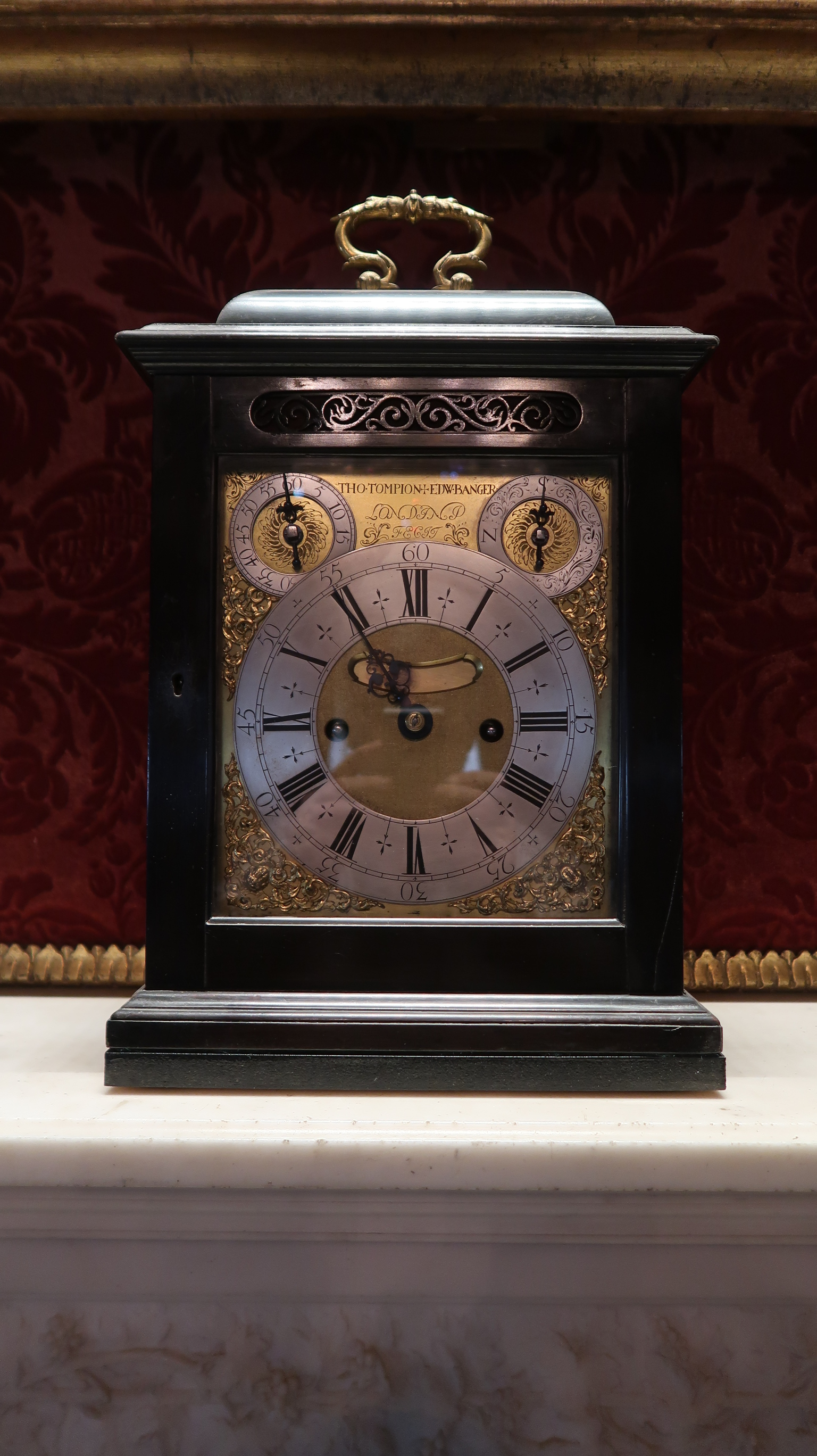
Tompion & Banger Carriage Clock showing separate dials for hours and minutes - in the Dining Room at Kenwood House, Hampstead

In The Pickwick Papers, by Charles Dickens, the pump room at Bath is said to have a Tompion clock.
