= Worshipful Company of Clockmakers =

Livery company of the City of London

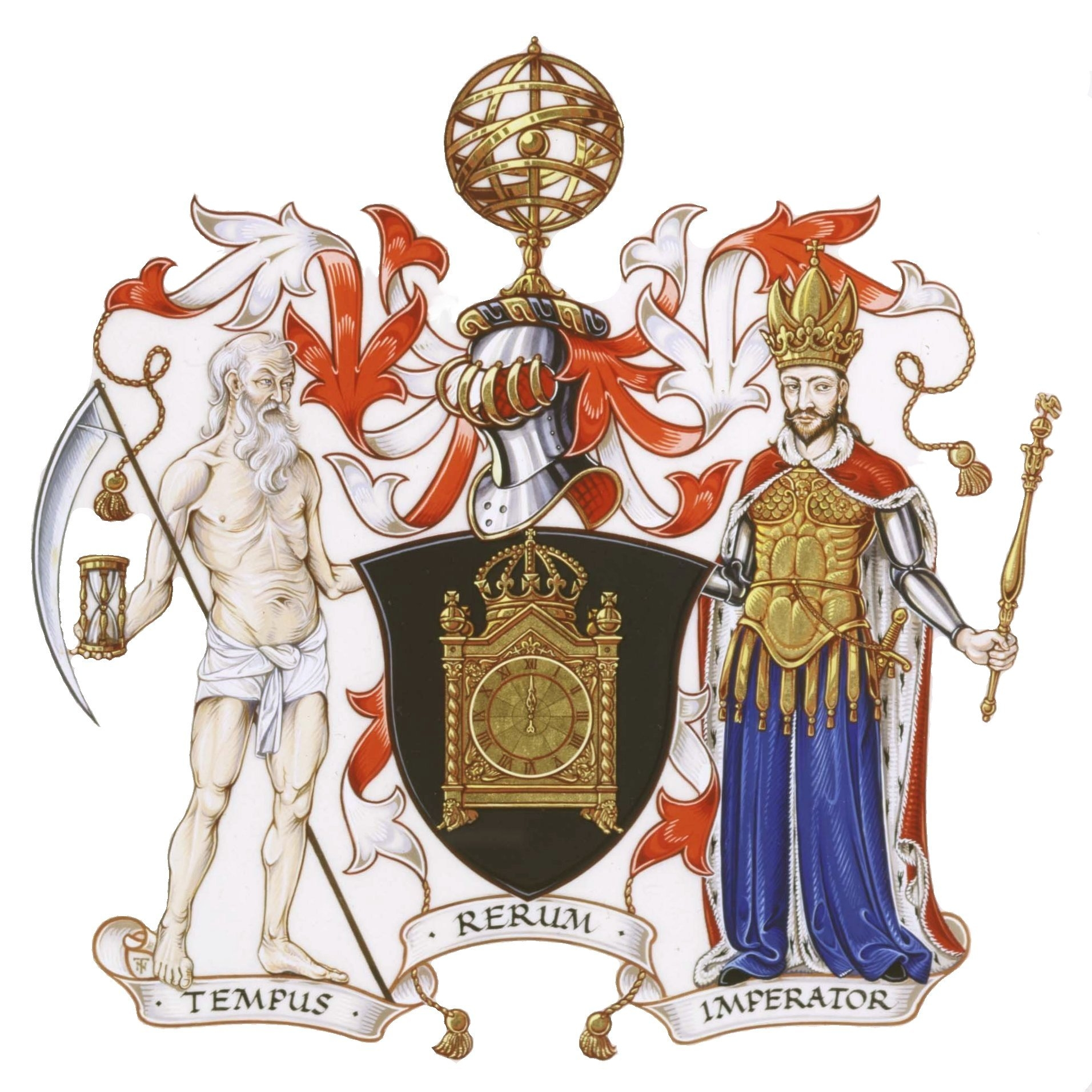
- Arms of the Clockmakers' Company, granted in January 1672. Blazon: Sable, a Clock ye Four Pillars thereof Erected on Four Lyons, and on Each Capital a Globe with a Cross, and in the Middest an Imperiall Crowne all Or, and for their Crest upon an Helmet Proper Mantled Gules Doubled Argent and Wreath of their Colours a Spheare Or, the Armes Supported by the Figures of a Naked Old Man Holding a Scithe and an Hour Glasse Representing Time, and of an Emperour in Roabes Crowned Holding a Scepter.
- Motto: Tempus Rerum Imperator
- Location: 1 Throgmorton Avenue, London EC2N 2BY
- Date of formation: 1631
- Company association: Horology
- Order of precedence: 61st
- Master of company: Robert Woolgar Wren
- Website: clockmakers.org

The Worshipful Company of Clockmakers is a London professional association first established under a Royal Charter granted by King Charles I in 1631. It ranks sixty-first among the livery companies of the City of London, and comes under the jurisdiction of the Privy Council. The company established a library and its museum in 1813, which is the oldest specific collection of clocks and watches worldwide. This is administered by the company's affiliated charity, the Clockmakers' Charity, and is presently housed on the second floor of London's Science Museum. The modern aims of the company and its museum are charitable and educational, in particular to promote and preserve clockmaking and watchmaking, which as of 2019 were added to the HCA Red List of Endangered Crafts.

The Clockmakers' Museum, comprising a collection of clocks, watches, portraits and ephemera is housed in a new gallery provided by the Science Museum, officially opened by Princess Anne on 22 October 2015. The museum was first established in 1813, and was housed at London's Guildhall from 1874 to 2014. It claims to be the oldest collection specifically of watches and clocks in the world. Though the collection is now housed in the Clockmakers' Museum in South Kensington, the company's archive and library are however still kept at Guildhall Library. The museum collection includes John Harrison's sea watch H5, once personally tested by King George III.

== Motto ==
The company's motto, Tempus Rerum Imperator, can be translated as ‘Time, the Ruler of All Things’. It appears as an epitaph on the tombstone of former British Prime Minister Harold Wilson, a liveryman of the company.

== History ==
Prior to the seventeenth century, clockmaking by native English craftsmen was mostly confined to the production of turret clocks. Domestic clocks and watches were mostly imported or the work of immigrants from the European continent. Because turret clock making involved working in ferrous metal, clockmakers within the City of London tended to be freemen of the Blacksmiths’ Company, though some were members of other livery companies, notably the Clothworkers.

After the loss of many London clock and watchmakers in the plagues of 1598 and 1603, the trade consolidated and began to grow. The continued influx of newcomers led to resentment from those who had become established in London towards outsiders who came to set up in or near the City and who threatened their market. From 1620 onwards, groups of clockmakers attempted to set up their own guild. The Blacksmiths initially succeeded in opposing these moves. Eventually, however, with the king issuing charters as a means of raising much needed finance at a time when he had prorogued Parliament, the clockmakers succeeded in securing a royal charter, on 22 August 1631, to the distress of the Blacksmiths, who could naturally expect to lose members, and therefore income.

The charter gave regulatory authority to the Clockmakers to control the horological trade in the City of London and for a radius of ten miles around. It incorporated a controlling body which should have ‘continuance for ever under the style and name of The Master, Wardens and Fellowship of the Art and Mystery of Clockmaking’. It provided that the fellowship should be governed by a master, three wardens and ten or more assistants who would form the Court. The first master was David Ramsay, a Scot, who had been appointed watchmaker to James VI of Scotland, later James I of England. The noted clockmaker Edward East also formed part of the first court.

The original charter is still in the company's possession and is housed with the rest of its library and archive in the Guildhall Library. The company obtained a grant of arms from the College of Arms in January 1672. In 1766, the Court of Aldermen granted the company its livery. The number of liverymen was originally limited at sixty but has been increased in number over the years by approval of the City of London Corporation and currently stands at a maximum of three hundred.

== Horological Training and Awards for Excellence ==
The company bestows three awards for excellence: the Tompion Medal for outstanding achievements in horology, the Harrison Medal for the propagation of horological knowledge and its appreciation, and the Derek Pratt Prize for innovation, ingenuity, elegance, and the highest standards of workmanship and precision performance in the craft and science of time and timekeeping. The company also closely co-operates with the trustees of the George Daniels Educational Trust in supporting education in horology.

== Affiliations ==
The Clockmakers Company is formally affiliated with the Antiquarian Horological Society, the UCL Observatory, HMS Protector, the Royal Navy's Ice Patrol Ship, HMS Archer, a P264 Class University Royal Naval Unit based in Edinburgh, and XIII Squadron RAF.

== Masters ==
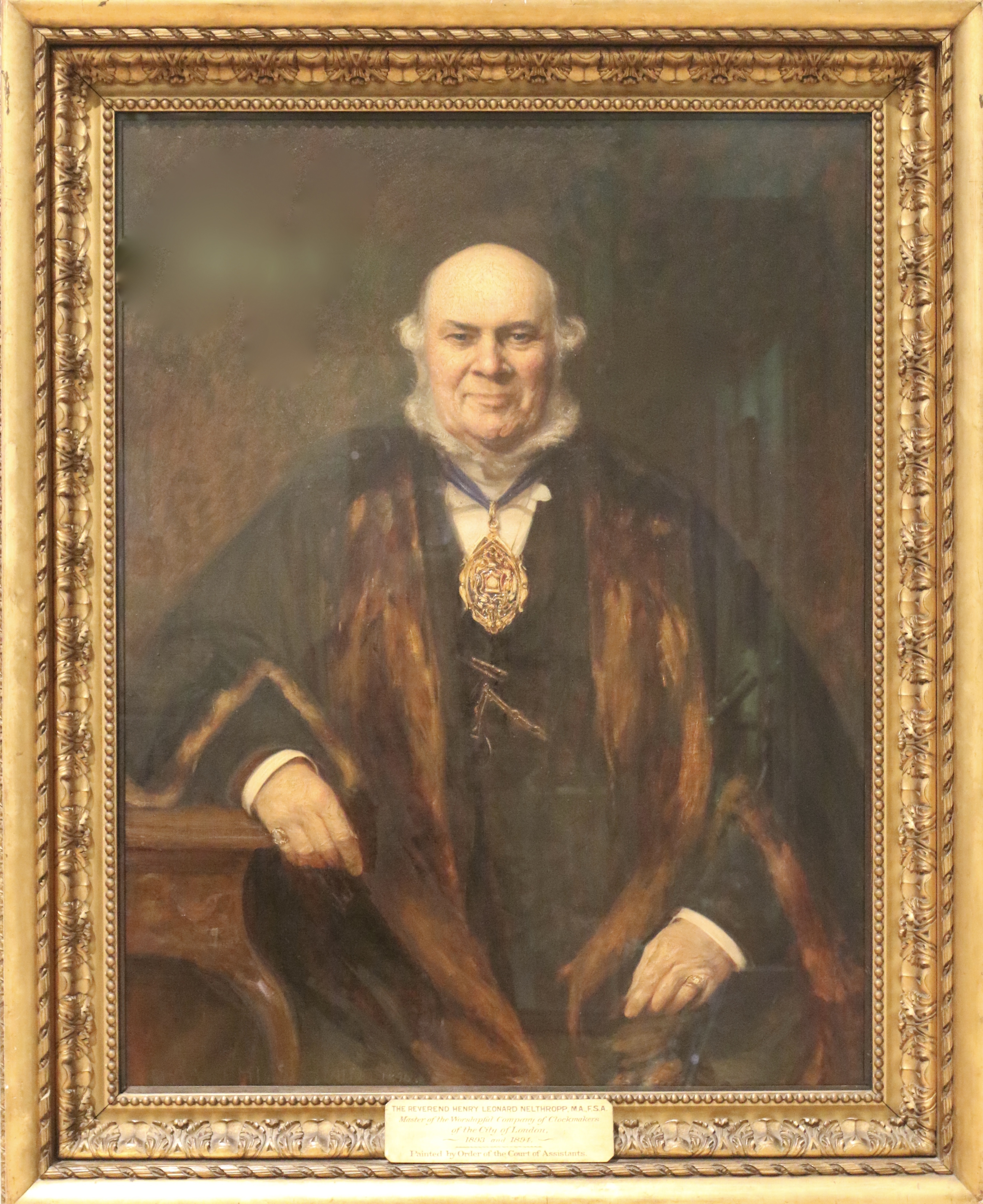
The Reverend Henry Leonard Nelthropp MA FSA, Master of the Worshipful Company of Clockmakers of the City of London 1893 and 1894.

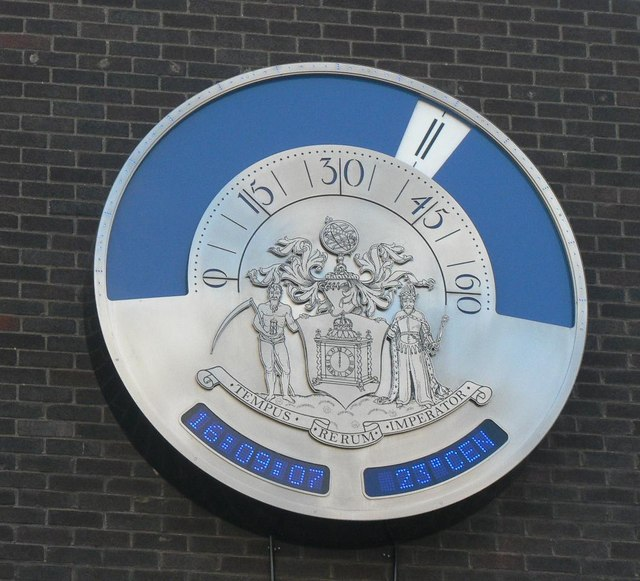
The Newgate Street clock, the Worshipful Company of Clockmakers' 375th anniversary gift to the City of London.

Those who have been Master of the company include the following:

- 1631, David Ramsay
- 1636, Elias Allen
- 1645, 1652 Edward East
- 1699, Henry Thornton
- 1700, Charles Gretton
- 1702, Joseph Windmills
- 1703, Thomas Tompion
- 1708, Daniel Quare
- 1717 Nathaniel Chamberlain
- 1718, Thomas Windmills
- 1795, 1812 Harry Potter
- 1810, 1811 Paul Philipp Barraud
- 1817, John Roger Arnold
- 1821, 1823, 1825, 1827, 1847 Benjamin Lewis Vulliamy
- 1855, 1862 Charles Frodsham
- 1893, 1894 Revd. Henry Leonard Nelthropp
- 1902, 1914 William Henry Mahoney Christie KCB FRS
- 1922, 1931 Sir Frank Watson Dyson KBE FRS FRSE
- 1926, Hugh Rotherham
- 1932 Sir Francis Newbolt KC FCS
- 1946, Lord Iliffe of Yattendon GBE
- 1949, 1954 Sir Harold Spencer Jones KBE FRS FRSE PRAS
- 1950, William Hamilton Shortt FBHI
- 1959, Viscount Falmouth
- 1960, Lord Harris
- 1969, Sir Richard van der Riet Woolley OBE FRS
- 1974, Sir Frank Chalton Francis KCB
- 1976, Sir Hugh Wontner GBE CVO
- 1980, George Daniels CBE DSc FBHI FSA AHCI
- 1986, Viscount Falmouth
- 1989, Lord Murton of Lindisfarne OBE TD PC
- 2000, Alexander Boksenberg CBE FRS
- 2001, Sir George White, Bt, FSA
- 2002, Michael Monro Smith
- 2003, Christopher John Hurrion
- 2004, Philip John Willoughby
- 2005, Diana Muriel Uff
- 2006, Maj Gen David Anthony Somerset Pennefather CB OBE
- 2007, David John Poole MBE FBHI
- 2008, Dr Michael David Sanderson PhD
- 2009, Cdr Peter John Linstead-Smith OBE RN
- 2010, Howard Carl Newman FBHI
- 2011, Andrew Charles Henry Crisford FSA
- 2012, Mark Westcombe Elliott FCA
- 2013, Prof Paul Eugene Marcus Jarrett FRCS
- 2014, Jonathan Daniel Betts MBE FSA FBHI
- 2015, Philip William Tennant Whyte, Hon FBHI
- 2016, Robert Michael Justice Stewart
- 2017, Roy Charles Harris, FBHI
- 2018, Andrew Lewis James, FRSA, Hon MBHI
- 2019, Jonathan Edward Hills
- 2020, Joanna Migdal (Lady White)
- 2021, Mark H Levy
- 2022, Dr James Nye, FSA
- 2023, Jane Pedler
- 2024, Keith Scobie-Youngs, FBHI, ACR
- 2025, Robert Woolgar Wren, FBHI
- 2026, Dr Robert J Lamb, FRCOphth FRCSE

== Company Chaplains and Church ==
- Father Tim Handley
- St James Garlickhythe

== Gallery ==
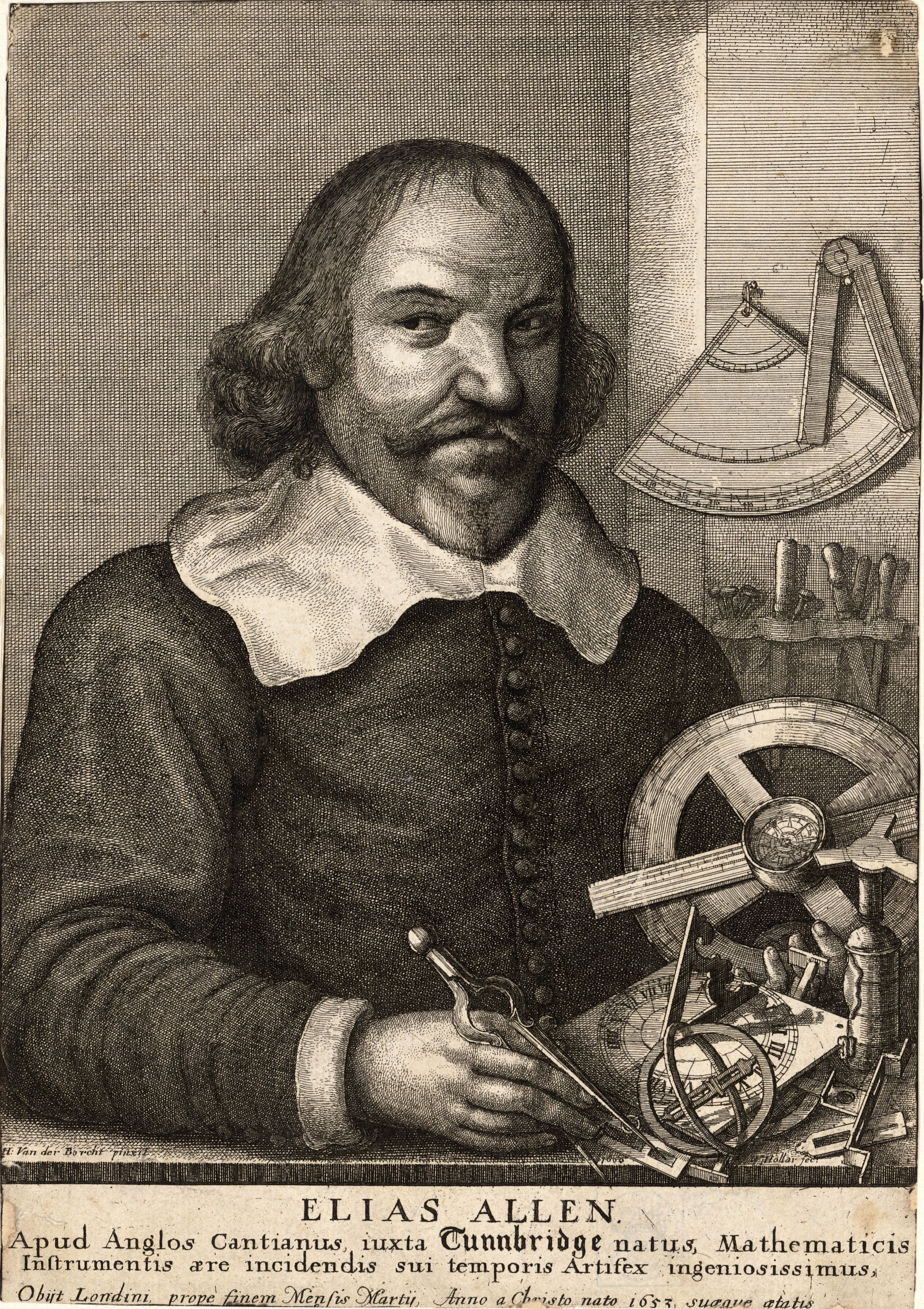
Elias Allen

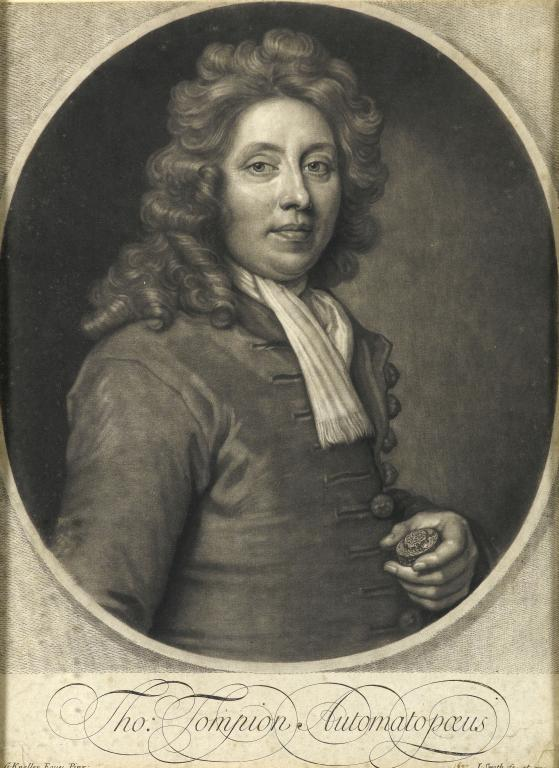
Thomas Tompion

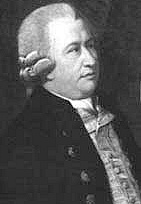
John Arnold

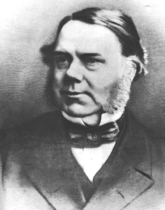
Charles Frodsham

== See also ==
- Antiquarian Horological Society
- British Horological Institute
- Clockmakers' Museum
- Dingwall Beloe Lecture Series
- Charles Gretton
