= Jonathan Betts =

British horologist

Jonathan Betts MBE (born January 1955) is a British horological scholar and author, and an expert on the timekeepers created by John Harrison in the middle of the 18th century. Now practising as a horological consultant, Betts was formerly senior specialist in horology at the National Maritime Museum in Greenwich. Between 2016 and 2019 he served on the board of trustees of the Institute of Conservation, and between 2006 and 2024 he served on the council of the Antiquarian Horological Society.

== Career ==
Betts is from a family of retail watchmakers and jewellers; he took the British Horological Institute finals in technical horology. In 1975 he was awarded the Tremayne National Prize for Practical Watchmaking. For the next five years, he practised as a self-employed horology conservator. In 1980 he was appointed as senior horology conservator at the National Maritime Museum, based at the Royal Observatory, both now part of Royal Museums Greenwich. In 1989 he was presented the museum's Callender Award for his contribution to horological conservation. He was appointed curator of horology in 1990 and became senior specialist in 2001.

Betts wrote a biography about Rupert Gould, the restorer of the Harrison timekeepers. The biography was published in 2006 by Oxford University Press under the title Time Restored: The Harrison Timekeepers and RT Gould, the Man Who Knew (Almost) Everything. In 2002 Betts was awarded the Clockmakers' Company's Harrison Gold Medal and the British Horological Institute's Barrett Medal in 2008. He is a Huntington Fellow at the Mariners' Museum in Newport News, Virginia. He is a fellow of the Royal Society of Arts, the Society of Antiquaries, and of the International Institute of Conservation. He is an honorary librarian of the Antiquarian Horological Society, and serves as horological adviser to the National Trust as well as clocks adviser to the Anglican Diocese of Southwark.

Betts is a curatorial adviser for the substantial collection of clocks at Belmont House and Gardens in Faversham, England southeast of London in the care of the Harris (Belmont) Charity. He is also curatorial adviser to the Clockmakers' Company. In 2014 he served as Master of the Clockmakers' Company. He was on the vetting committee of the annual art fair organised by the British Antique Dealers' Association and was chairman of the clocks vetting committee of London's Masterpiece Fair. In 1996, he was credited for the idea and detail for a central element in the plot of "Time on Our Hands", an episode of the British TV comedy Only Fools and Horses. In 2000, he was an adviser on Longitude, a television drama on Granada.

== Awards ==
- Betts was appointed a Member of the Order of the British Empire (MBE) in the 2012 Birthday Honours for services to horology.
- In 2012, he received the BQ 'Watch Culture' award in China, from a Beijing-based journal BQ.
- In 2013 he was awarded the Plowden Medal by the Royal Warrant Holder's Association for his contribution to Horology Conservation.
- He received the Prix Gaïa on 17 September 2015 for his achievements in historical research.
- He was elected a Fellow of the Antiquarian Horological Society in July 2024 and now serves as one of the Society's Vice Presidents.

== Publications ==
- National Trust Pocket Guide to Clocks (Octopus, 1985)
- Harrison (National Maritime Museum, 1993, and subsequent editions)
- Clocks and Watches, a Guide to the Belmont Collection (Belmont, 1998)
- Time Restored (OUP, 2006)
- Marine Chronometers at Greenwich (OUP, 2017)
- Harrison Decoded: Towards a Perfect Pendulum Clock, edited with Rory McEvoy (OUP, 2020)
- A General History of Horology, edited by Anthony Turner, James Nye and Jonathan Betts (OUP, 2022)
