= Charles Gretton =

English clock and watchmaker

- Born: Charles Gretton; Claypole, Lincolnshire, England
- Baptised: 24 January 1647/48 Claypole, Lincolnshire, England
- Died: 25 June 1731; London, England
- Resting place: Church of St Dunstan-in-the-West, Fleet Street, London
- Occupations: clockmaker and watchmaker

Charles Gretton was an English clock and watchmaker during the golden age of English clockmaking.

== Early life ==
Gretton was baptised in Claypole, Lincolnshire, on 24 January 1647/48. He was possibly the third youngest of nine or ten children. His mother was Agnes (Anne), née Atterby, and his father was Charles, a cottager, who held pieces of land and livestock. When his father died, Charles inherited two shillings.

== Career ==
The signature and seal of Charles Gretton.

A fine marquetry 8-day longcase clock with quarter striking movement. Circa 1690-95.

An exceptional gilt double basket top spring clock engraved in Spanish. The dial having a moon phase, age of the moon, day of the week with its astronomical symbol, and the date. With separate hour repeat and pull quarter repeat. Circa 1700-05.

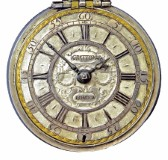
A typical Gretton silver pair cased watch with silver champlevé dial, signed Gretton, London. Circa 1695-97.

Charles Gretton left Claypole for London at the age of 14 to apprentice under Humphrey Downing, a freeman of the Worshipful Company of Blacksmiths. Downing had his premises on Chancery Lane. This location was spared from the Great Fire of London in 1666, but in December of the same year, Downing died. It is believed that Charles continued his apprenticeship under Cordelia Downing, Humphrey’s wife, and later worked as a journeyman until he was made a freeman of the Worshipful Company of Clockmakers (the 'Clockmakers' Company') on 3 June 1672.

Charles Gretton established his first workshop on Fleet Street with John Johnson but in 1678 moved into his own premises, ‘The Ship,’ in the vicinity of Fleet Street and Fetter Lane. Gretton worked during the period which is often called ‘The Golden Age of English Clockmaking,’ when many innovations were created and the trade flourished. He took at least eight apprentices, including his nephew Charles Kemp (who became the master to Tom Tompion’s nephew), John Farewell, and Joseph Antram, the latter of whom became a clockmaker to King George I. The best known of Gretton’s apprentices was Henry Sully, who after completing his apprenticeship stayed with Gretton as a journeyman for four years rather than the more customary two years. Sully then moved to France, becoming quite famous in the Continent and in Great Britain. Sully is remembered for his efforts to develop a seagoing clock for determining longitude at sea. Charles Gretton was a prolific maker of clocks and watches for home and abroad. THROUGH THE GOLDEN AGE – Charles Gretton – Watch and Clockmaking, published in 2016, lists 74 extant longcase clocks, 52 spring clocks, five lantern clocks and 29 watches, but more have been discovered since.

Gretton made more watches than clocks, as did many of his contemporaries. Based on dating of his extant clocks and watches, it would seem that his workshop began producing watches in about 1673, followed by clocks in the mid-1670s. Gretton’s peak production lasted about 25 years, from approximately 1685 until about 1710, when his output dropped significantly. He continued to make at least clocks until the mid-1720s, when it is believed he retired from clockmaking. However, Gretton maintained a strong relationship with the Clockmakers’ Company until the very last years of his life.

Gretton's earliest known extant watch dates to before 1675 and is on display at the British Museum, London. The watch has crystals on both front and back, the back revealing the gilt brass top plate, which includes a subsidiary seconds dial, even though this is a pre-balance spring watch. Because of its complexity, this certainly would not have been Gretton's first watch. Gretton produced timepieces, clock watches, alarm watches, several forms of repeating watches (i.e., which contained repeaters), and polychrome decorated watches with enamel dials and porcelain boxes. Many of the extant watches retain their boxes and cases; some of the makers of these items can be identified.

Gretton clocks were always of the highest quality, comparable to those of London's best makers. His early longcase clocks were housed in walnut cases. Later, the cases had parquetry decoration, followed by floral marquetry, arabesque and then seaweed marquetry, ebony-veneered cases, and lacquer-decorated cases. He returned to walnut for his late longcase clocks.

Most of Gretton’s longcase movements had countwheel-striking control, although some had rack striking and quarter striking. Many early clocks had bolt-and-shutter maintaining power.

Gretton's spring clocks were usually in an ebony-veneered or ebonized case with little or no decoration, other than the carrying handle. Gretton was, however, an early user of gilt basket-top cases. Most clocks originally stood on ebonized pad feet. Some peak-period spring clocks could be housed in a marquetry or kingwood case.

Almost all spring clocks employed rack striking. Gretton was an early adopter, if not the originator, of a strike/silent mechanism. Clocks employing this mechanism, but signed by at least one other maker (Hessenius), certainly originated from Gretton's workshop.

Gretton was also an early adopter of mechanisms for silent-pull timepieces, several forms of which are known. Most Gretton spring clocks after about 1685 have a pull quarter repeat mechanism; several complex forms of this have been documented.

== The Worshipful Company of Clockmakers ==
Gretton was very active in the Worshipful Company of Clockmakers. He became a steward in 1684 and a warden in 1688, and he was elected Master of the Company in 1700. Gretton continued his commitment to the Clockmakers’ Company until his late years, when ill health likely prevented his direct participation. The Clockmakers’ Company Court appointed Gretton to represent the Company as a proprietor with the Bank of England in 1714, and he held this position for several years.

== Philanthropic Activities ==
Charles Gretton became very successful in business and had the means to acquire wealth and a number of urban and rural properties. He had a keen interest in philanthropy, particularly relating to education. In 1701, he donated £50 to the Clockmakers’ Company to fund apprenticeships for orphaned sons of clockmakers. In 1704, the first boy started his apprenticeship with the help of this fund. The last recorded recipient was in 1842. At least 77 boys were able to enter the clockmaking trade through this programme. Charles Gretton’s will arranged a fund and the structure to establish and maintain a School for Poor Boys, in Claypole, Lincolnshire. It is believed that this school for ten boys continued until 1823, more than 90 years after Gretton’s death. This charity was financed by the rent on Gretton’s workshop, The Ship, on Fleet Street, which was willed to his son Thomas.

‘Gretton’s Gift,’ another donation to Claypole set out in his will, continued into the early 20th century. Gretton was a donating governor at Bridewell Hospital and Christ’s Hospital; both engaged in education and training, and both still exist as schools.

== Civic life ==
Gretton’s civic appointments included being a warden at the church of St Dunstan-in-the-West. He also was a Common Councilman for the Ward of Farringdon Without, representing the parish of St Dunstan-in-the-West for many years.

He served as a tax commissioner, and at times as an adjuster, for Ludgate and for both precincts of the parish of St Martin, Ludgate.

== Marriages ==
Charles Gretton and Mary (née Phillips) married in 1678. They had ten children, only three of whom survived into adulthood. Mary Gretton died in December 1698, as did two of the children.

Their son Phillips attended St Paul’s School, London, and Trinity College, Cambridge, attaining his Doctor of Divinity degree at the latter. Phillips became the rector in Springfield, Essex, where he stayed for the rest of his life. Phillips was married in the newly completed St Paul’s Cathedral, London, in March 1712/13.

Daughter Ann married John Houghton, a glover. Charles Gretton lived the very last years of his life with Ann at the Houghton home in Milk Street, London. Ann was buried in Springfield in January 1752/53, where her nephew, Phillips' son, had become the rector.

Little is known about Thomas, the youngest son. He married Elizabeth Turner, a widow. The Ship was willed to Thomas, but £10 of the yearly rent funded the charities in Claypole. Thomas was also buried in Springfield.

Charles Gretton married Lucy Uffman in 1700, but she must have died, because Gretton was married again in 1711, this time to Dorothea Wilson. Gretton became a widower for the third time in 1727.

== Death ==
Charles Gretton died on 25 June 1731 and was buried at St Dunstan-in-the-West, Fleet Street, on 5 July 1731. He had reserved £100 for his funeral costs and was buried ‘in very decent manner,’ according to a newspaper at the time. Besides his beautiful clocks and watches, Charles left considerable wealth, including at least nine properties.

== Additional resources ==
Essex Archives: Springfield Parish Records.

Lincolnshire Archives: Claypole Parish Records (births and deaths, deeds): Charles Gretton’s parents’ wills and inventories, deeds, educational history.

London Metropolitan Archives (deeds, marriage records, tax records): St Dunstan-in-the-West vestry minutes.

Loomes, Brian. Several books on horology and clockmakers, including documentation on Charles Gretton.

National Archives, Kew: Charles Gretton’s will.

Priestley, Phillip. (2000). Early Watch Case Makers of England 1631–1720. Columbia, PA: National Association of Watch and Clock Collectors. ISBN 0-9668869-1-7. .

Stevens, John J. (1965). 'The Clockmaker from Claypole.' Lincolnshire Historian, 2(12), 27–34.

Stevens, John J. (1962). ‘Charles Gretton: A Brief Resume of His Life, Compiled from Original Documents.’ Antiquarian Horology, 4(2), 40–45.
