= Red List of Endangered Crafts =

British list of artisan crafts in danger of disappearing

The Red List of Endangered Crafts is an inventory of traditional crafts and trades practiced in the UK that are at risk of dying out in the succeeding generation. The original Red List, which took two years to compile, was first published by Heritage Crafts on 3 May 2017 with financial support from the Radcliffe Trust. The inventory evaluated 169 crafts and all are graded along the model of animal species at risk, using categories: least concern, endangered, critically endangered, near-extinct and extinct.

The second edition of the Red List was published on 9 March 2019, with 212 crafts evaluated; the critically endangered list increased to 36 crafts. 102 crafts were classified as currently viable.

The third edition of the Red List was published on 24 May 2021, with 244 crafts evaluated; the critically endangered list increased to 56 crafts. 110 crafts were classified as currently viable.

Research for the fourth edition of the Red List began in September 2022, with financial support from the Pilgrim Trust, and was released on 11 May 2023. This edition evaluated 259 crafts and added a further 17 skills to the list including straw hat making and encaustic tile making.

== Red List ==
The Red List of Endangered Crafts, originally known as the Radcliffe Red List, was modelled on the IUCN Red List and other such inventories, and was influenced by UNESCO's work on the safeguarding of intangible cultural heritage. The United Kingdom is one of only a few countries whose intangible cultural heritage is not yet recognised by UNESCO. The publication, which took two years to compile, was launched at the House of Lords and was subsequently featured in various media, including BBC Radio 4 Woman's Hour.

It is the first report of its kind in the UK, although an earlier general analysis of the heritage craft sector and its contribution to the economy in England was undertaken in 2012 by the Department for Business, Innovation and Skills.

The report identifies a heritage craft as “a practice which employs manual dexterity and skill and an understanding of traditional materials, design and techniques, and which has been practised for two or more successive generations”. It also summarises some of the reasons for the decline of heritage crafts in the UK including the difficulties recruiting apprentices, the increased age of the artisan workforce, high prices for articles made by hand and an overall decline in demand. Greta Bertram, who managed the original report, identified one of the principle aims of the report was to bring pressure upon the government to help preserve the crafts for the future, saying,

“We would like to see the government recognise the importance of traditional craft skills as part of our cultural heritage, and take action to ensure they are passed on to the next generation."

Whilst heritage conservation has gained widespread popularity over the last century, preserving buildings and architecture for the future, Heritage Crafts has championed craft skills as part of British cultural heritage for similar preservation, and hopes to use the Red List to inform policy decisions on where to invest future funding.

The foreword to the original Red List was written by the former Prince of Wales in his capacity as President of Heritage Crafts, stating,

“I urgently believe that we must gather more information on the crafts identified so far to ensure that no more treasured skills are lost for ever.”

The second edition of the Red List was published in March 2019 and watchmaking joined the critically endangered category, with fewer than 30 watchmakers able to commercially create a watch from scratch. It is hoped that its inclusion may encourage the UK to become a signatory of UNESCO's Convention for the Safeguarding of the Intangible Cultural Heritage.

The third edition, released in May 2021, added a further 20 crafts to the list, citing the COVID-19 lockdown in the UK as a contributing factor. Sheet glass blowing, barometer making, Scottish kilt making, Shetlands lace making and glass eye making were all added.

The fourth edition, released in May 2023, added a further 17 crafts to the list. Traditional wooden boatbuilding, Cornish hedging, marionette making and canal boat painting were all added.

== Extinct crafts ==
In the 2023 edition of the Red List, the craft of mouth-blown flat glass making was added to the four that were previously identified as having been already lost in the UK in the preceding decade:

- goldbeating,
- the making of cricket balls,
- traditional lacrosse stick manufacturing,
- paper mould and deckle making, a form of specialised papermaking,
- mouth-blown flat glass making.

Mouth-blown flat glass was produced by English Antique Glass in Birmingham until 2022, at which point they were forced to stop production of this type of glass as a result of pressures to reduce their workshop space.

The last British goldbeaters, W. Habberley Meadows, and Dukes Cricket Balls of London both stopped production in the UK after being unable to recruit an apprentice, having both suffered the effects of cheaper foreign competition.

The original Red List included the manufacture of riddles, a kind of sieve. Following the publication of the report in 2017, however, two individuals came forward to revive the craft, one of whom persuaded the last riddle maker to train them, despite him having retired. The trainees are currently attempting to become commercially viable, thus removing the craft from the extinct category.

Paper mould and deckle making was added to extinct category in the 2019 following the death of the last UK maker Ron MacDonald in 2017.

== Critically endangered crafts ==
At the time of the report's release in 2017, there were seventeen traditional crafts in the 'critically endangered' category, defined as having no trainees to continue the skills involved and as being practiced by either a very small number of artisans or produced by two or fewer companies in the UK. By 2023 the list had grown to 62.

Following the closure of the Whitechapel Bell Foundry (Britain's oldest manufacturing company dating from 1570), bell founding was added to the 2019 list.

A week after the inclusion of sporran making in the critically endangered category of the 2021 list, the Ministry of Defence was criticised in an article in The Times for taking the decision to import military sporrans, leaving Scottish manufacturers on the brink of ruin.

- arrowsmithing
- basketwork furniture making
- bell founding
- bow making (musical)
- bowed-felt hat making
- chain making
- clay pipe making
- clog making with hand-carved soles
- coiled straw basket making
- coppersmithing (objects)
- copper wheel engraving
- currach making
- Devon stave basket making
- diamond cutting
- encaustic tile making
- engine turned engraving
- fabric pleating
- Fair Isle chair making
- fan making
- flute making (concert)
- fore-edge painting
- frame knitting
- glass eye making
- hat block making
- hat plaiting
- hazel basket making
- Highland thatching
- horse collar making
- horsehair weaving
- industrial pottery
- linen damask weaving
- maille making
- metal thread making
- millwrighting
- Northern Isles basket making
- oak bark tanning
- orrery making
- paper making (commercial handmade)
- parchment and vellum making
- piano making
- plane making
- plume making
- pointe shoe making
- saw making
- scientific and optical instrument making
- scissor
- sieve and riddle making
- silk ribbon making
- silver spinning
- spade making
- spinning wheel making
- sporran making
- straw hat making
- Sussex trug making
- swill basket making
- tinsmithing
- wainwrighting
- watch face enamelling
- watchmaking
- whip making
- withy pot making
- wooden fishing net making

== See also ==
- Craft Northern Ireland
- Living Human Treasure
- Rural crafts
