= David Ramsay (watchmaker) =

David Ramsay (died c. 1653), was a Scottish clockmaker who worked for James VI and I and Charles I of England.

== Career ==
Born in Scotland, he was from the family of Ramsay of Dalhousie. His son William (fl. 1660) wrote that when King James succeeded to the crown of England in 1603, "he sent into France for my father, who was then there, and made him page of the bedchamber and groom of the privy chamber, and keeper of all his majesties' clocks and watches. This I mention that by some he hath bin termed no better than a watch maker. ... It's confest his ingenuity led him to understand any piece of work in that nature ... and therefore the king conferred that place upon him".

On 25 November 1613 he was appointed clockmaker-extraordinary to the king with a pension of £50 a year, and in March 1616 a warrant was issued for the payment to him of £234 and 10 shillings for the purchase and repair of clocks and watches for the king. On 26 November 1618 he was appointed chief clockmaker, and on 27 July 1619 letters of denization were granted to him. Various other warrants were passed for payments for his services, and in one which bears date 17 March 1627 he is described as "David Ramsay, esq., our clockmaker and page of our bedchamber". His early works are marked "David Ramsay, Scotus".

On the incorporation of the Clockmakers' Company in 1631 Ramsay became the first master, but he probably took very little part in the work of the society. Upon taking the oath before the lord mayor he was described as "of the city of London", but the city records do not furnish any evidence that he was a freeman. Walter Scott introduces the character David Ramsay, without any strict regard for historical accuracy, in the opening chapter of The Fortunes of Nigel as the keeper of a shop "a few yards to the eastward of Temple Bar".

Ramsay was also a student of the occult sciences. In William Lilly's Life and Times (1715), an amusing account is given of an attempt made in 1634 by Ramsay and others to discover hidden treasure in Westminster Abbey by means of the divining rod, when the operations were interrupted by fierce blasts of wind, attributed by the terrified spectators to demons, who were, however, promptly exorcised. Sir Edward Coke, writing to Secretary Windebanke, on 9 May 1639, about a demand for money which it was inconvenient to meet, says: "If, now, David Ramsay can co-operate with his philosopher's stone, he would do a good service". There are also entries in the Calendars of State Papers, dated 28 July 1628 and 13 August 1635, relating to hidden treasure which Ramsay proposed to discover. A manuscript in the British Library Sloane Collection, No. 1046, bearing the title "Liber Philosophicus, de divinis mysteriis, de Deo, Hominibus, anima, meteoris", is attributed to him on insufficient authority.

In 1638, Ramsay provided a clock and a dial for the gatehouse between the middle and upper wards of Windsor Castle. He designed the case for the clock, which was called a "pyramid or lanthorne". Ramsay was also an inventor, and between 1618 and 1638 he obtained eight patents (Nos. 6, 21, 49, 50, 53, 68, 78, 117). Although the full titles of these patents are given in the indexes published by the commissioners of patents, no information as to the precise nature of the inventions is extant. They relate to ploughing land, fertilising barren ground, raising water by fire, propelling ships and boats, manufacture of saltpetre, making tapestry without a loom, refining copper, bleaching wax, separating gold and silver from the base metals, dyeing fabrics, heating boilers, kilns for drying and burning bricks and tiles, and smelting and refining iron by means of coal. In his later years he fell into poverty, and in 1641, while a prisoner for debt, he petitioned the House of Lords for payment of six years' arrears of his pension as groom of the privy chamber. Towards the payment of those arrears the committee for advance of money, by an order dated 13 January 1645, granted him one third of the money arising from his discovery of delinquents' estates. It would appear from this that he had joined the parliamentary party. On 11 February 1651 there is a note in the proceedings of the council of state that a petition of David Ramsay was referred to the mint committee.

Ramsay made a table clock, now in the Victoria and Albert Museum, which has engraved images of the four Evangelists on the outside and conceals within a satirical image of the Pope. He made a watch given to Robert Carr, Earl of Somerset by King James, perhaps at the time of his marriage to Frances Howard in 1613. This watch, signed "David Ramsay Scotus, me fecit", is held by the National Museum of Scotland.

Other watches made by Ramsay are to be found in the British Museum, in the Victoria and Albert Museum, and the Metropolitan Museum of Art, New York. A star-shaped watch signed "David Ramsay Scottes me fecit" was found at Gawdy Hall in Norfolk. A technical description of several specimens is given in Britten's Former Clock and Watch Makers.

His son William, in the dedication to his father of his Vox Stellarum (1652), refers to the latter's pecuniary difficulties, which gave "occasion to some inferior-spirited people not to value you according to what you both are by nature and in yourself".

The date of Ramsay's death is unknown, but he appears to have been living in 1653, the postscript of his son's Astrologia Restaurata being dated 17 January 1653, "from my study in my father's house in Holborn, within two doors of the Wounded Hart, near the King's Gate".

A petition dated 21 June 1661, there is a petition of Sir Theophilus Gilby and Mary, widow of a David Ramsay, who states that she raised troops for the king's service "at Duke Hamilton's coming into England", since which time she has been sequestered and plundered. But she may possibly have been the widow of another David Ramsay, a courtier. It can be difficult to distinguish the clockmaker and this courtier in some contemporary records.
