= Ickwell May Day =

May Day celebration in Ickwell, Bedfordshire

Coordinates: 52°5′46.8186″N 0°19′23.1132″W

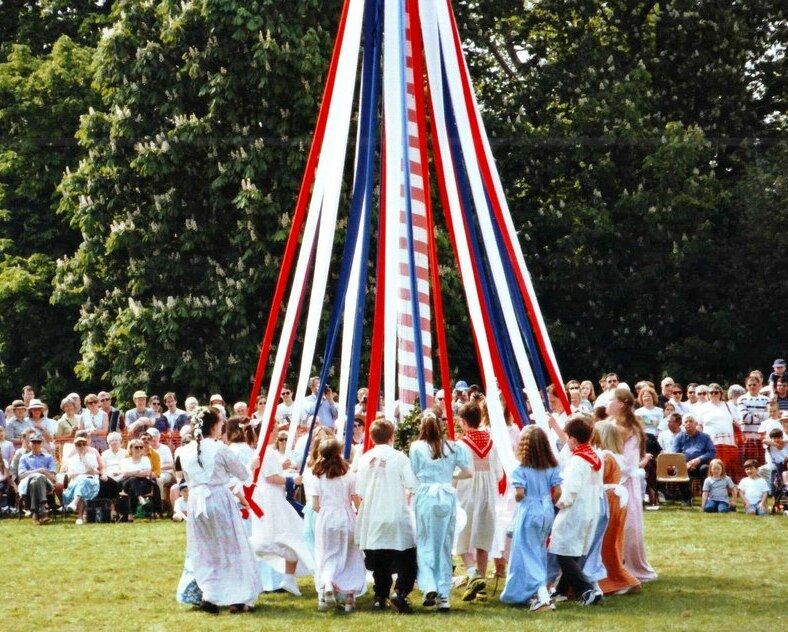
- Children dancing at the May Pole in 2002
- Frequency: Annual
- Locations: Ickwell, Bedfordshire, England
- Major events: Maypole dancing; Morris dancing
- Website: www.ickwellmayday.co.uk

Ickwell May Day is an annual celebration held in the village of Ickwell, Bedfordshire. The event is a celebration of May Day, a festival marking the beginning of summer, and has been celebrated from at least 1651. The festival includes elements of traditional English culture, such as morris and maypole dancing. Ickwell is unusual in having a permanent maypole, located on the village green, as well as including adult dancers in its maypole dancing.

== Background ==
May Day is an ancient European festival celebrating the beginning of summer, usually celebrated on 1 May. In England, the festival usually includes the crowning of a May Queen, and Morris dancing. Dancing around a maypole, a long trunk implanted in the ground, is common, with dancers plaiting ribbons attached to the pole to form patterns.

Ickwell is a village in the parish of Northill, in Bedfordshire, which had a population of 636 in the 2011 United Kingdom census. The name "Ickwell", meaning "Gicca's spring", was first recorded around 1170, and the village was the site of the Ickwell manor, which in 1639 comprised 487 acres in Northill parish.

== History ==
Churchwarden records concerning May Day in Ickwell date to 1561, where festivities including food, drink, minstrels, and Morris dancing were recorded. A record from 19 May 1563 lists costs "for all our Maye", which included spices and fruits for meat, brewing hops, wheat, three calves, a minstrel, gunpowder, and Morris coats and bells.

Ickwell is one of few villages in the United Kingdom to have a permanent maypole; in 1872, a larch pole sourced from Warden Warren, a forest in the nearby village of Old Warden, was erected on the village green. The pole was donated by Squire Thomas Hervey, owner of the nearby manor house Ickwell Bury, to celebrate the birth of his son. The pole was cemented in 6 feet of concrete, and had a height and circumference of 67 and 4 feet respectively. Before the instalment of the maypole, a pole had been put in place on the night before the May Day celebrations, and taken down on the night of May Day. The pole was replaced in 1911, again with a larch from Warden Warren, due to poor condition of the pole; May Day was not celebrated in 1910 due to this. The new pole was described as "broader but not quite so tall" in an account in the Bedfordshire Times, with a "brave coat of red and white paint, surmounted by a great Union Jack". In an 1877 will, Hervey directed three shillings and ten pence (equivalent to £26 in 2024) to be paid annually for the upkeep of the festival.

== Celebrations ==
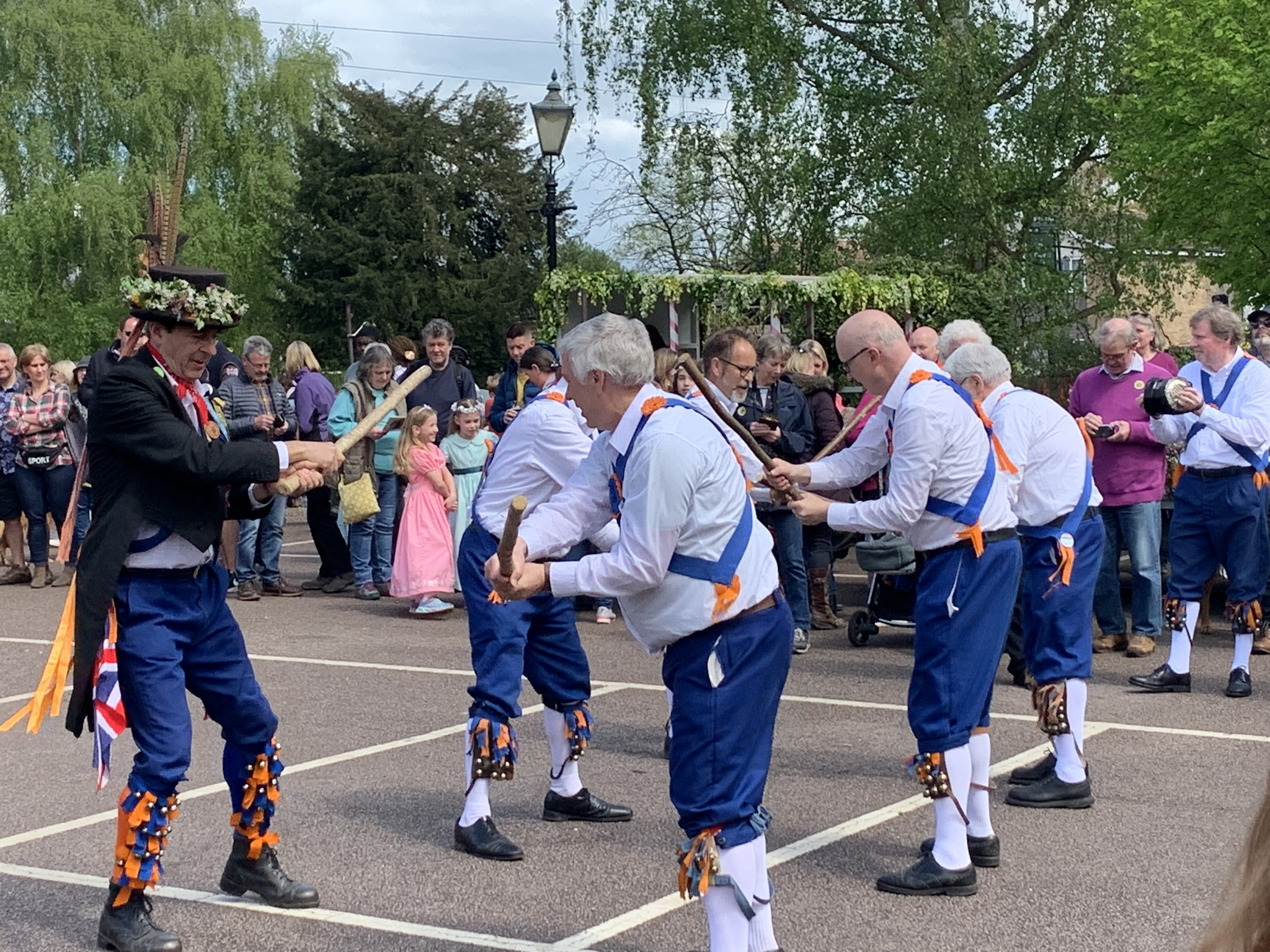
Morris Dancing in a pub in Northill at the 2023 Ickwell May Day celebrations

Celebrations begin with Morris dancing around the maypole early on 1 May – this dancing is largely unpublicised and primarily intended for the village. However, Ickwell May Day as an event occurs on the first bank holiday on the first Monday of the month. Stalls and a pageant are held at the event, alongside visiting dancing teams. A May Queen is crowned; every third year, the girl would be chosen from the village of Old Warden. Ickwell is unusual in its inclusion of adult maypole dancing – a group of 24 referred to as "Old Scholars", perform dances more intricate than younger dancers, such as Spider's Web and Gypsies' Tent.

In the Victorian era, villagers would gather May blossoms and leave garlands in doorways. These garlands often consisted of a cloth stretched over a wooden hoop, with two dolls, representing the Virgin Mary and the Christ Child, fastened in the centre of the cloth. The hoop had ribbons sewn around its frame, and flowers fastened to the cloth; children would stop at houses and charge money to see the garland. A procession through the village is held, led by characters known as the "Moggies"; these comprise the Sweep and his wife (both may have blackened faces), the Lord and the Lady, all four of whom are played by men. Originally, these characters would visit houses carrying garlands, may boughs, and besoms (a type of broom made from a bundle of twigs) asking for ale; they would sing a Day Song, returning the next day to ask for payment. The name "Moggies" is identified by Brian Shuel with the nearby village of Moggerhanger.
