= Upper Caldecote =

Village in Bedfordshire, England

Coordinates: 52.099°N 0.298°W

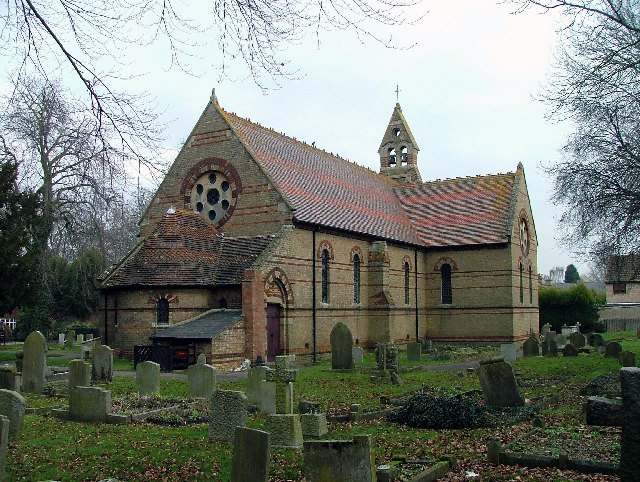
- All Saints' Church, Upper Caldecote

- Location within Bedfordshire
- Population: 1,218
- OS grid reference: TL167459
- Civil parish: Northill
- Unitary authority: Central Bedfordshire
- Ceremonial county: Bedfordshire
- Region: East
- Country: England
- Sovereign state: United Kingdom
- Post town: BIGGLESWADE
- Postcode district: SG18
- Dialling code: 01767
- Police: Bedfordshire
- Fire: Bedfordshire
- Ambulance: East of England
- UK Parliament: North Bedfordshire

Upper Caldecote is a village in the Central Bedfordshire district of Bedfordshire, England about 8 miles (13 km) south-east of Bedford.

Its population at the 2011 census was 1,218.

It is part of Northill civil parish.

Most of Upper Caldecote is situated directly to the west of the A1 road, with facilities including Caldecote CE Academy (a lower school), a post office, Anglican church, Methodist chapel, antiques shop, garage, G&M Growers, cricket club, football pitches and changing rooms, tennis courts, netball court, children's park and two newsagents.

The Anglican church of All Saints was built in 1867–8, in yellow brick with red brick banding and dressings, to designs of Arthur Blomfield.

== Geography ==
Upper Caldecote is 1.5 miles (2 km) north-west of Biggleswade, 19 miles (31 km) west south-west of Cambridge and 42 miles (68 km) north of London.

Landscape

The village lies within the Bedfordshire and Cambridgeshire Claylands (NCA 88) as designated by Natural England. Central Bedfordshire Council has locally classified the landscape as Lower Ivel Clay Valley (type 4B) where flat, open arable fields predominate.

Elevation

Upper Caldecote is 35 metres (115 ft) above sea level.

Geology, soil type and land use

The village lies on glacial gravel. The soil has low fertility, is freely draining and slightly acid with a loamy texture.

Roads and footpaths

Upper Caldecote is set along two main roads: north-south along Hitchin Road and east–west along Biggleswade Road.

A public footpath runs from the thatched weatherboarded cottage on the Biggleswade Road to Beeston. Another begins from opposite no. 49 Hitchin Road and joins a bridleway to Ickwell.

The night sky and light pollution

Light pollution is the level of radiance (night lights) shining up into the night sky. The Campaign to Protect Rural England (CPRE) divides the level of night sky brightness into 9 bands with band 1 being the darkest i.e. with the lowest level of light pollution and band 9 the brightest and most polluted. Upper Caldecote with an index of 1-2 nanoWatts (nW) is in band 4. The night sky brightens towards Biggleswade.

== Governance ==
Councillors are elected to Northill Parish Council and to represent Northill ward on the Central Bedfordshire Unitary Authority Council. Upper Caldecote is in the North Bedfordshire parliamentary constituency.

Prior to 1894, Upper Caldecote was administered as part of the hundred of Wixamtree. From 1894 until 1974 it was in Biggleswade Rural District and from 1974 to 2009 in Mid Bedfordshire District.

== Public transport ==
Bus route no. 74 to Biggleswade and Bedford is operated by Grant Palmer and runs most hours, morning to early evening, Monday to Saturday. Community bus operator Ivel Sprinter provides a service to Cambridge each Wednesday and Wanderbus a monthly service to St. Neots.

The nearest railway station is Biggleswade.

== Community and amenities ==
A post office branch is within the Londis store on Hitchin Road. A farm shop is also on Hitchin Road just before the B658 roundabout and a small convenience store is on Biggleswade Road.

All Saints Parish Church was consecrated by the Bishop of Ely in 1868. The Methodist Church was built in 1909. An antique shop occupies the former Wesleyan Chapel on Hitchin Road.

Caldecote Church of England Academy educates children from age 3 to 9. The Diocese of St Albans Multi-Academy Trust is the governing body.

Bedfordshire Archives and Record Service list five former beerhouses/public houses in the village. The last to close was the Rose & Crown in 2001.

== Sport ==
There is a playing field and sports pavilion maintained by the Caldecote Playing Fields Association charity.

Caldecote Football Club competes in the Bedfordshire County Football League Premier Division. The team have finished champions of the Premier Division a record nine times in all: in 1996–7, four times in a row from 1998–9 to 2001–2, 2004–5, 2005–6, 2008-9 and 2012–13. The Britannia Cup was won a record seven times between 1996-7 and 2009–10.

Caldecote Cricket Club finished top of the second division of the Bedfordshire County Cricket League in 2019.

== See also ==
- Lower Caldecote
