= Northill =

Village in Bedfordshire, England

Coordinates: 52.10569°N 0.32302°W

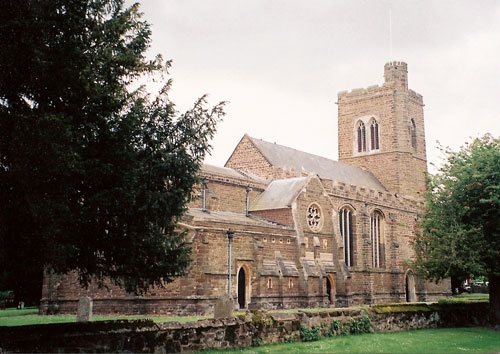
- Church of St Mary the Virgin

- Location within Bedfordshire
- Population: 2,288 (2001); 2,270 (2011 Census)
- OS grid reference: TL149465
- Civil parish: Northill
- Unitary authority: Central Bedfordshire
- Ceremonial county: Bedfordshire
- Region: East
- Country: England
- Sovereign state: United Kingdom
- Post town: BIGGLESWADE
- Postcode district: SG18
- Dialling code: 01767
- Police: Bedfordshire
- Fire: Bedfordshire
- Ambulance: East of England
- UK Parliament: NE Bedfordshire

Northill is a village and civil parish in the Central Bedfordshire district of the county of Bedfordshire, England about 6.5 miles (10 km) southeast of the county town of Bedford.

The 2011 census showed the population for Northill village as 338 and for the civil parish, 2,270.

The parish includes the villages of Ickwell and Upper Caldecote, as well as the hamlets of Budna, Hatch, Lower Caldecote and Thorncote Green.

Northill has a small village green with duck pond, owned by the parish council.

== Geography ==
Northill is 2 miles (3 km) west southwest of Sandy, 3 miles (5 km) west northwest of Biggleswade, 20 miles (32 km) southwest of Cambridge and 42 miles (68 km) north of Central London.

Area

The civil parish covers an area of 1,638 hectares (4,048 acres). Its eastern boundary is the River Ivel.

Landscape

Topographically, Northill stands on a slightly elevated ridge that runs north to south. The village lies on the border of the Bedfordshire and Cambridgeshire Claylands and the Bedfordshire Greensand Ridge; National Character Areas designated by Natural England. Central Bedfordshire Council has classified the local landscape around the village as within the Mid Greensand Ridge. The surrounding area is mostly arable farmland but there are significant areas of woodland to the west of the village, and parkland at Ickwell. The north and east of the parish form part of the predominantly flat, Lower Ivel Clay Valley.

Elevation

The village centre is 34 metres (112 ft) above sea level. The east of the parish is flat and ranges between 21 metres (69 ft) and 26 metres (85 ft). The land rises westwards to reach 70 metres (230 ft).

Geology and soil type

Northill village lies mainly on Oxford clay overlying Kellaways beds. Patches of glacial gravel (till) and boulder clay are to the west of the village. The eastern and northern parts of the parish lie on glacial gravel, and alongside the Ivel are superficial deposits of first and second terrace river gravel and alluvium. Ickwell lies on Ampthill Clay. Around the village the soil is highly fertile, lime-rich, loamy and clayey with impeded drainage. The eastern area of the parish has soil of low fertility, which is freely draining and slightly acid with a loamy texture.

The night sky and light pollution

Light pollution is the level of radiance (night lights) shining up into the night sky. The Campaign to Protect Rural England (CPRE) divides the level of night sky brightness into 9 bands with band 1 being the darkest i.e. with the lowest level of light pollution and band 9 the brightest and most polluted. Northill is in band 4. Darker sky is to the west but it is lighter towards Sandy and Biggleswade.

The built environment

Along Thorncote Road, Northill are a number of grade II listed, 17th and 18th century thatched cottages of timber-frame construction with colour washed brick and render. A pair of timber framed, clay tiled gambrel roofed, colour washed roughcast rendered cottages date to about 1800. At the junction of Thorncote, Bedford and Ickwell Roads stands Northill Grange. It has a double pile plan; i.e. there are two buildings under separate roofs one behind the other. On Ickwell Road are a pair of early 19th century timber-framed cottages with weatherboarding and a clay tile roof.

Public footpaths

The Greensand Ridge Walk passes through the village and Home Wood.

== History ==
Part of the ancient hundred of Wixamtree, the village was originally known as North Givell, meaning the northern part of territory of the River Ivel. A similar version of this place-name is first evidenced in the Domesday Book of 1086 which reads: Nortigble/Nortgiue(le): Pirot and Ralph from Eudo FitzHubert, Walter from Hugh de Beauchamp; William Speke. 1 1/2 mills. A variation of this spelling is "North Yevell" as seen in a 1440s legal record.

The core of the village's buildings date back to the 14th century. To this day many examples of thatched roofing exist around Northill.

Among the buildings stemming from the 14th century is the village's Anglican Church of St Mary, which is built of ironstone and has been extensively restored over the subsequent centuries. The church itself contains fine examples of 17th-century painted glass.

Sir Humphrey Winch, Lord Chief Justice of Ireland, was born here in 1555.

In Home Wood is a largely undisturbed, well preserved medieval fishery. Alongside are earthworks of a sizeable artificial warren. The site is a scheduled monument managed by the Forestry Commission.

Northill was the baptismal place, and possibly the birthplace, of clockmaker Thomas Tompion, who built the Pump Room Clock in 1709 that has since seen active service in the city of Bath. Thomas Tompion's father was the village blacksmith, whose forge can still be seen on the Green at Ickwell.

== Governance ==
Northill Parish Council consists of 12 elected councillors.

The village is part of Northill ward for elections to the Central Bedfordshire Unitary Authority.

Prior to 1894, Northill was administered as part of the hundred of Wixamtree. From 1894 until 1974 it was in Biggleswade Rural District and from 1974 to 2009 in Mid Bedfordshire District.

Northill is in the North East Bedfordshire parliamentary constituency of the House of Commons of the UK Parliament.

== Public transport ==
Bus route 74 to Bedford and Biggleswade operated by Grant Palmer runs hourly, daytime Monday to Saturday. Community bus operator, Ivel Sprinter runs a weekly service to Cambridge.

The nearest railway station is Sandy.

== Education ==
The Oak Farm and Sweet Briars Cottage areas are in the catchment zone for Robert Bloomfield Academy. Those same communities are in the catchment zone for Samuel Whitbread Academy, which has upper secondary and sixth form.

Masquerades Youth Theatre Group is a Bedfordshire-based performing arts group providing extra-curricular drama, dance, singing and musical theatre training for children through to adults. Founded in 2004 in Northill by Karen Woodcock, the group began as a small Saturday morning drama class and has since expanded to offer a wide range of classes across Northill and surrounding areas. Classes are currently held in Northill and surrounding areas; Cople, Great Barford, Caldecote and Moggerhanger.

== Events and amenities ==
The Crown public house next to St Mary's Church, dates back to the 17th century. The property is partly timber-framed and partly brick, with a colour washed roughcast render throughout. The roofs are made of old clay tiles.

Northill Village Hall was built in the 1970s.

Northill is the starting place of the Ickwell May Day celebration that sees local floats and residents travel the mile or so to the neighbouring village of Ickwell. The May Day celebration has been held since 1565.

Masquerades Youth Theatre Group, a performing arts organisation founded in Northill, provides drama and dance training for children and young people, and stages regular productions involving participants from the village and surrounding areas.
