= Broom =

Cleaning tool for floor

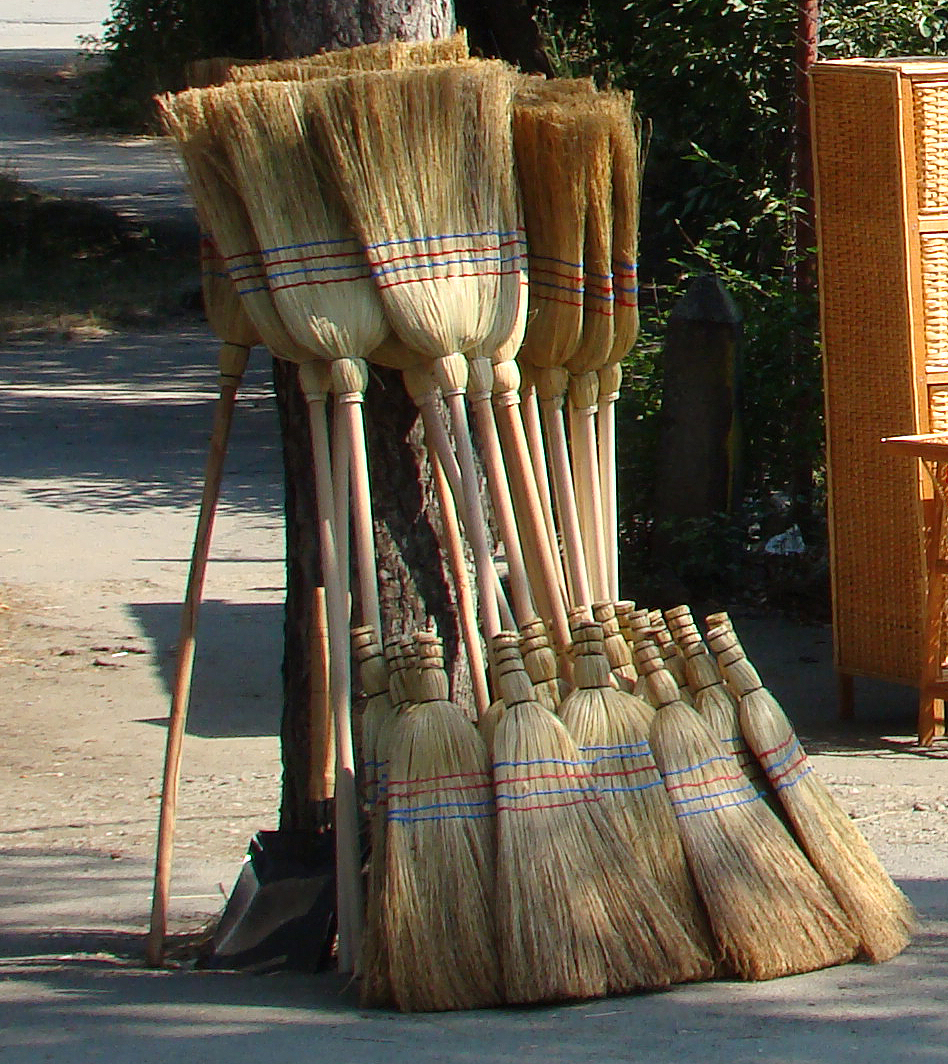
Sorghum-made brooms with long handles as well as short handles

A broom (/bruːm/), also known as a broomstick, is a cleaning tool, consisting of usually stiff fibers (often made of materials such as plastic, glued hair, or corn husks) attached to, and roughly parallel to, a cylindrical handle, the broomstick. It is thus a variety of brush with a long handle. It is commonly used in combination with a dustpan.

A distinction is made between a "hard broom" and a "soft broom" and a spectrum in between. Soft brooms are used in some cultures chiefly for sweeping walls of cobwebs, like a "feather duster", while hard brooms are for rougher tasks like sweeping dirt off sidewalks or concrete floors, or even smoothing and texturing wet concrete. The majority of brooms are somewhere in between, suitable for sweeping the floors of homes and businesses, soft enough to be flexible and to move even light dust, but stiff enough to achieve a firm sweeping action.

The broom is also a symbolic object associated with witchcraft and ceremonial magic.

Video of a Japanese construction worker cleaning up his construction site with a broom

== Etymology ==
The word broom derives from types of shrubs referred to as brooms. Common broom typically refers to whatever shrub is most commonly used to make the bristles for a broomstick in a given region. In 15th-century Late Middle English, the word broom began to be used for household implements made by fixing twigs of the broom plant or heather onto long handles, and it gradually replaced the earlier word besom as the generic term for similar implements during the Early Modern English period. The song Buy Broom Buzzems (by William Purvis, 1752–1832) still refers to the "broom besom" as one type of besom (i.e. "a besom made from broom").

Flat brooms, made of broom corn, were invented by Shakers in the 19th century with the invention of the broom vice. A smaller whisk broom or brush is sometimes called a duster.

== Function ==
Brooms are used to clean dust and ash. They may be used to clean homes, appliances such as ovens and fireplaces, or outdoor areas such as streets and yards.

== History ==
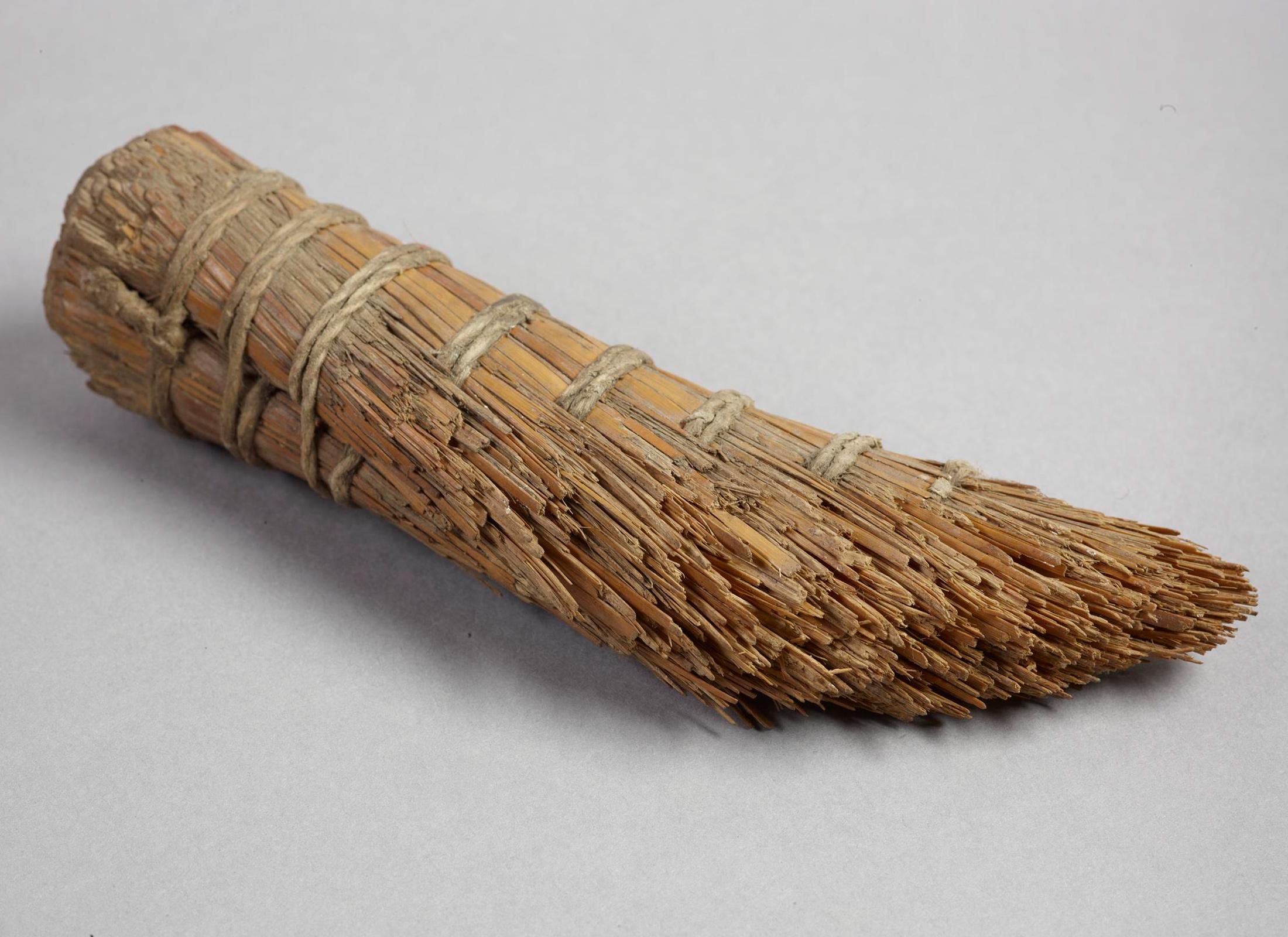
Broom excavated from Dunhuang, China, dated 200 BCE – 200 CE. Kept in the British Museum.

The history of the broom dates back to ancient Mesopotamia around 4000 B.C. They were made from branches bound together with herbs. Initially, they were short and lacked a handle; over time, however, the design evolved and became more manageable with the addition of a stick or pole.

The earliest brooms and brushes are from prehistory, when things such as bird wings and burs were fastened to handles of bone, ivory, or wood. The indigenous peoples of the Southwestern United States created brooms from yucca plants for cleaning pueblos. The indigenous people of Saint Lucia created brooms from coconut fronds for cleaning around hearths. Brooms are mentioned in the 1540 manuscript Codex Mendoza of the Aztecs, which instructs girls to sweep.

The birch besom was made by fastening twigs to a handle with a strip of ash wood, harvested from a log after washing it in a running stream. The besom became a symbol of breweries in England, where brewers used it as a whisk while fermenting alcoholic beverages, and the brooms were typically displayed by pubs. When not in use, a brewer's besom was stored and dried on wall pegs or hanging by a leather cord. The broom was not washed so that yeast would remain in the bristles for future uses. Hearth besoms were created in Ireland to keep ash on a hearth. Until the 18th century, brooms were crafted by hand.

In 1797, the quality of brooms changed when Levi Dickenson, a farmer in Hadley, Massachusetts, made a broom for his wife, using the tassels of sorghum, a grain he was growing for the seeds. His wife spread good words around town, creating demand for Dickenson's sorghum brooms. The sorghum brooms held up well, but ultimately, like all brooms, fell apart. Dickenson subsequently invented a machine that would make better brooms, and faster than he could. In 1810, the foot treadle broom machine was invented. This machine played an integral part in the Industrial Revolution.

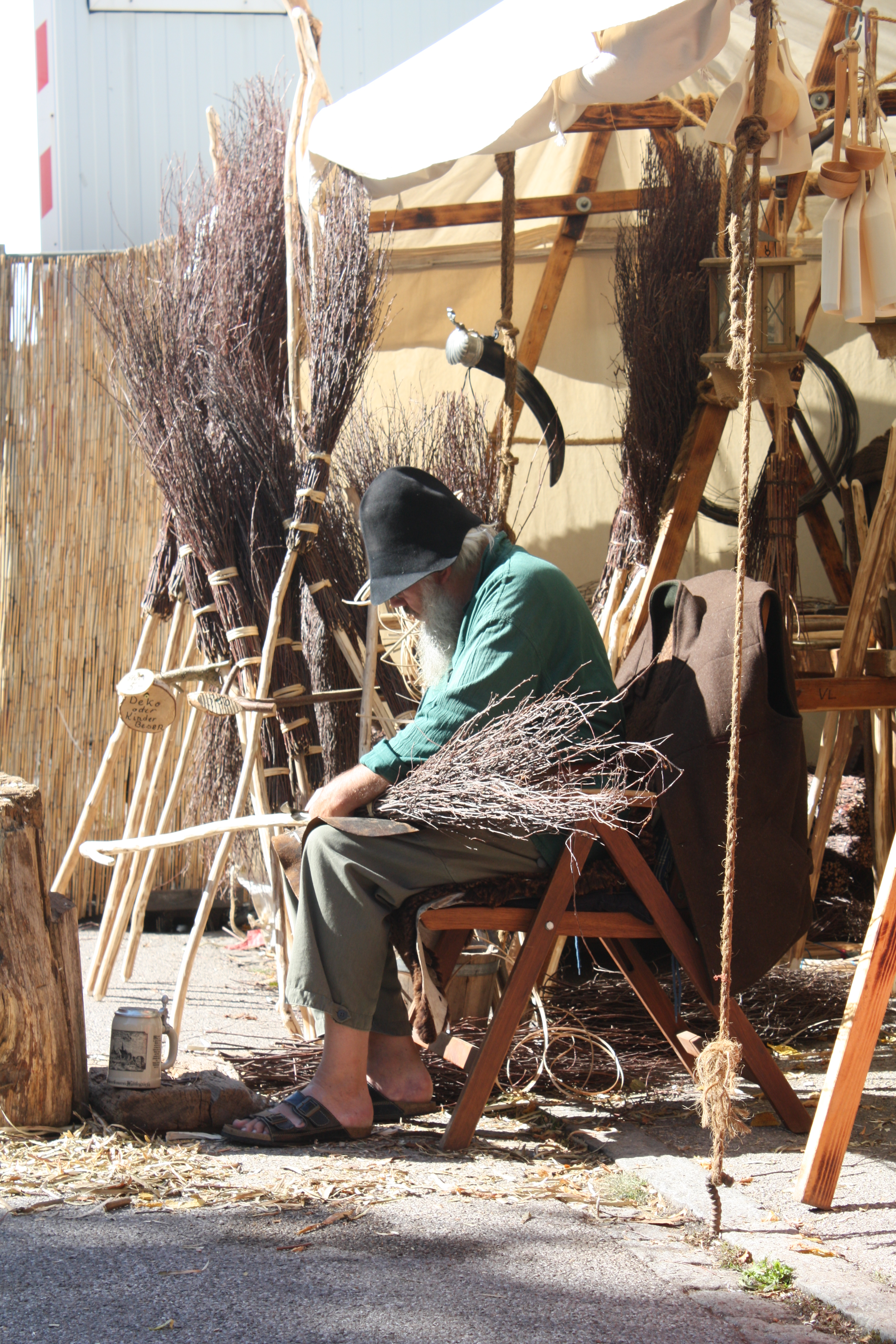
Making brooms, 2012

The Shakers began growing broom corn to create brooms in the present-day United States, which they crafted on treadle wheels and stored hanging on the wall under a cotton hood. The Shaker Theodore Bates invented the flat broom in 1798. Benjamin Franklin grew French broom, a practice which was then taken up by Thomas Jefferson, who had broomsticks made from the plant. Americans commonly kept brooms with their fireplaces by the early 19th century. At this time, brooms were often made by children, the disabled, the elderly, and slaves. By the middle of the century, brooms were created in factories with machine presses, trimmers, and winding machines and then sold door-to-door. People in the American frontier crafted brooms with a wet rawhide fastening, which dried and hardened around the bristles.

Henry Hadley invented a hybridized machine-harvested broom corn at the University of Illinois in 1983 for more efficient creation of brooms. Modern factory-made brooms are made with straw bristles, which are flattened and stitched together before a handle is inserted. In industrialized countries, brooms are sometimes replaced or superseded by powered cleaning instruments such as leaf blowers and vacuum cleaners. Brooms remain commonly used for cleaning purposes in the 21st century.

One source mentions that the United States had 303 broom factories by 1839 and that the number peaked at 1,039 in 1919. Most of these were in the Eastern United States; during the Great Depression in the 1930s, the number of factories declined to 320 in 1939. The state of Oklahoma became a major center for broom production because broom corn grew especially well there, with The Oklahoma Broom Corn Company opening a factory in El Reno in 1906. Faced with competition from imported brooms and synthetic bristles, most of the factories closed by the 1960s.

== Design and types ==
A broom is made up of two parts: the handle, which is a long cylindrical stick, and the stiff fibers lined parallel at its base.

The United States International Cooperation Administration made a distinction between brooms based on bristle quality. Parlor brooms are made of smooth green fibers and typically have brushes 14 to 18 inches long. Carpet brooms are a cheaper variant of the parlor broom that uses bristles rejected for use in parlor brooms for being off-color or lower quality. Standard brooms use bristles that were deemed too low-quality for either parlor brooms or carpet brooms, often dyed green to emulate other brooms. Hearth brooms, or toy brooms, are made of miscellaneous fibers that cannot be used in other brooms. They are not typically sold as consumer products.

Warehouse brooms use heavier fibers such as rattan or palmyra palm and are bound with metal. Different grades of warehouse broom are used to denote the surface it is designed for, such as smelters, decks, or railroads. Their brushes measure about 16 to 18 inches long.

Cob brooms are used to clean webs from high areas and were historically made with round brushes. Whisk brooms use bristles that are shorter and finer than other brooms. Rubber brooms were created in the early 20th century to prevent the debris raised when sweeping with straw brooms.

== Materials and production ==
=== Brush ===
The brush of a broom is most commonly made with the fibers of broom corn. Other common plant materials used in brooms include palmyra, rice straw, rice root, piassava, grass, sedge, and twigs. They may use a mix of materials, with lower quality fibers filling out the brush. Broom making involves botanical knowledge, particularly about broom plants.

For manufactured brooms, the fibers are sorted by quality and fitted into the appropriate type of broom. They are then put through an evener to align the fibers, a saw to remove stems, and a scraper to break open the straw and remove the seeds. The fibers are dyed or bleached to achieve a uniform color, or they are wetted if they are already high quality so they can be more easily wound. The outer fibers of the brush are typically treated with a dye, called broom crystals, to preserve the color after use.

As an alternative to plant fibers, brooms can be fitted with synthetic brushes made of materials like nylon or plastic.

=== Handle and fastening ===
Wooden broom handles are commonly made from hardwood or fir. Commercial wood broom handles are painted or finished. Lacquers can increase the lifespan of the broom's handle in addition to serving an aesthetic purpose. Wooden broom handles are often about 42 inches long and seven-eighths to one and one-eighth inches in diameter.

Metal tension wires, sometimes crafted specifically for use in brooms, are put through a winding machine to fasten the bristles to the handle. The wire is wound through a hole in the handle before fastening the brush, typically over the last six inches of the handle. Additional bristles are added to the sides for a flat brush shape and to provide a surface for sweeping. The stem ends of the fibers are then cut and tapered and the wire is nailed into the handle. The wire is then finished by one of several methods, such as with a metal cap, with a velvet coat, or by being tapered. After the broom is wired, the fibers can again be scraped or seeded.

Twine, often made of cotton or linen, is used to stitch the brush. At least five stitches will typically be used. The outside of the brush may be wrapped with a material like leather, replacing a twine band used to hold the brush together during manufacturing.

Commercially sold brooms may apply a glued label to the fastening with the brand name or broom model, which can be used as a cover for the clamp marks left by a wiring machine.

== Culture ==
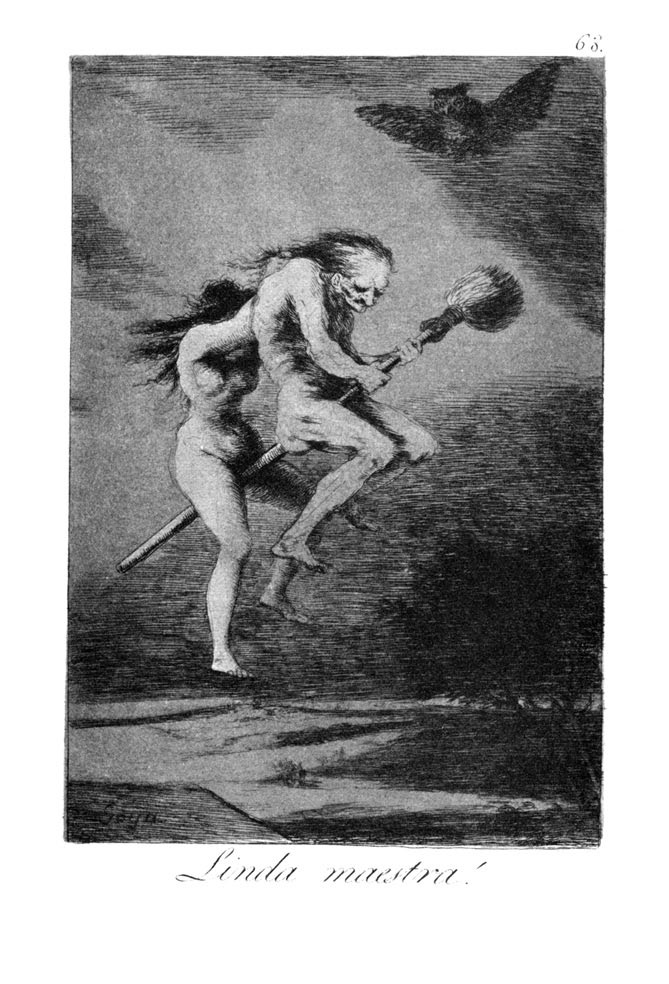
Francisco Goya's Los Caprichos: ¡Linda maestra! ("The Follies: Beautiful Teacher!") – witches heading to a Sabbath on a broomstick

=== Witchcraft ===
In the context of witchcraft, broomstick is likely to refer to the broom as a whole, traditionally known as a besom. The first known reference to witches flying on broomsticks dates to the 11th-century Islamic traditionalist theologian Ibn Qudamah in his book al-Mughnī (The Enricher). The first reference to witches flying on broomsticks in Europe dates to 1453, confessed by the male witch Guillaume Edelin. The concept of a flying ointment used by witches appears at about the same time, recorded in 1456.

In the 1797 poem "Der Zauberlehrling" ("The Sorcerer's Apprentice") by Johann Wolfgang von Goethe, the titular apprentice brings a broom to life to do his chore of filling a well full of water. The broom overdoes its job and when chopped into pieces, each splinter becomes a new broom that flood the room until the apprentice's master, the sorcerer, stops them. The poem was set to music by Paul Dukas, which in turn inspired (and provided the soundtrack to) an animated short by Disney in the 1940 film Fantasia, starring Mickey Mouse. The Disney brooms have had recurring cameos in Disney media, mostly portrayed as janitors, albeit not out of control or causing chaos such as in the original appearance.

In Metro-Goldwyn-Mayer's 1939 film The Wizard of Oz, the Wicked Witch of the West uses a broomstick to fly over Oz. She also uses it to skywrite "Surrender Dorothy" above the Emerald City. The Wizard commands Dorothy and her three traveling companions to bring the Wicked Witch's broomstick to him in order to grant their wishes. Dorothy carries it to the Wizard with the Scarecrow, Tin Man, and Lion after the Wicked Witch's death.

Flying witches' brooms also appear in the 1971 film Bedknobs and Broomsticks and the 1993 film Hocus Pocus.

In Eswatini (Swaziland), witches' broomsticks are short bundles of sticks tied together without a handle.

In J. K. Rowling's Harry Potter novels and film adaptations, broomsticks are a common form of transport for wizards and witches. These are also used for the magical sport of Quidditch, in which players use their broomsticks to fly around a field and shoot goals.

Flying brooms, along with flying carpets, are the main means of transportation in the world of Poul Anderson's novel Operation Chaos.

The Flying Broom (Turkish: Uçan Süpürge) is a feminist organization in Turkey, deliberately evoking the associations of a flying broom with witches.

=== Cultural traditions ===
Brooms are used in some rituals.

Jumping the broom is a tradition sometimes practiced in African American weddings in which the couple leaps over a broom to symbolically represent the leap into domestic life. The tradition was practiced by enslaved Americans and other groups of low social class in the United States through the 19th century. It was revitalized by Alex Haley after it was prominently featured in his novel Roots: The Saga of an American Family in 1976 and became part of a broader reclamation of Black heritage at the time. Other marginalized groups, such as the Celts and the Romani, have historically been described as practicing similar traditions in Britain. The precise origin of jumping the broom is uncertain.

The Métis people of Canada have a broom dancing tradition. There are broom dancing exhibitions where people show off their broom dancing skills. The lively broom dance involves fast footwork and jumping.

During World War II, American submarine crews would tie a broom to their boat's conning tower when returning to port to indicate that they had "swept" the seas clean of enemy shipping. The tradition has been devalued in recent years by submarine crews who fly a broom simply when returning from their boat's shake-down cruise. This tradition may stem from the action of the Dutch admiral Maarten Tromp who tied a broom to his main mast after defeating the British admiral Robert Blake at the Battle of Dungeness in 1652. This has often been interpreted as a message that he would "sweep the British from the seas". This story remains unsubstantiated, but may have its origin in the tradition of hoisting a broom as a sign that a ship was for sale, which seems more likely as Tromp had captured two of Blake's ships in the battle.

In Bhojpuri, it is called Baṛhanī (prosperer), as it is believed that it's prospers the family and house.

=== Literature ===
In 1701 Jonathan Swift wrote a "Meditation Upon a Broomstick", a parody of Robert Boyle's Occasional Reflections upon Several Subjects:

But a Broom-Stick, perhaps you will say, is an Emblem of a Tree standing on its Head; and pray what is Man, but a Topsy-turvey Creature, his Animal Faculties perpetually mounted on his Rational; His Head where his Heels should be, groveling on the Earth, and yet with all his Faults, he sets up to be an universal Reformer and Corrector of Abuses, a Remover of Grievances, rakes into every Sluts Corner of Nature, bringing hidden Corruptions to the Light, and raises a mighty Dust where there was none before, sharing deeply all the while, in the very same Pollutions he pretends to sweep away: His last Days are spent in Slavery to Women, and generally the least deserving; till worn to the Stumps, like his Brother Bezom, he is either kickt out of Doors, or made use of to kindle Flames, for others to warm themselves by.

=== Politics ===
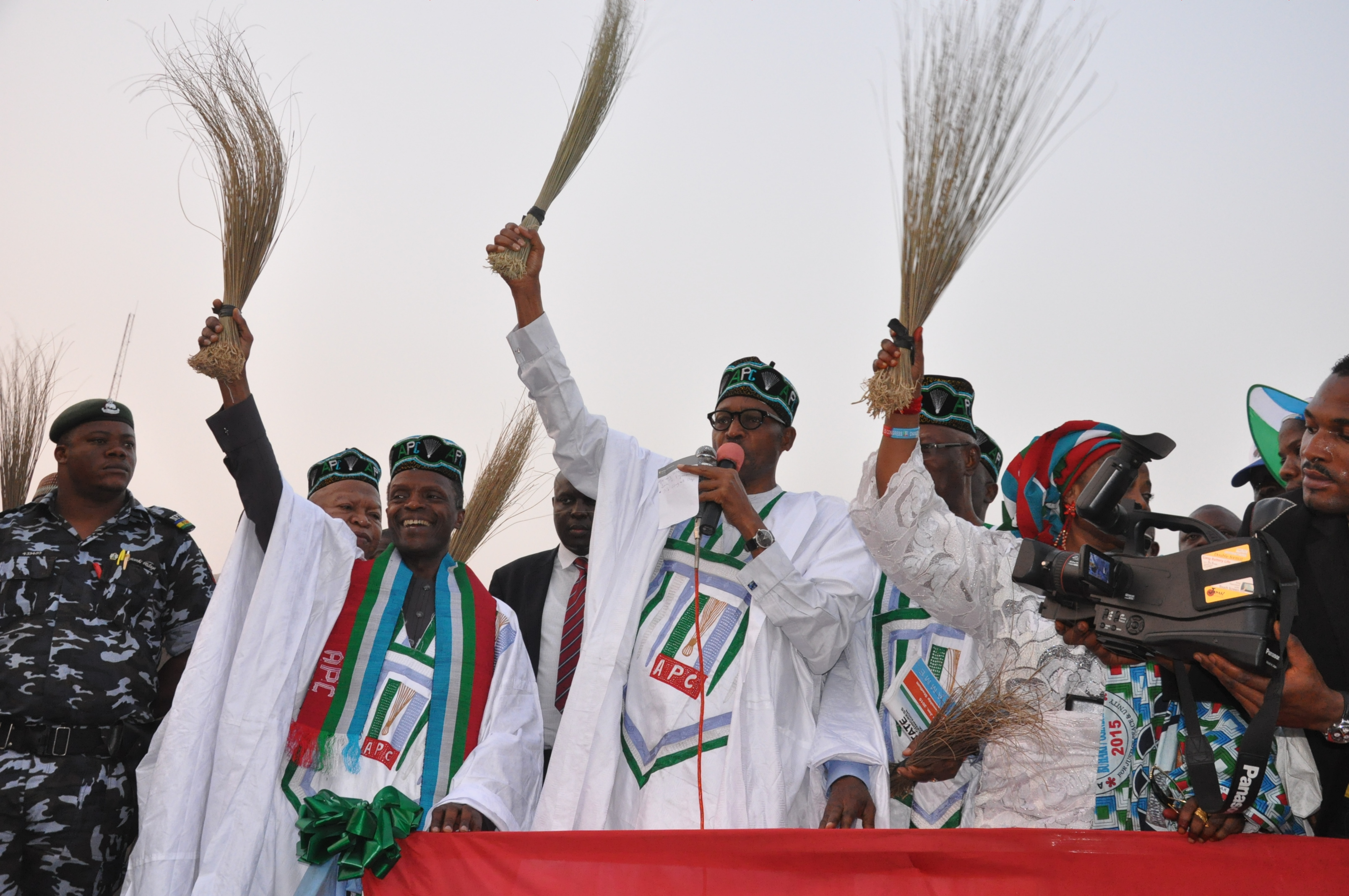
Nigerian opposition politicians holding brooms at a campaign rally

For much of the 20th century, political cartoons and propaganda would often depict new or oncoming leaders sweeping away old, corrupt or unpopular figures.

The broom is used as a symbol of the following political parties:

- Aam Aadmi Party, India
- All Progressives Congress, Nigeria

=== Religion ===
In Jainism, monks and nuns have a little broom with them, in order to gently brush aside ants and small animals, to avoid crushing them. This is part of observing the principle of Ahinsā.

The Shakers are often credited with the invention of the flat broom.

=== Sports ===
In curling, a curling broom is used to sweep the ice surface as the stone slides towards the target area.

In baseball and basketball, when the home team is close to accomplishing a sweep (having won the first two games of a three-game series or first three games of a four-game series), some fans will bring brooms to the ballpark and brandish them as a way of taunting the visiting team (examples: Arkansas vs. LSU, 2011; Red Sox vs. Yankees, May 13–15, 2011 and June 7–9, 2011).

In broomball, broomsticks have their heads removed and are used to push a ball into a goal, on an ice surface. The game is similar to hockey, except players do not wear skates.

== Image gallery ==
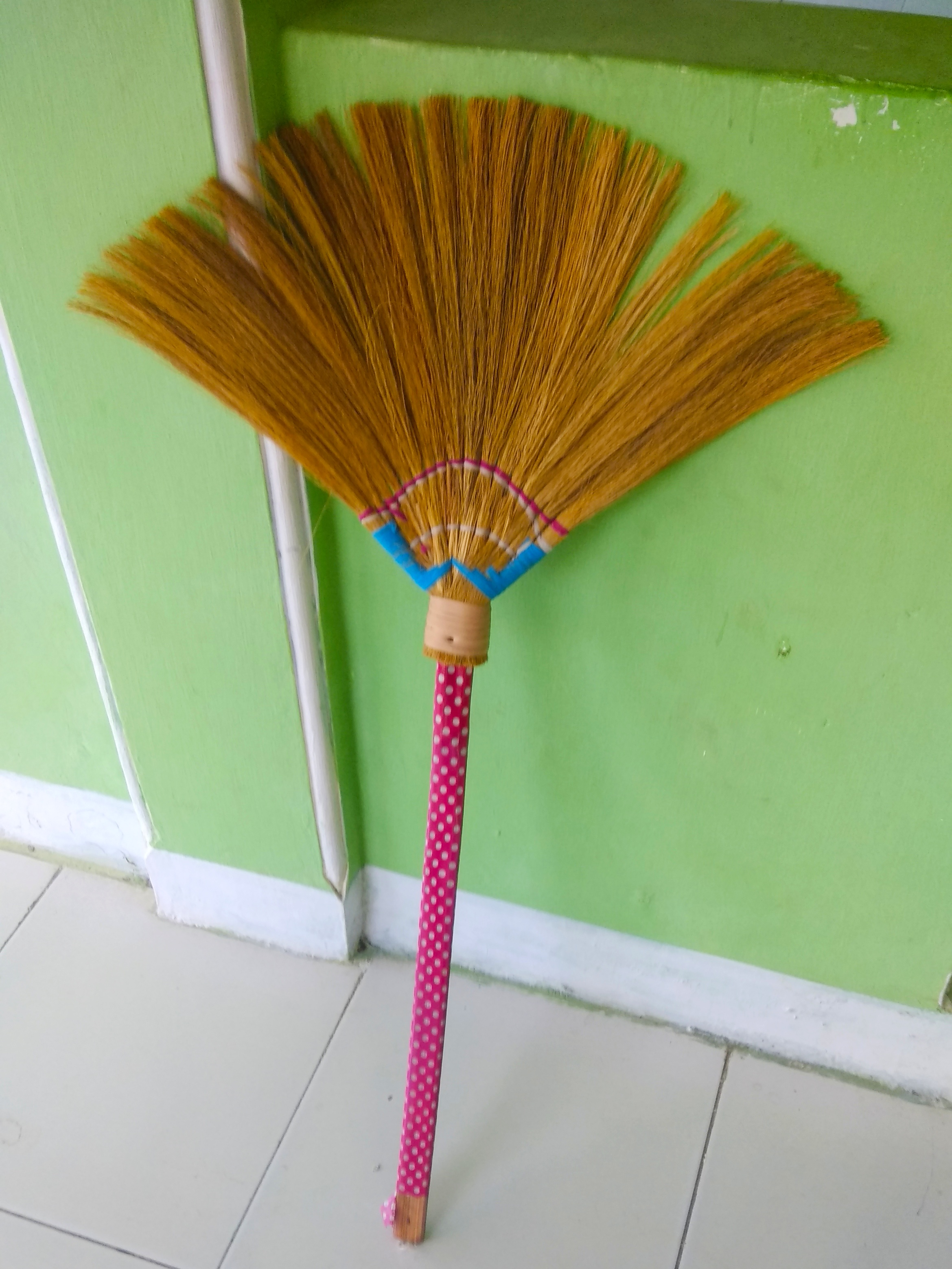
Common soft broom in Indonesia

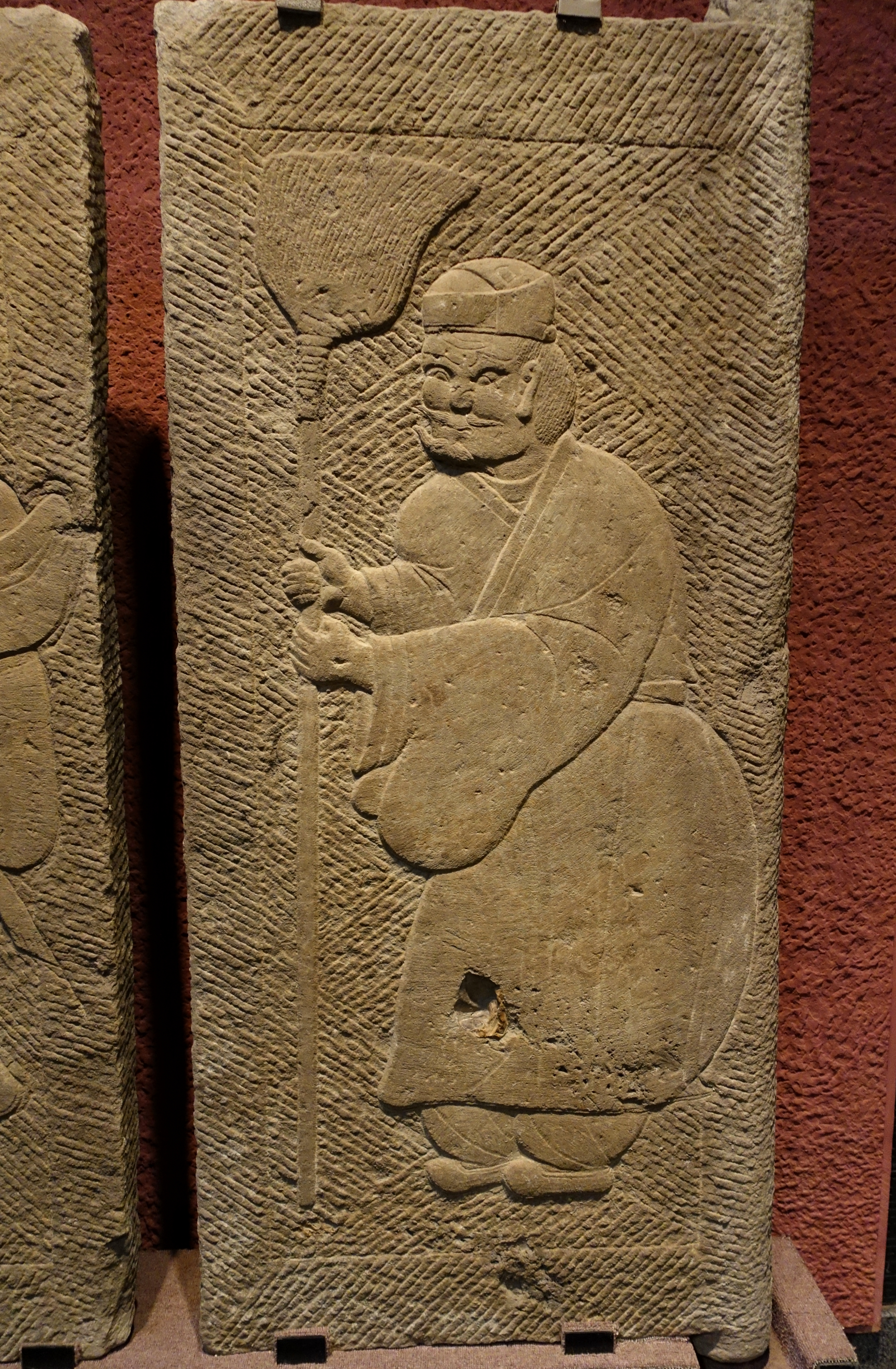
Carved reliefs on stone tomb doors showing a man dressed in Hanfu and holding a broom, Chinese Eastern Han dynasty (25–220 AD), from Lanjia Yard, Pi County, Sichuan province, Sichuan Provincial Museum of Chengdu, China

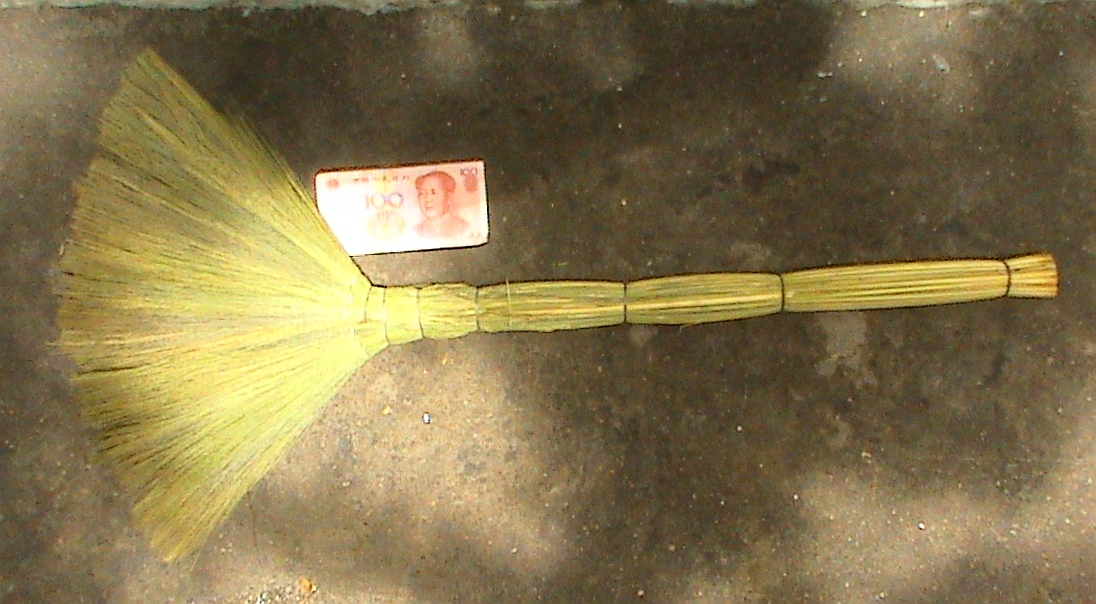
A soft broom commonly used in Hainan Province, China

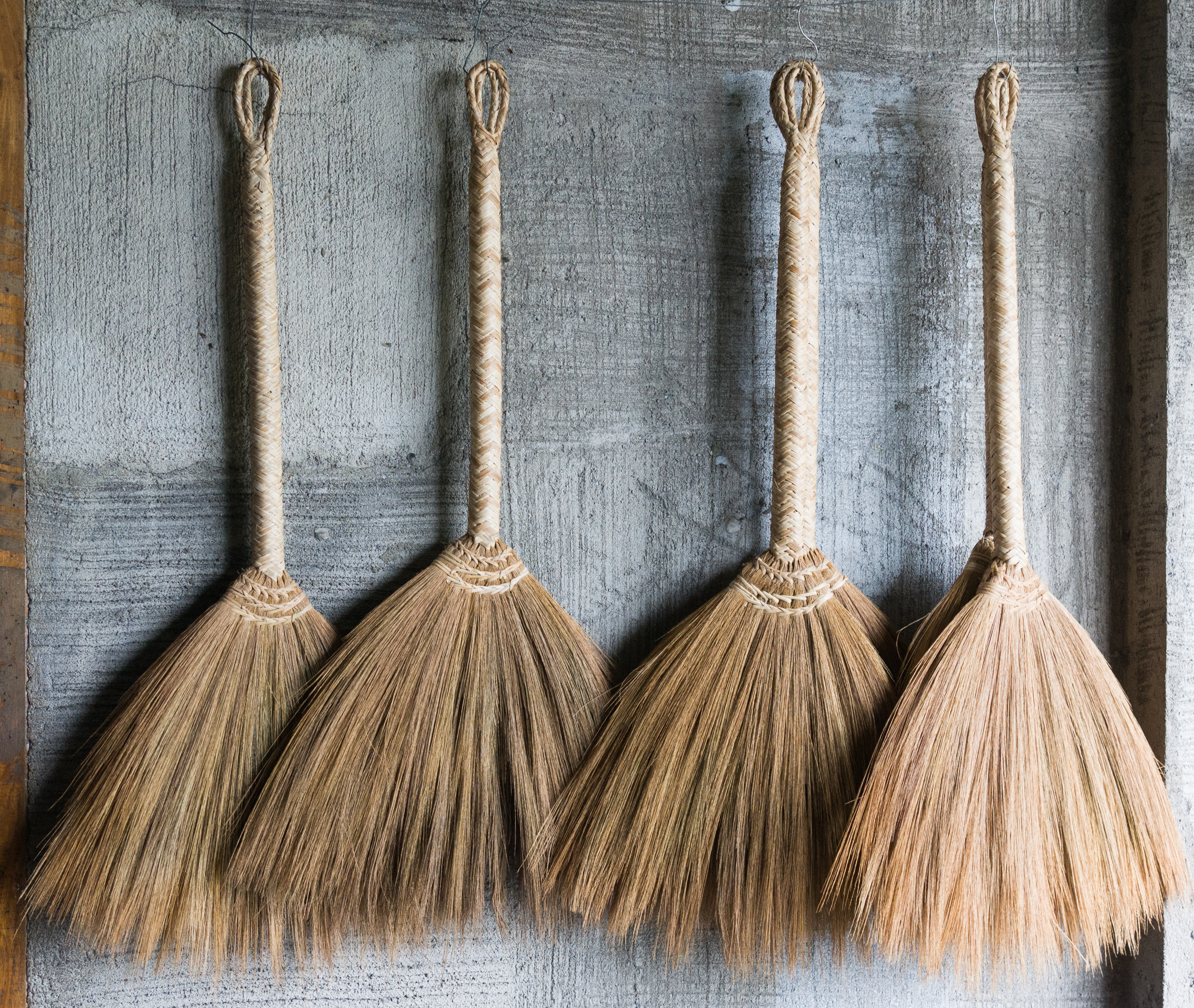
Typical Filipino soft brooms (walís-tambô), Banaue, Ifugao, Philippines

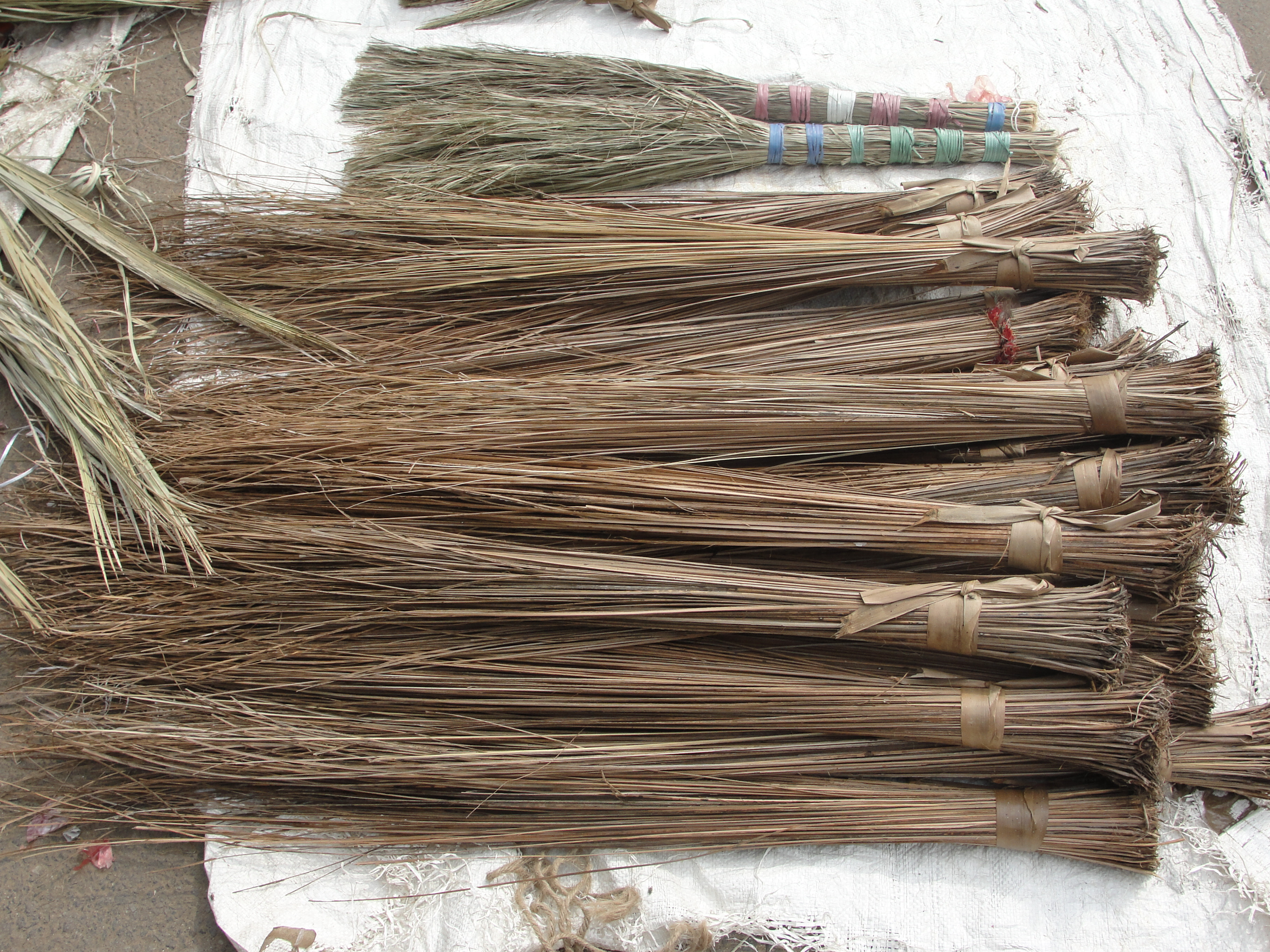
A hard-broom (walís-tingtíng) stall in the Philippines. Philippine hard brooms are often made from the hard primary veins of the leaves of the coconut palm frond.

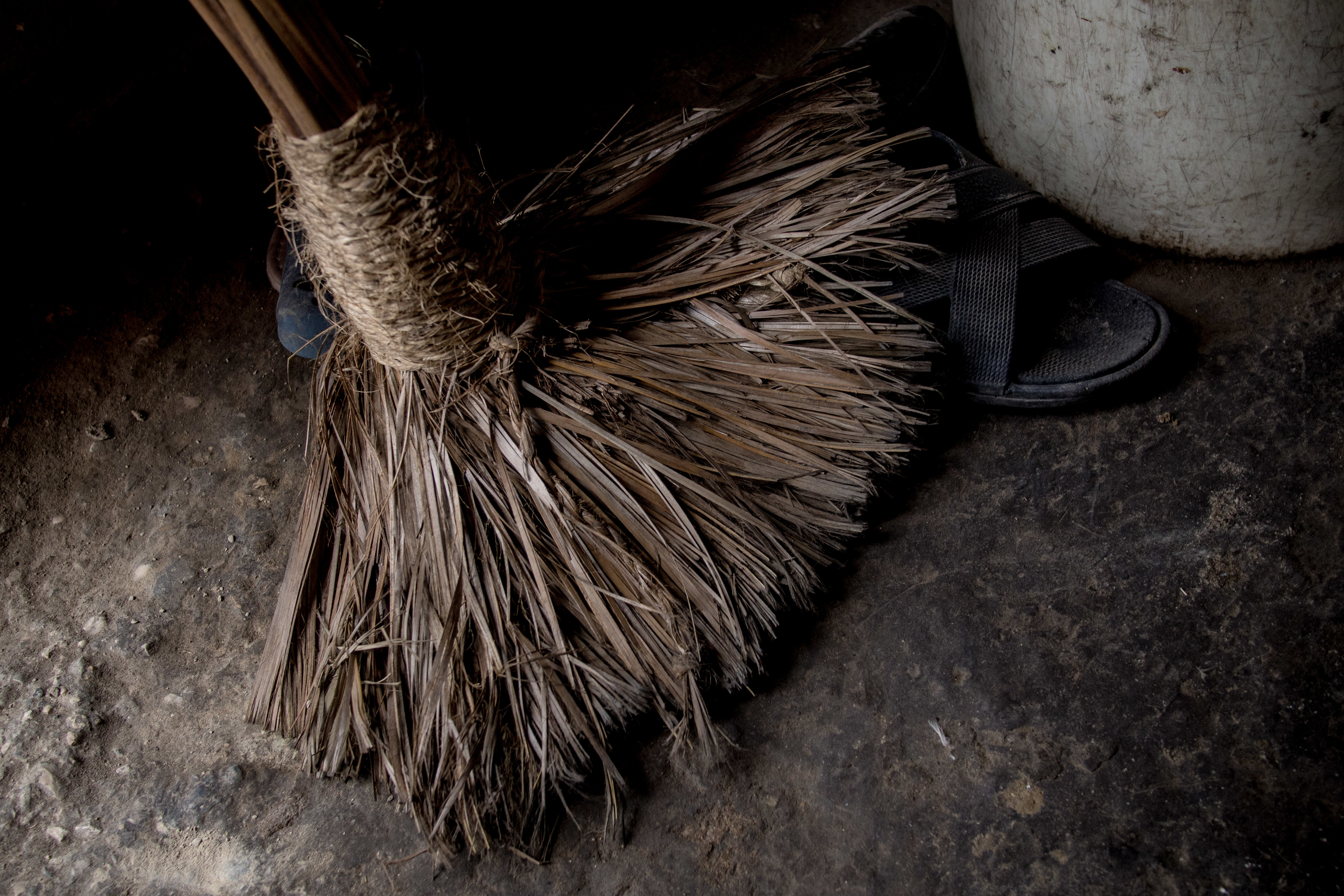
A typical broom at a home in Haiti

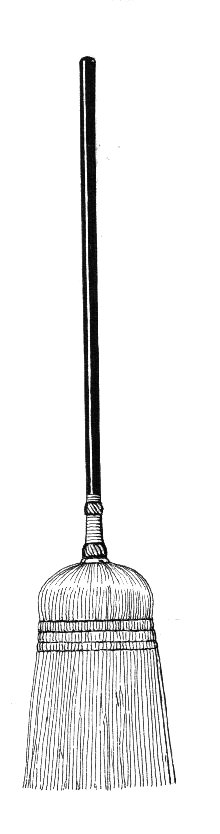
A broom with bristles traditionally made using broom corn

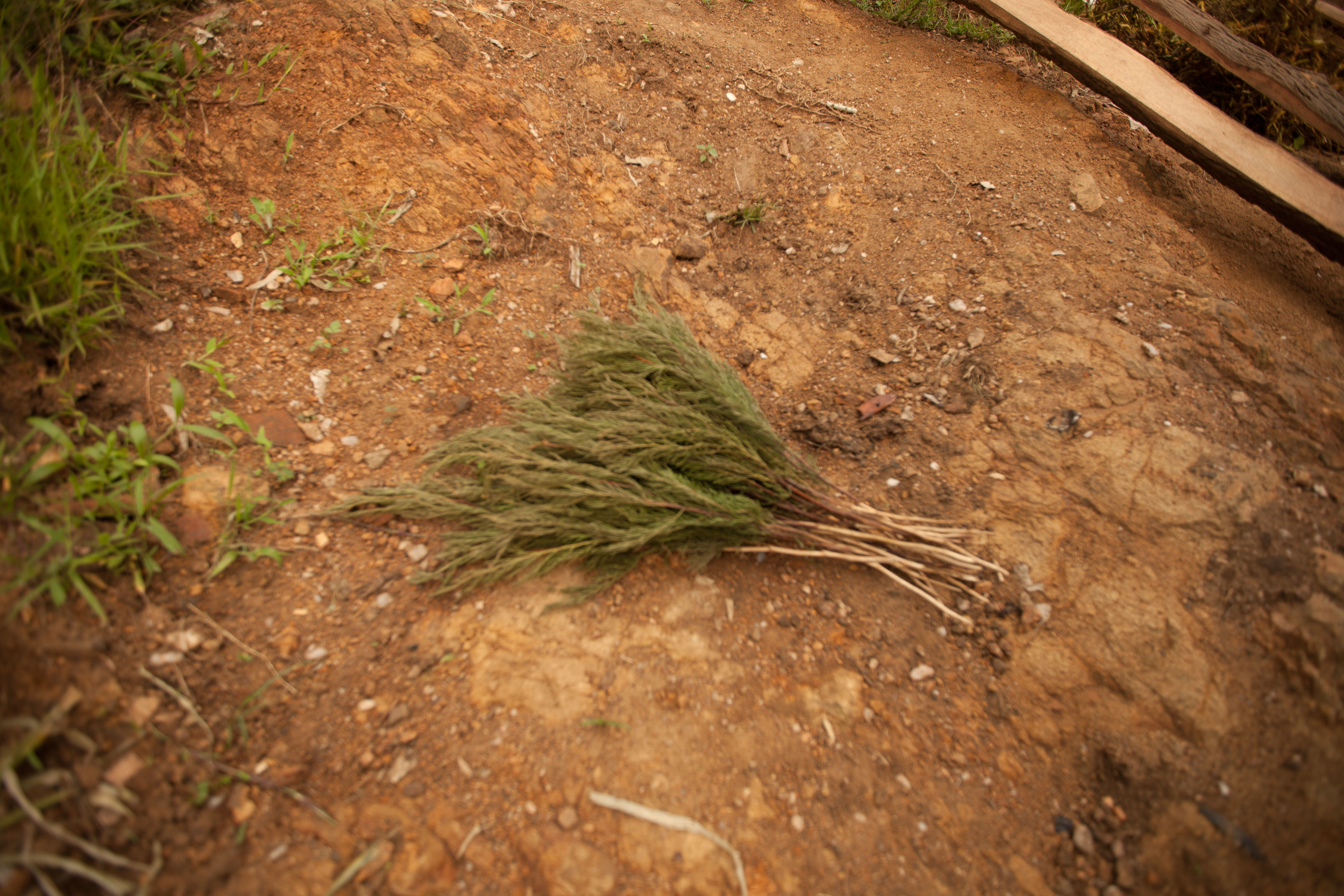
A broom at a Rwandan home, made out of twigs

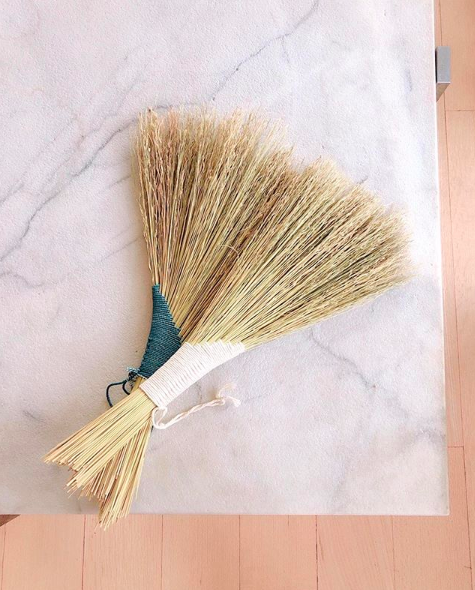
Two 'turkey tail' style brooms made from broom corn

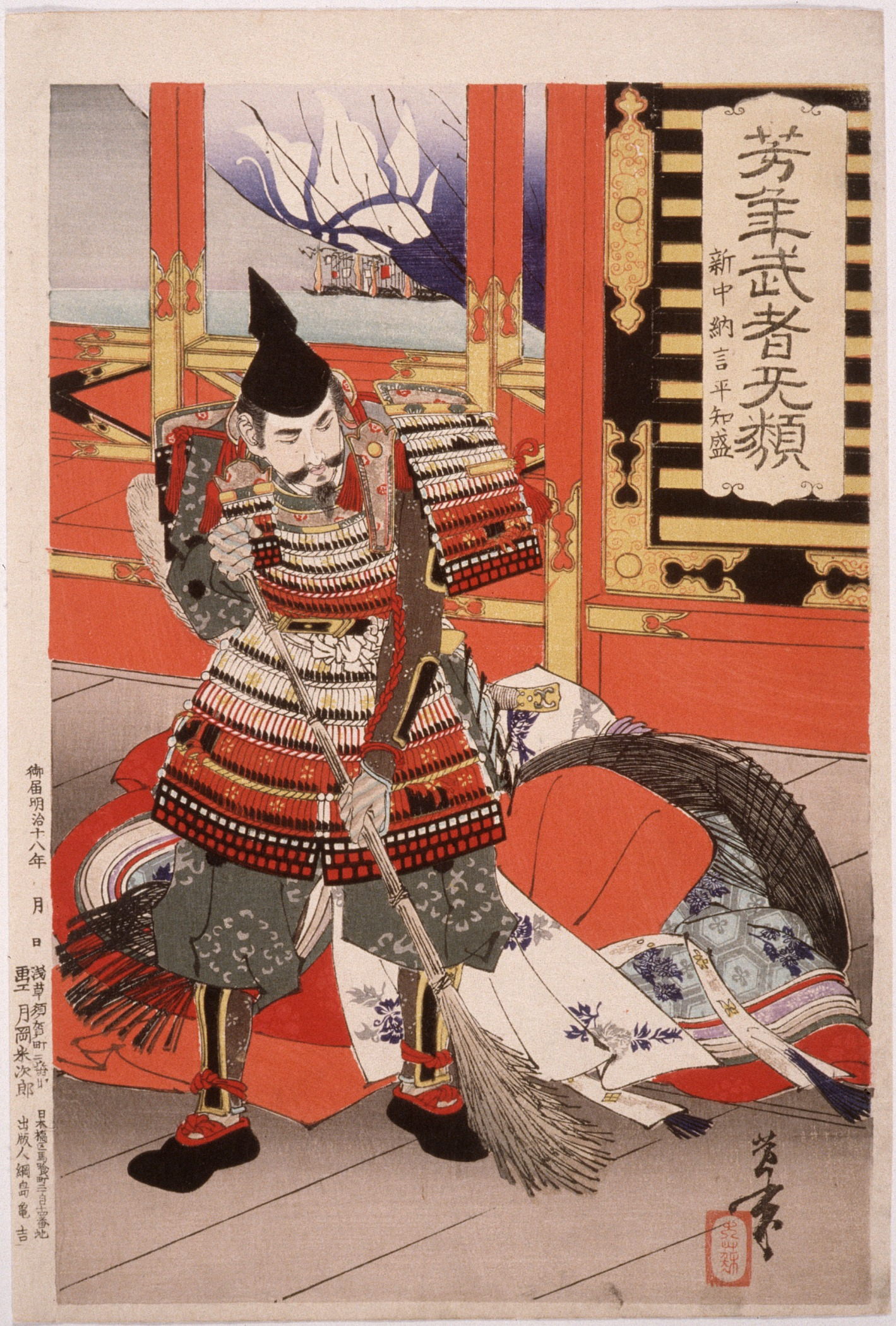
Japanese warrior sweeping the deck with a broom before killing himself

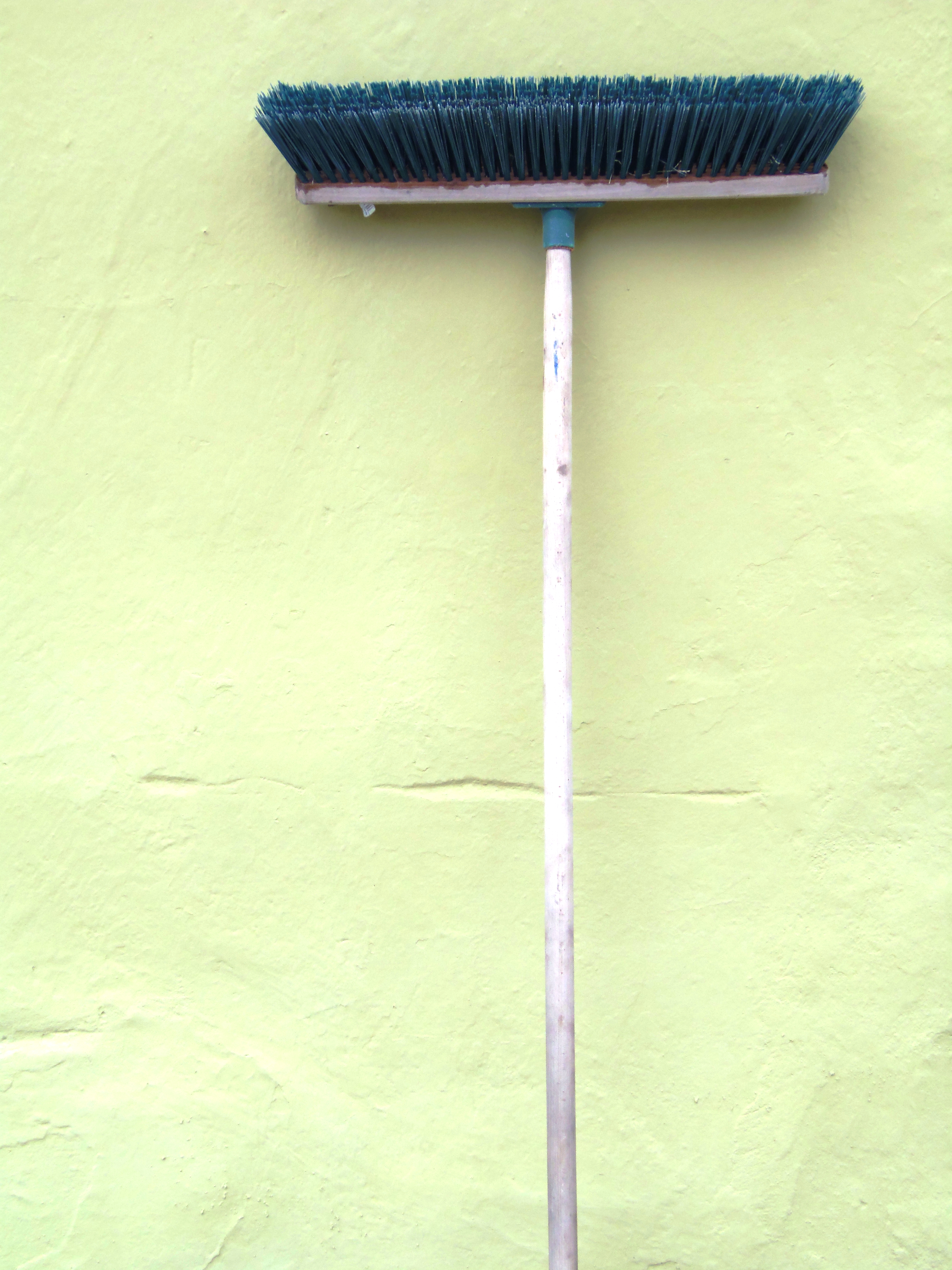
Floor broom

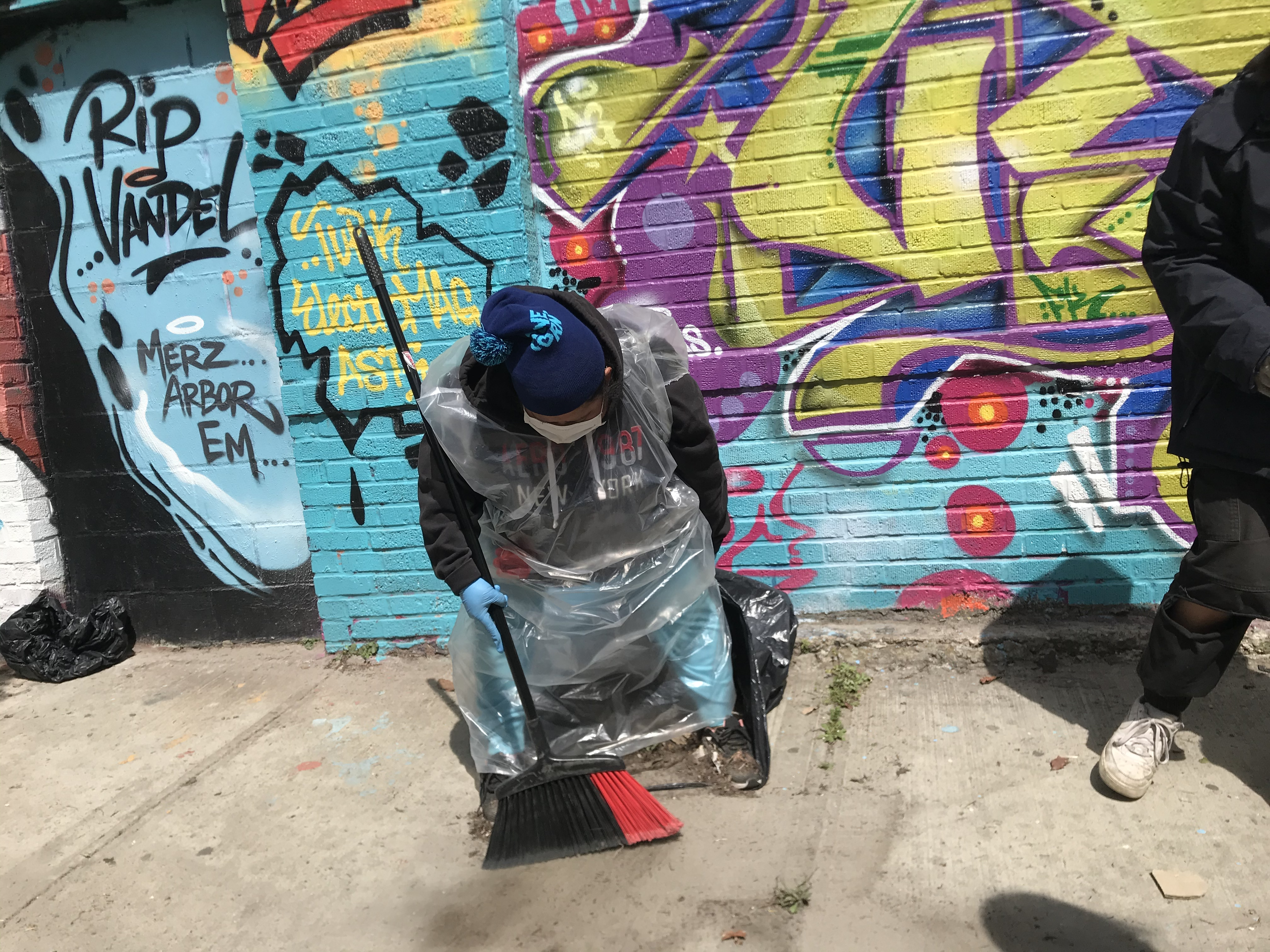
Street clean volunteer uses a broom, Earth Day 2021

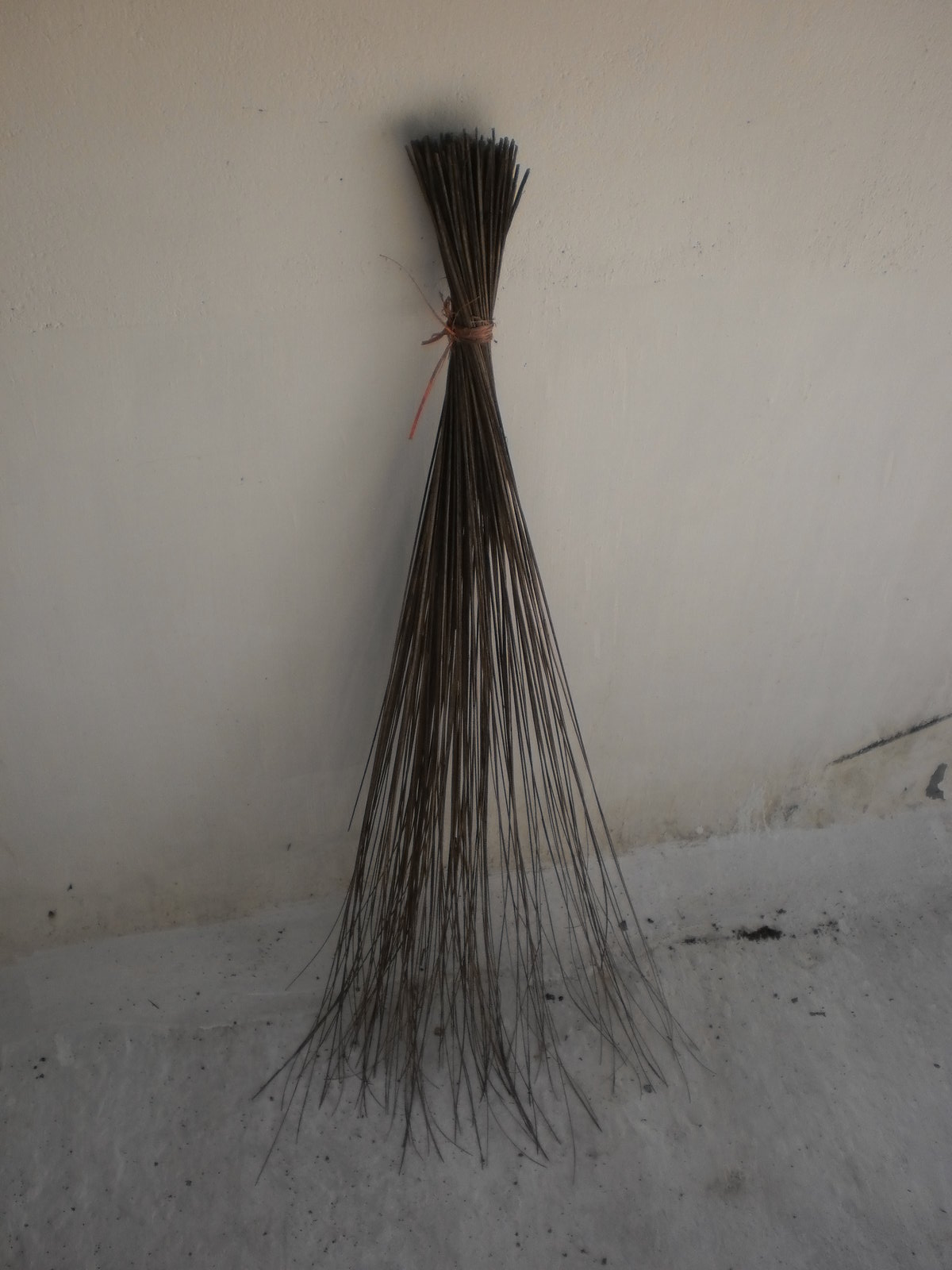
Broom made of the stem of coconut leaf

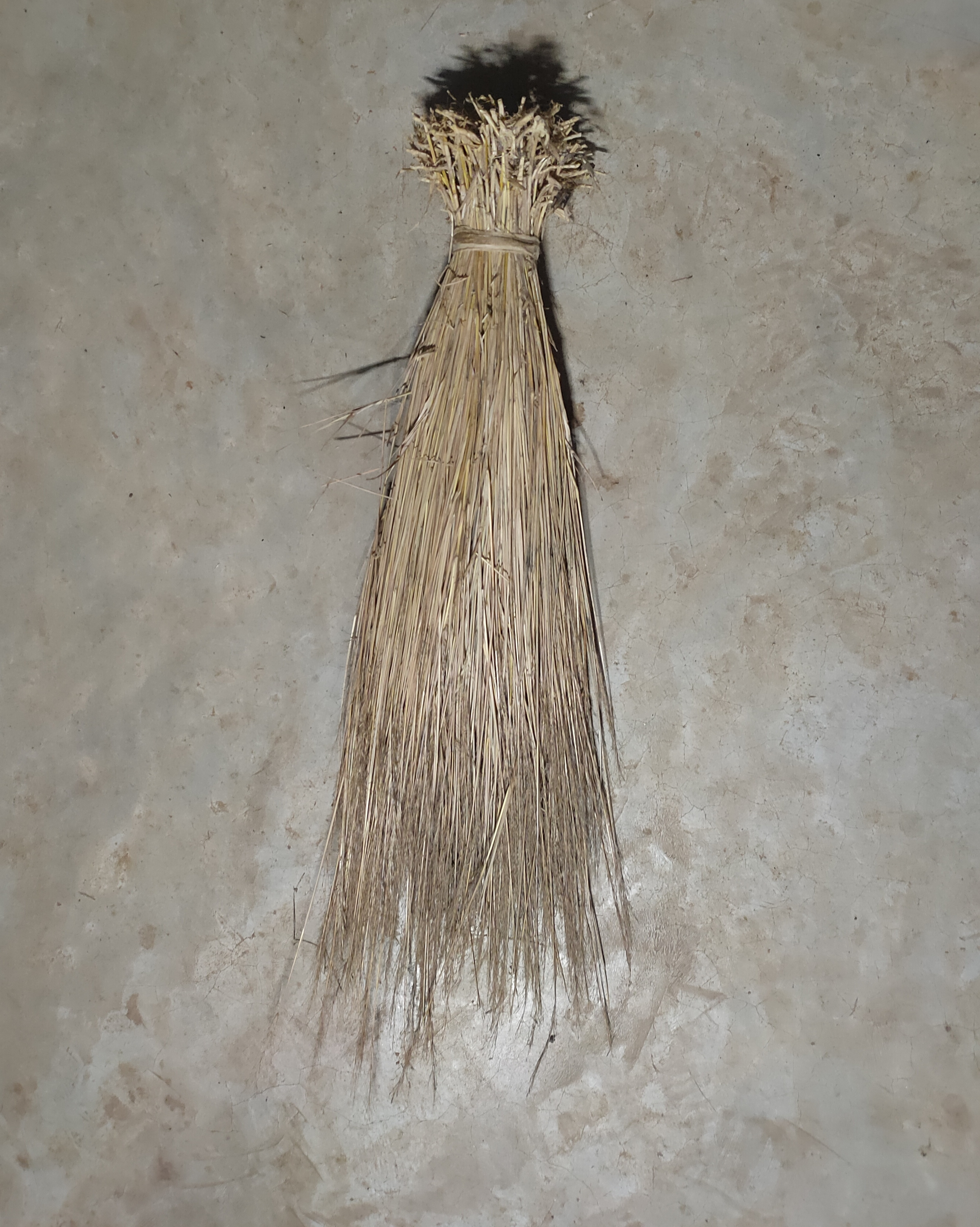
Indian soft broom made with local grass

== See also ==
- Bath broom
- Besom
- Mop
- Squeegee
