= Lower Caldecote =

Hamlet in Bedfordshire, England

Coordinates: 52.09986°N 0.27637°W

- Location within Bedfordshire
- OS grid reference: TL181460
- Civil parish: Northill
- Unitary authority: Central Bedfordshire
- Ceremonial county: Bedfordshire
- Region: East
- Country: England
- Sovereign state: United Kingdom
- Post town: BIGGLESWADE
- Postcode district: SG18
- Dialling code: 01767
- Police: Bedfordshire
- Fire: Bedfordshire
- Ambulance: East of England
- UK Parliament: North Bedfordshire

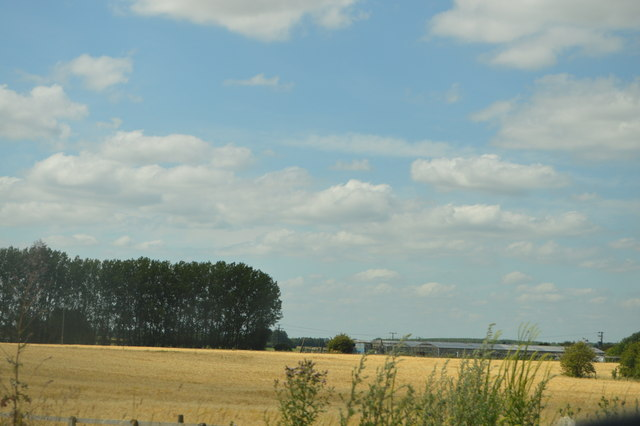
Farmland in Lower Caldecote

Lower Caldecote is a hamlet in the civil parish of Northill and part of the Central Bedfordshire district of Bedfordshire, England. The county town of Bedford is 7.5 miles (12 km) to the west.

== History ==
In spring 1989 at Warren Villas Quarry, pits, ditches and wooden structural timbers were uncovered. Dendrochronological (tree ringing) analysis dated a sequence of pits containing hurdles to the late Saxo-Norman period. Excavations between 1990 and 1994, revealed riverside activity and settlement dating from the prehistoric to post-medieval period.

Lower Caldecote is first recorded in 1351. The name Caldecote means "cold cottages" and refers to their exposed position on the flat countryside.

The Kings Head public house was in business from 1812 until 1985 but has since been demolished.

== Geography ==
Lower Caldecote is 1.5 miles (2 km) north northwest of Biggleswade, 2 miles (3 km) south of Sandy, 18 miles (29 km) south-west of Cambridge and 42 miles (68 km) north of Central London.

Except for Manor Farm, Lower Caldecote lies to the west of the A1 road. The River Ivel forms most of the settlement's eastern boundary, but a section extends across the river to a brook.

Lower Caldecote lies within the Bedfordshire and Cambridgeshire Claylands (NCA 88) as designated by Natural England. Central Bedfordshire Council has locally classified the landscape as Lower Ivel Clay Valley. Flat, open arable fields predominate to the west of the A1 road. Alongside the Ivel around Manor Farm, sand and gravel quarrying from the mid 1980s onwards has left a number of lakes.

The hamlet is 27 metres (89 ft) above sea level and the surrounding land is flat.

Lower Caldecote stands on first and second terrace river gravel while alluvium is by the Ivel. The soil is of low fertility, freely draining and slightly acid with a loamy texture.

Lynton Cottages (built 1902) and York House (1904) directly front the A1 northbound carriageway but the remainder of the hamlet was bypassed in 1960/61. Housing on The Grange was developed in the mid to late 1990s.

Light pollution is the level of radiance (night lights) shining up into the night sky. The Campaign to Protect Rural England (CPRE) divides the level of night sky brightness into 9 bands with band 1 being the darkest i.e. with the lowest level of light pollution and band 9 the brightest and most polluted. Lower Caldecote is in bands 4 and 5, affected by lighting along the A1 dual carriageway.

== Public transport ==
Stagecoach East runs service no.73 to Sandy and Bedford. Frequency is normally half-hourly but the interval may be 40 minutes or an hour in the early morning or evening. The journey time to Bedford bus station is 50 minutes. Buses stop outside Lynton Cottages on the A1 northbound, but the closest return stop is 1/4 mile south and necessitates crossing the busy A1 dual carriageway.

The nearest railway stations are Biggleswade and Sandy.

== See also ==
- Upper Caldecote
