= Hatch, Bedfordshire =

Hamlet in Bedfordshire, England

Coordinates: 52.1161°N 0.31105°W

Hatch
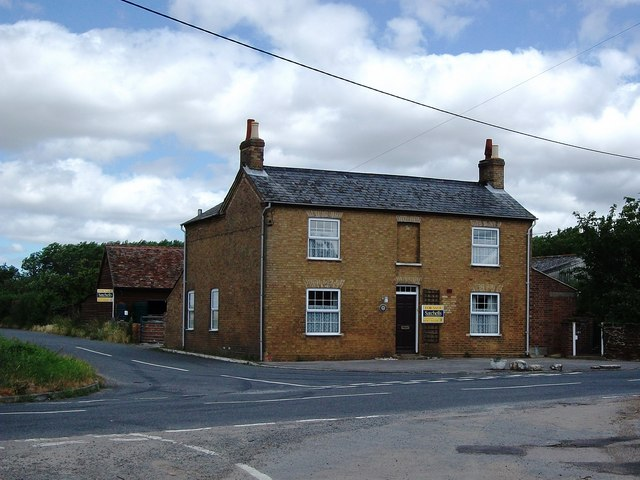
- Crossroads at Hatch

- Location within Bedfordshire
- OS grid reference: TL157477
- Civil parish: Northill
- Unitary authority: Central Bedfordshire
- Ceremonial county: Bedfordshire
- Region: East
- Country: England
- Sovereign state: United Kingdom
- Post town: SANDY
- Postcode district: SG19
- Dialling code: 01767
- Police: Bedfordshire
- Fire: Bedfordshire
- Ambulance: East of England
- UK Parliament: North Bedfordshire

Hatch is a hamlet in the Central Bedfordshire district of Bedfordshire, England.

It is located a little over a mile south-west of the market town of Sandy, and forms part of the Northill civil parish. Budna and Thorncote Green are located just to the west.

Hatch is not recorded in the Domesday Book. The settlement's earliest known record is in 1232 under the name "la Hache".
