= Christopher Layton =

American politician

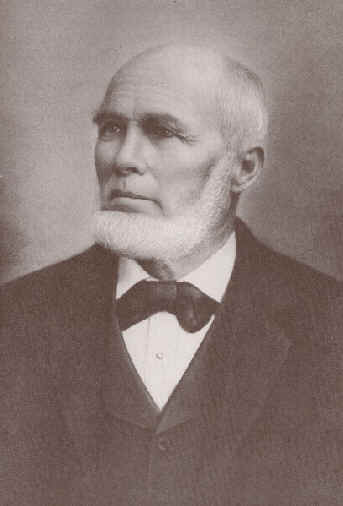

Personal details
- Born: March 8, 1821; Thorncote Green, Northill, Bedfordshire, England
- Died: August 7, 1898 (aged 77); Kaysville, Utah, United States
- Resting place: Kaysville City Cemetery; 41.045°N 111.926°W
- Spouse(s): 10 wives
- Children: 65 children
- Signature

Christopher Layton (March 8, 1821 – August 7, 1898) was a Mormon colonizer and Patriarch who founded the cities of Kaysville, Utah; Layton, Utah; and Thatcher, Arizona. Layton, Utah, is named after him.

== Life ==
Layton was born at Thorncote Green, Northill, Bedfordshire, England. He joined The Church of Jesus Christ of Latter-day Saints in 1842 and a year later emigrated to the United States.

In 1846, Layton joined the Mormon Battalion. In 1852, he moved to Kaysville, Utah Territory. (This is mistaken he along with 500 men were recruited for the battle for their country against Mexico. It was called the Mormon Battalion. President Polk upon the design of hurriedly taking California, and of using the migrating Mormons for that purpose.)

In 1866-1867 Layton was a member of the Utah Territorial legislature.

From 1883 to 1898, he served as president of the St. Joseph Stake of the Church of Jesus Christ of Latter-day Saints in Thatcher, Arizona.

Christopher Layton reveals himself as a common man who achieved great success as a business man, a Church man and particularly as a family man, being a father of sixty-five children and a husband to ten wives. An Englishman by birth, his first practical experience was at the age of seven when he kept crows off the wheat fields for one shilling and sixpence a week, the equivalent of 36 cents a week in the British money of the day.

=== Thorncut ===
In 1841, when he was twenty years of age, Latter-day Saint missionaries came to Thorncut. Christopher Layton heard and believed their message and was baptized on January 1, 1842. The following year he was married to Mary Matthews, and in 1843 the two set sail for America with 212 Saints on the ship Swanton led by Elder Lorenzo Snow. They arrived in Nauvoo in April, 1843, and established a home. At Nauvoo they met the Prophet Joseph Smith who shook Brother Layton's hand. He said, "God bless you," so fervently that the words "sank deep into our hearts giving us a feeling of peace such as we never had before." From here on to his final days, the life of Christopher Layton was full of dedication to the Church, loyalty to its leaders, activity in the settlement of the western Zion, and service to his fellow church men.

At the English hamlet of Big Mound, eight miles from Nauvoo, Christopher Layton was putting in seed corn when he heard the news of the death of Joseph, and he dropped his load and walked slowly out of the field. Two years later Mary Matthews Layton died, leaving her husband with a thirteen-month-old daughter.

=== Western travels ===
A friendly family took the child to rear, and, in 1846, Christopher Layton departed for the West with the exiled Saints. Arriving at the Missouri River, he enlisted in the Mormon Battalion with Company C, and made the long journey on foot to California. He was only a private in the Mormon Battalion, but his military service spread over nearly a quarter of a century. In 1868 he was commissioned a lieutenant colonel.

After his discharge at Los Angeles, in July, 1847, he made his way to the gold fields. There he forsook mining for the buying and selling of horses. Layton worked as a ranch foreman. He bought a band of horses at $1.50 a head and sold each one for $100. He made considerable money and decided to sail to England to visit his parents. After a long, stormy voyage he reached his homeland, only to find that his mother had died two weeks before his arrival. With this small fortune he brought a new bride, six relatives, and 250 friends to America. He engaged passage for all of them. While in England he married Sarah Martin. After a delay of more than a year in St. Louis, he led a large company of Saints across the plains and mountains to the Salt Lake Valley. For the next 30 years Christopher Layton pioneered in Carson Valley, Nevada, where he built for himself a large herd of cattle.

=== Kaysville ===
When it was known that the government was sending an army to Utah, the outlying settlements were abandoned, and Christopher Layton was called to Utah to the headquarters of the Church. He settled himself in Davis County and established Kaysville. Here he pioneered dry land farming and introduced alfalfa in what proved to be an epoch-making experiment. He also owned a farm on Antelope Island. He was general superintendent for the Utah Central Railroad. He served a term in the territorial legislature (1866–67). In 1876 he was elected a director of Zion's Co-operative Mercantile Institution (ZCMI), Salt Lake City.

In Kaysville he became a man of wealth and affluence and considered himself settled for life when the call came from the First Presidency to take charge of the settlements in southern Arizona. Christopher Layton had been set apart to preside over a new stake to be named St. Joseph in honor of the martyred Prophet. He was sent south to colonize a desert whose occasional Mexican and white villages were isolated by Apaches and desolation. Leaving six wives behind in Utah, Layton moved south with his youngest wife, Elizabeth, and with $21,000 set to work building an empire in southeastern Arizona. He bought two thousand acres, called the place Thatcher, divided it into lots, and sold them to Mormon settlers. He bought a gristmill, built roads, canals, homes. By 1898 he was 76, ill, and close to death. On June 13, 1898, he left for Utah.
