= Budna =

Hamlet in Bedfordshire, England

Coordinates: 52.11652°N 0.32513°W

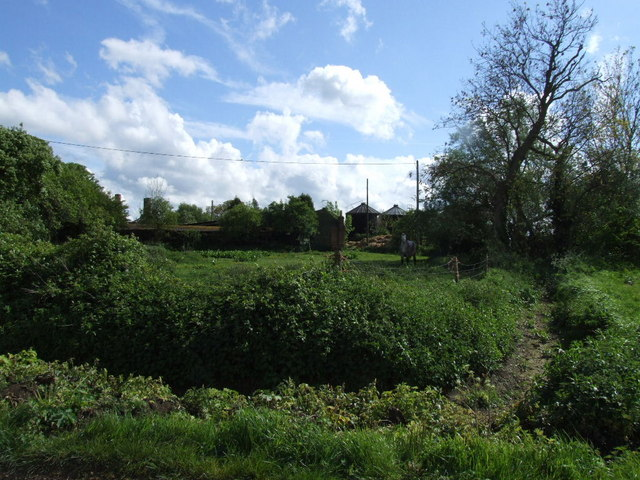
- Farm at Budna

- Location within Bedfordshire
- OS grid reference: TL147477
- Civil parish: Northill
- Unitary authority: Central Bedfordshire
- Ceremonial county: Bedfordshire
- Region: East
- Country: England
- Sovereign state: United Kingdom
- Post town: SANDY
- Postcode district: SG19
- Dialling code: 01767
- Police: Bedfordshire
- Fire: Bedfordshire
- Ambulance: East of England
- UK Parliament: North Bedfordshire

Budna is a hamlet in the civil parish of Northill, in Bedfordshire, England.

Budna is located to the north of the village of Northill, and near to Thorncote Green and Hatch. Budna lies on the border between Central Bedfordshire and the Borough of Bedford.

Variations of the name Budna have been recorded from the 12th century onwards with the name taken to mean "Budda's spur of land". The hamlet of Budna is mentioned under Northill parish in Volume 3 of A History of the County of Bedford, published in 1912 as part of the Victoria County History series. More recently, Budna has consisted of "little more than Budna Farm". Old Budna Farmhouse was Grade II listed in 1980 when in poor condition. The farmhouse dates from about 1600 and is timber-framed, with brick and part roughcast render under a thatched roof. A photograph shows the deteriorated state of the farmhouse in 2004.
