= Guillaume Edelin =

Confessed witch

Guillaume Edelin D.D., was a prior who confessed to being witch, convicted in 1453, and the first person to confess to have flown on a broom.

== Life ==
Edelin was the Prior of Saint-Germain-en-Laye, an Augustinian and a Doctor of Divinity. He promulgated the idea that it was impossible for the Devil to make pacts or witches to fly on brooms. He also confessed to having gone to the Sabbath "mounted on a balai", the first reference to the use of a broomstick in connection with witchcraft.

After his arrest he repented and was imprisoned for the rest of his life in the city of Évreux.
