= Thorncote Green =

Hamlet in Bedfordshire, England

Coordinates: 52.11536°N 0.32187°W

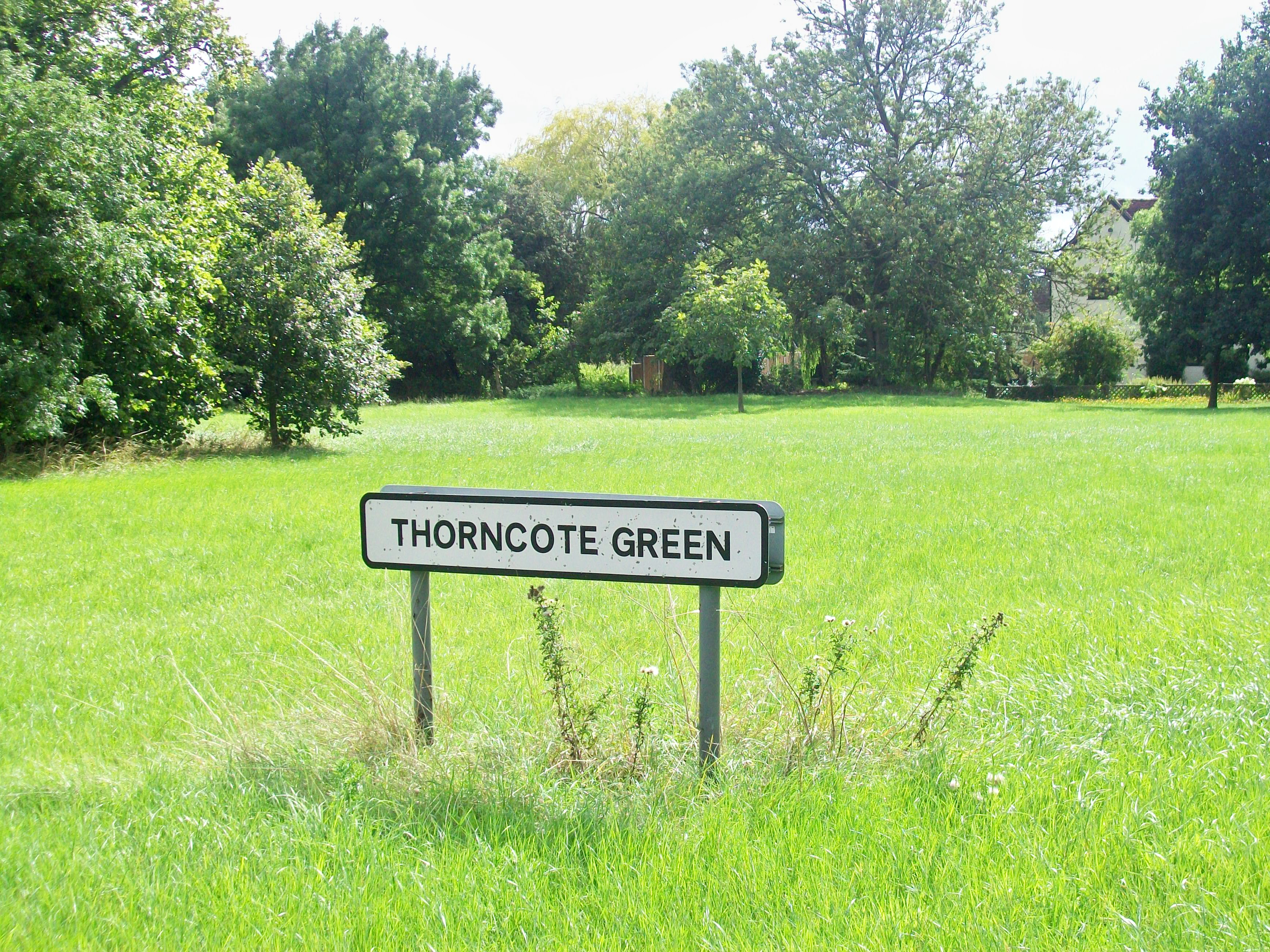

- Location within Bedfordshire
- OS grid reference: TL150476
- Civil parish: Northill
- Unitary authority: Central Bedfordshire
- Ceremonial county: Bedfordshire
- Region: East
- Country: England
- Sovereign state: United Kingdom
- Post town: SANDY
- Postcode district: SG19
- Dialling code: 01767
- Police: Bedfordshire
- Fire: Bedfordshire
- Ambulance: East of England
- UK Parliament: North Bedfordshire

Thorncote Green (often known only as Thorncote) is a hamlet located in the Central Bedfordshire district of Bedfordshire, England.

The settlement is located to the north of the village of Northill, and practically next to Budna. Thorncote Green lies near to the border between Central Bedfordshire and the Borough of Bedford.

== Commercial Activity ==
Although rural, Thorncote Green supports several small businesses:-

- London Electronics Ltd
- Franklins Farm, online butchers and farm shop
- Skysport Engineering Ltd

== The Manor of Thorncote ==
The Victoria County History equates this manor with a holding of Eudo the Steward, also known as Eudo, son of Hubert in the Domesday Book of 1086. That entry simply lists the manor under Beeston; the Domesday survey does not mention Thorncote, Hatch or Brook End in any of its entries. On Eudo's death the manor became property of the Crown and was attached to the Barony of Lindon [Lincoln].

By the 13th century the manor was held by Drew de Sutton and later by William Dru. In 1313 it was conveyed by John de Wresle to Walter de Huntingfold and Joan, his wife. At some time before 1377 Agnes, wife of Henry de Huntingfold was dispossessed by William de Brounsford who alienated the manor to Nicholas Westerdale and others who obtained a licence in 1386 to convey it to Warden Abbey in exchange for the abbey's granges at Ravensholt and Burdon in Cambridgeshire. The manor stayed in the hands of Warden Abbey until it was dissolved in 1537.

For more than a century, the Crown leased out the manor but in 1652, it granted the manor to John Eldred and others. This group were speculators who divided the land into four parts. In 1658, one of these parts was conveyed by Nathaniel Parcell to Jasper Edwards, Chief Registrar of the Court of Chancery. During the next hundred years the manor seems to have been reconstituted and appears in the ownership of Samuel Cockayne and Bromsall Throckmorton. By 1801 it was in the hands of Godfrey Thornton of Moggerhanger, who had purchased it from Thomas Smith of Grays Inn.

The manor remained in the hands of the Thornton family until a succession of Law of Property Acts in the 1920s abolished manorial fines and incidents as well as copyhold land tenure, thus abolishing manors in practically all but name.

Since April 2011, the title of Lord of the Manor of Thorncote has been held by Ian J. Wilkinson of nearby Peterborough, Cambridgeshire.

== Notable residents ==
- Christopher Layton, a Mormon colonizer and Patriarch, was born in Thorncote Green in 1821
