= Besom =

Type of broom

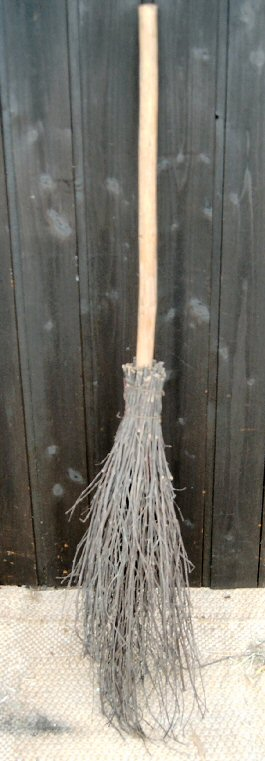
Classic form of the besom

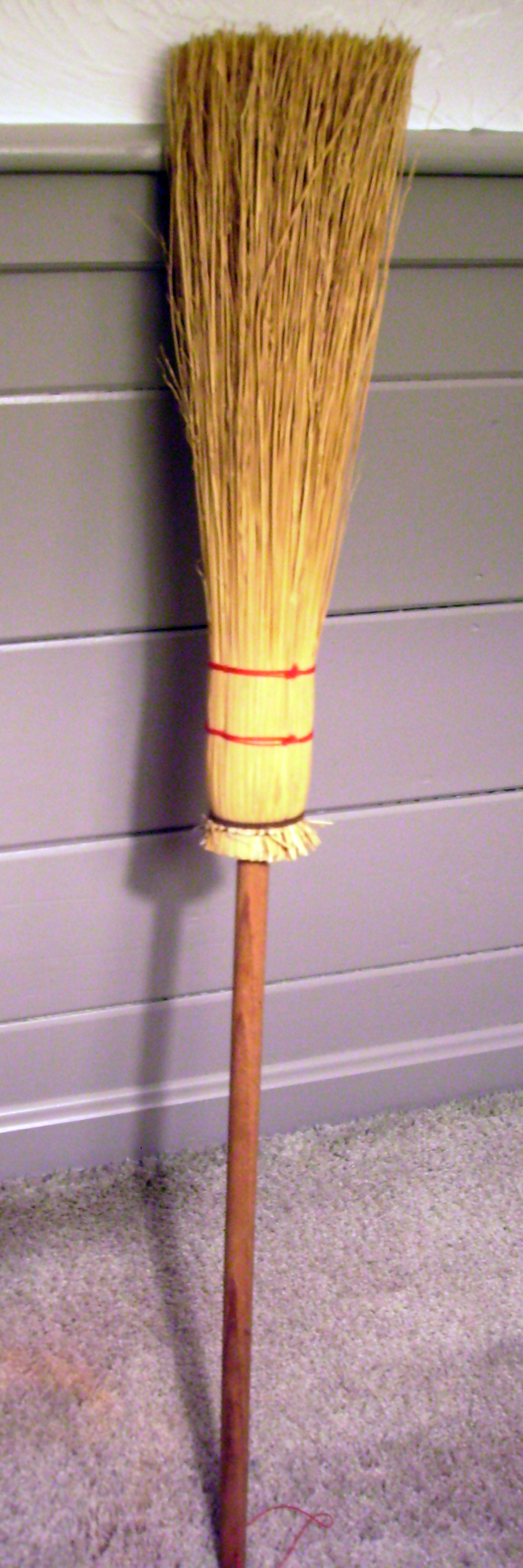
Alternative form of the besom, using fibres instead of twigs

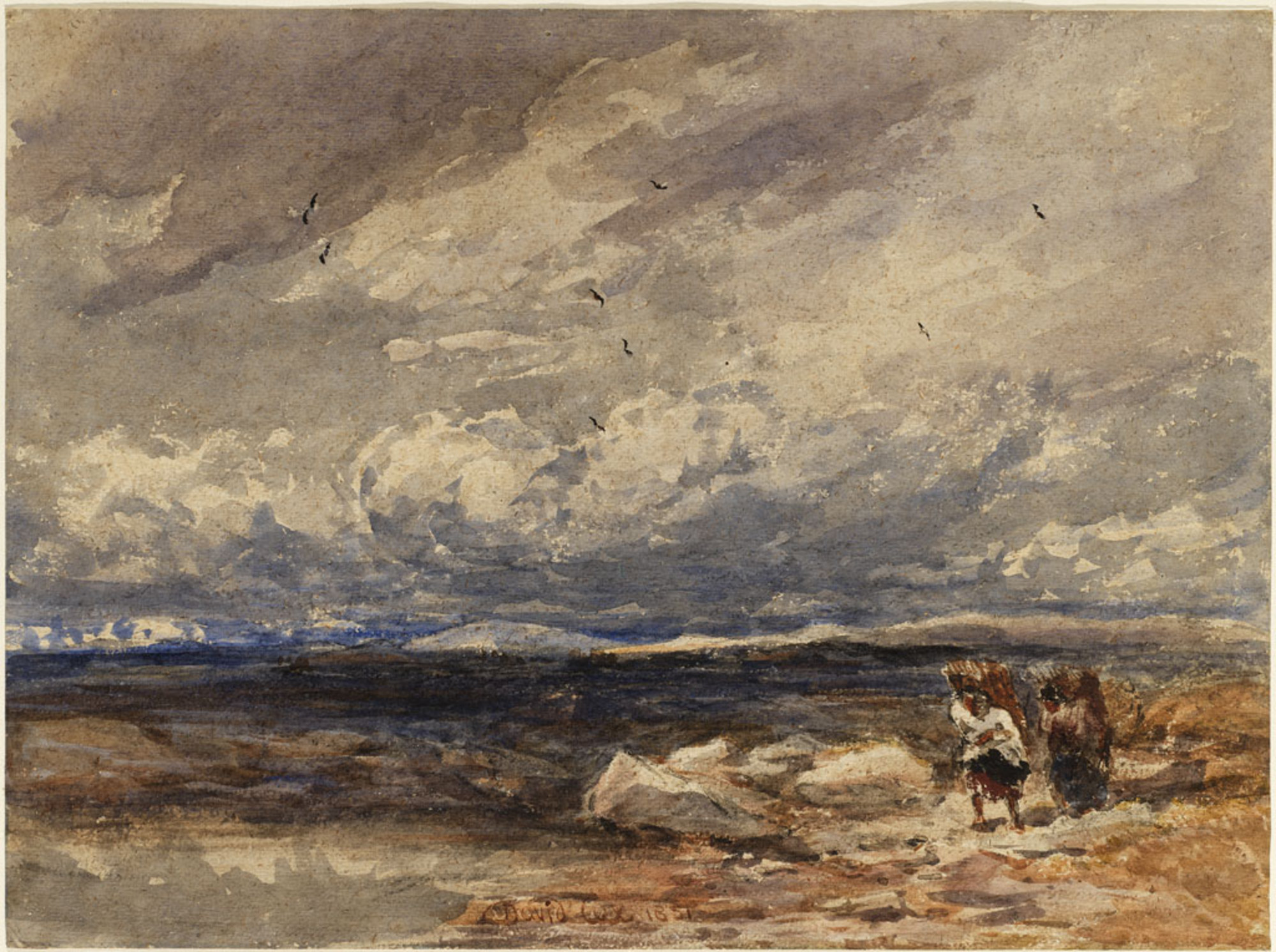
On Carrington Moss, 1851, David Cox, shows people gathering material for besoms.

A besom (/ˈbiːzəm/) is a broom, a household implement used for sweeping. The term is mostly reserved for a traditional broom constructed from a bundle of twigs tied to a stout pole. The twigs used can be of broom (i.e. Genista, from which comes the modern name "broom" for the tool), heather, or similar. The song "Buy Broom Buzzems" from Northern England refers to both types of twig. From the phrase broom besom the more common broom comes. In Scotland and Bulgaria, besoms are still occasionally to be found at the edge of forests, where they are stacked for use in early response to an outbreak of fire.

== Description ==
As a result of its construction around a central pole, the brush of the besom is rounded instead of flat. The bristles can be made of many materials including, but not limited to, straw, herbs, or twigs. Traditionally, the handle is of hazel wood and the head is of birch twigs. Modern construction uses bindings of wire and string (instead of the traditional split withy) and secures the head with a steel nail instead of a wooden dowel.

== Cultural associations ==
=== Besoms and flying ointments in early modern witchcraft ===
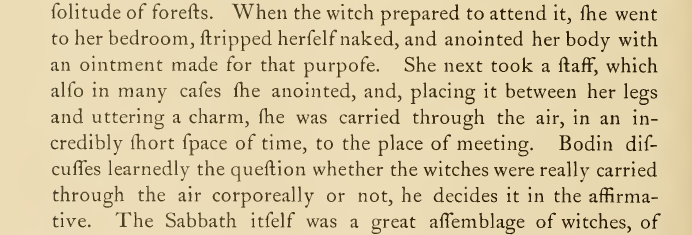
On the operation of a witch's broom, "Discourse on the worship of Priapus," pg 210, Richard Payne Knight Esq, on the conclusions of the "Malleus Maleficarum"

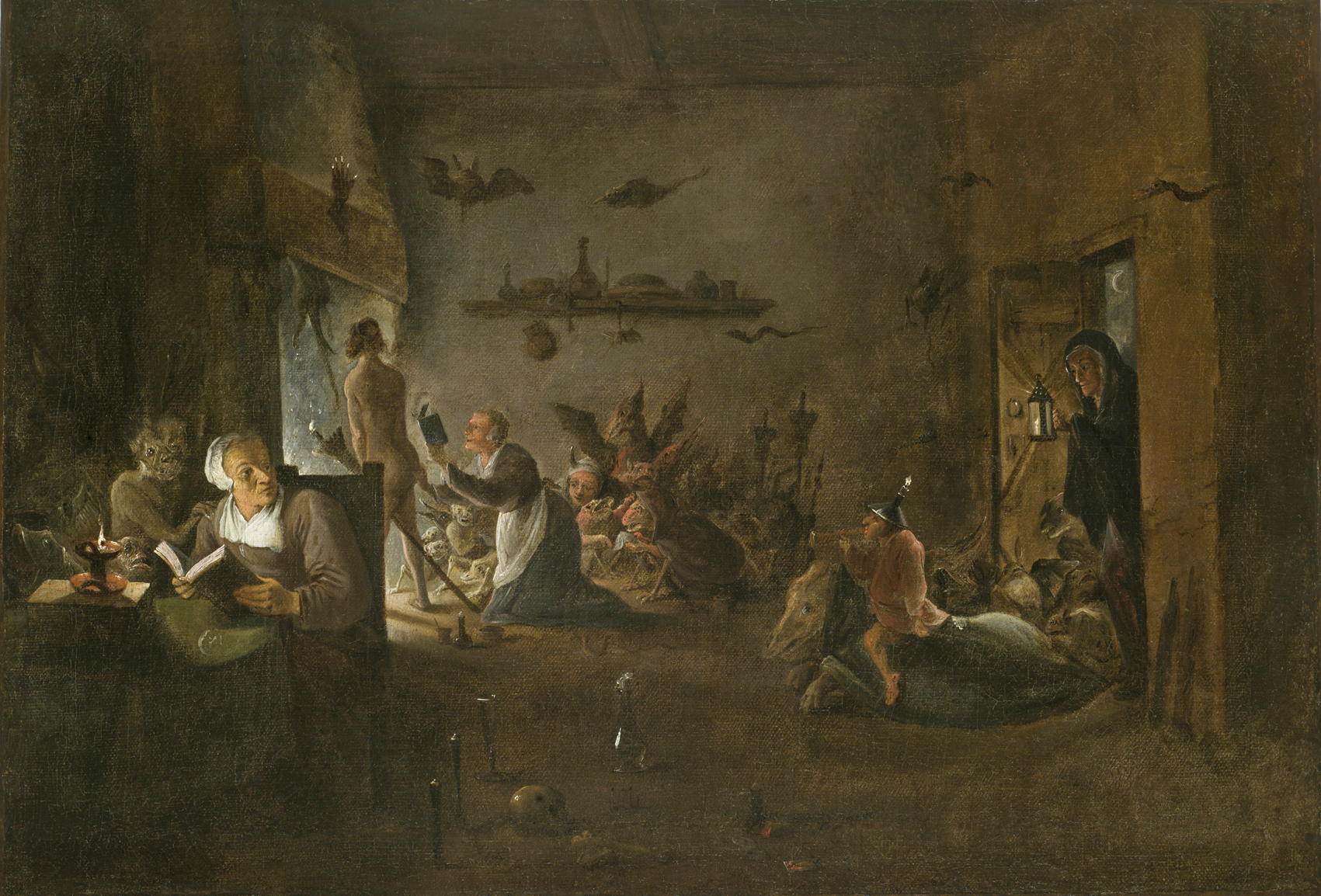
Preparation for the Witches' Sabbath by David Teniers the Younger. Note on the left an older witch reading from a grimoire while anointing the bottom of a young, naked witch, who is about to fly to the sabbath upon an inverted besom with a lit candle attached to its twigs. Note also stoppered vial, crock with lid and small pot with protruding spoon near back foot of young witch.

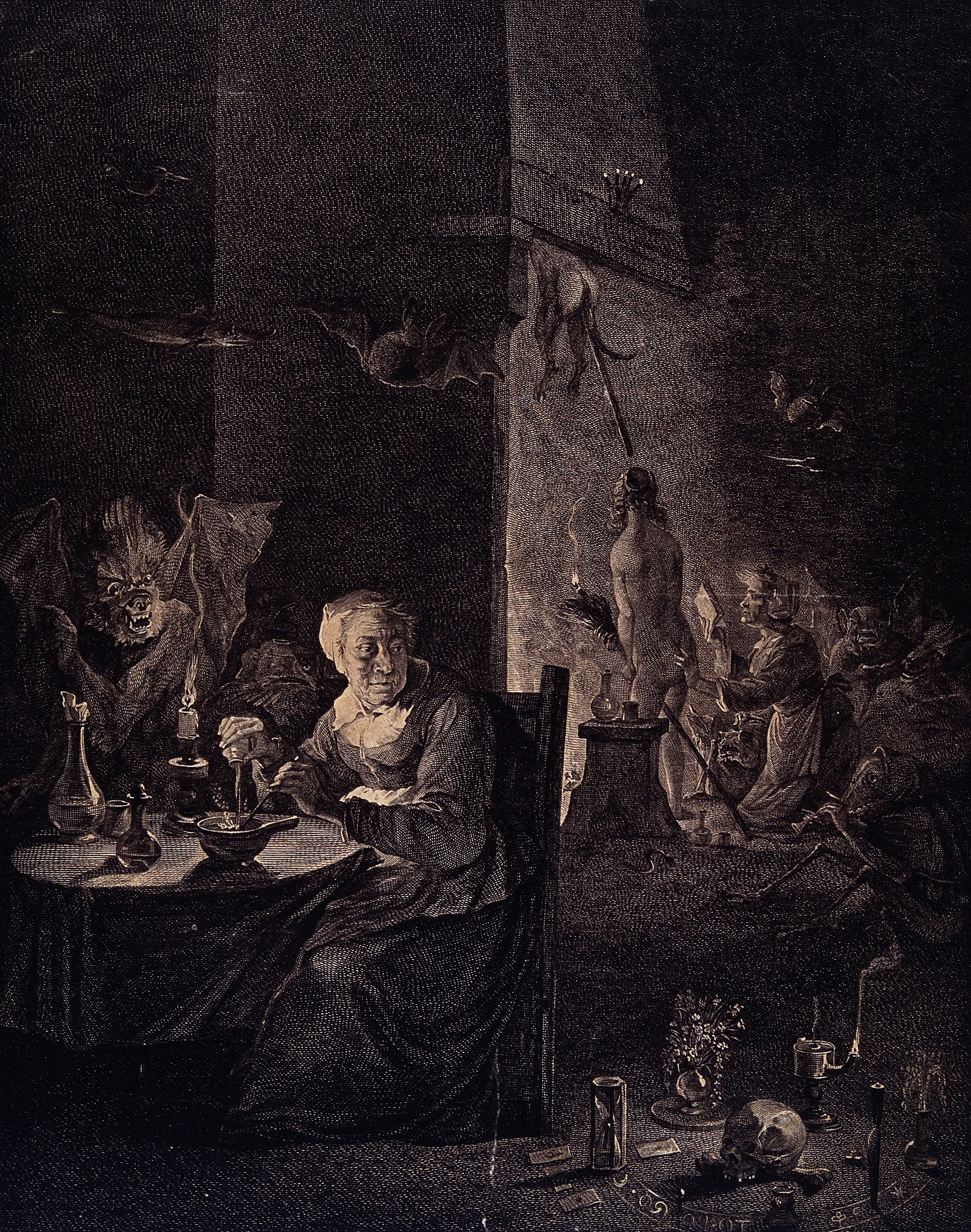
Preparation for the Witches' Sabbath Detail of engraving by J. Aliame based on Teniers the Younger painting above. Note (more clearly visible in this copy than in the original) that witch in front of young witch being anointed is not only flying upward, but has also shapeshifted into wolf (werewolf) or dog form.

A number of different recipes for "flying ointments" have survived from the early modern period, some of the constituents of which not only have hallucinogenic properties but are fat-soluble and could have been absorbed transdermally. Certain researchers have speculated that the stereotypical image of the witch "flying" astride the broomstick of a besom may derive from traditions concerning the use of broomsticks or other staves by women to apply psychotropic ointments to their vaginal or anal mucosa. The active ingredients in flying ointments were primarily plants in the nightshade family Solanaceae, most commonly Atropa belladonna (deadly nightshade) and Hyoscyamus niger (henbane), belonging to the tropane alkaloid-rich tribe Hyoscyameae. Other tropane-containing, nightshade ingredients included the famous mandrake (Mandragora officinarum), Scopolia carniolica and Datura stramonium, the thornapple. The alkaloids atropine, hyoscyamine and scopolamine present in these solanaceous plants are not only potent (and highly toxic) hallucinogens of the deliriant class, but are also fat-soluble and capable of being absorbed through unbroken human skin. Another ingredient listed frequently in the various flying ointment recipes is the even more toxic Aconitum napellus, which has (among others) the English common name wolfsbane (i.e. "slayer of wolves").

=== In Russia and Ukraine ===
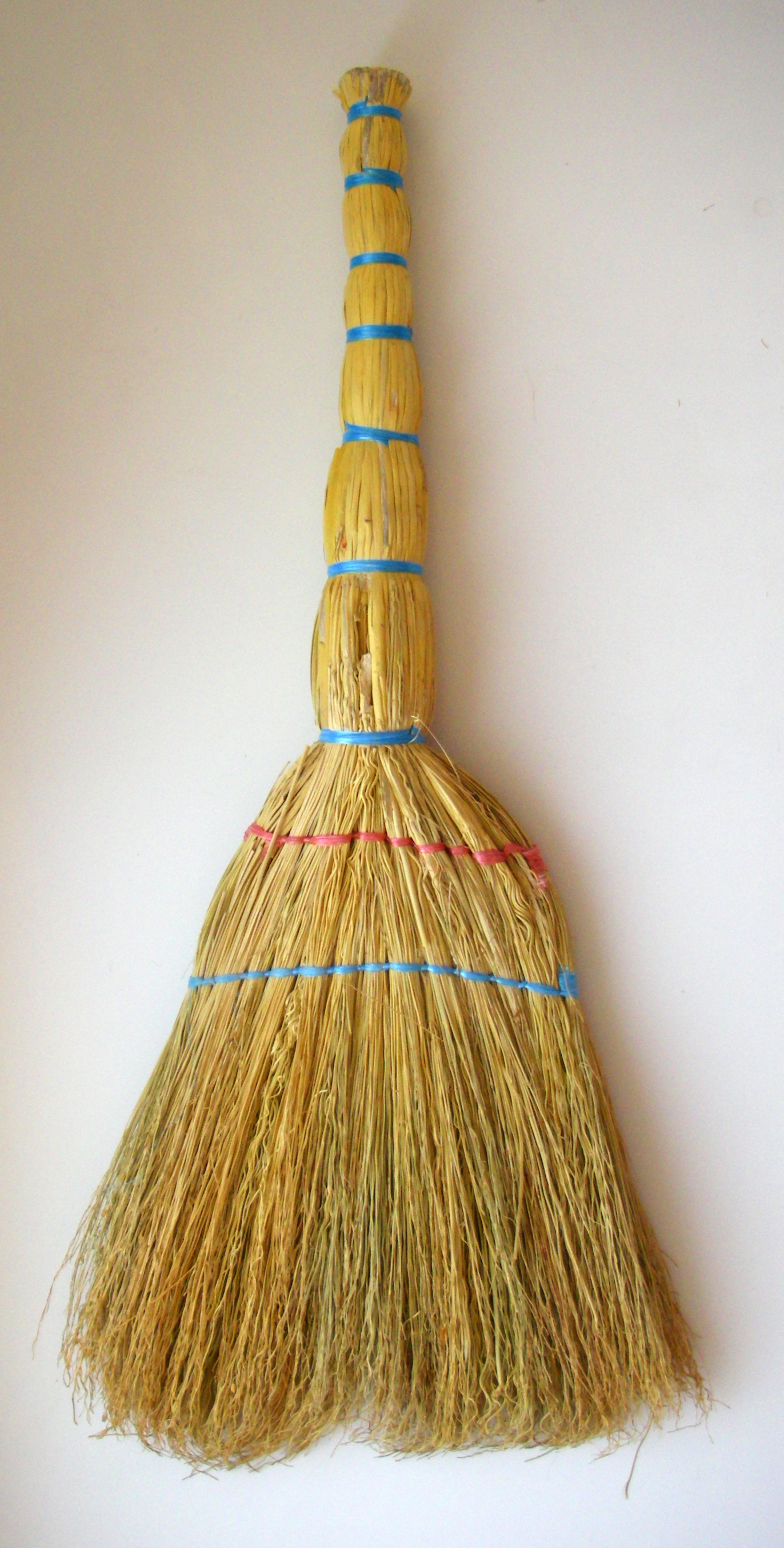
A Russian venik.

In Russian culture, the besom or venik (Russian: веник) has historically had both good and bad connotations. It was seen as a place behind or under which a domovoy would hide, and similarly to the broom it was sometimes associated with the occult. However, it also sometimes served as a protective amulet, as well as a tool for fortune-telling. A venik was also often not thrown away, instead being ceremonially burned during Maslenitsa. The venik's cultural significance extends outside Russia: in Odesa Oblast, Ukraine, a large venik statue (six metres tall) was erected to commemorate the 620th anniversary of the foundation of Savran, a settlement in the area, which was recognized as the largest venik monument in the world.

== See also ==
- Kumade rake
- Jumping the broom
