= Ickwell =

Village in Bedfordshire, England

Coordinates: 52.0963°N 0.3218°W

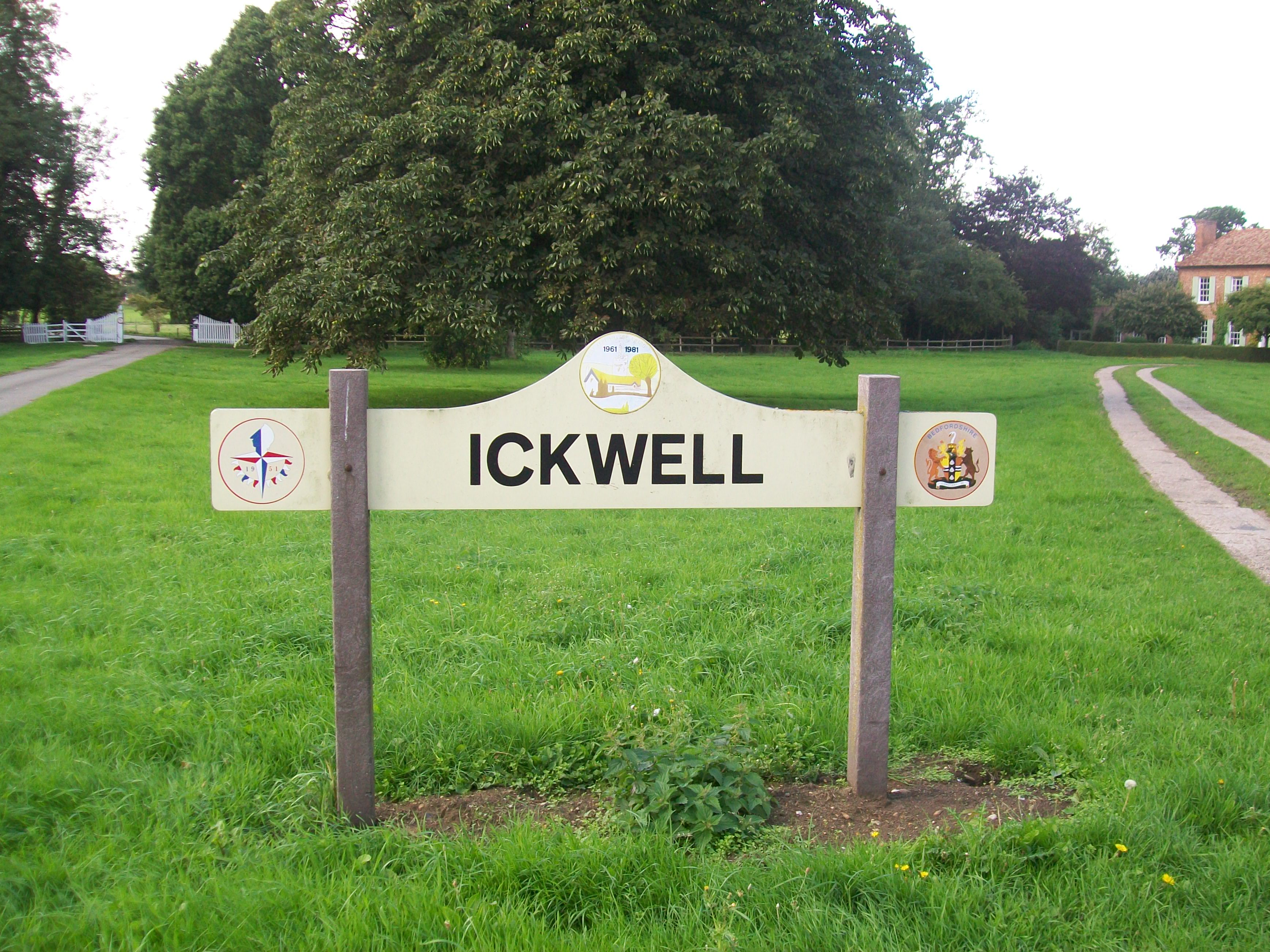
- Ickwell village sign

- Location within Bedfordshire
- OS grid reference: TL1545
- Civil parish: Northill
- Unitary authority: Central Bedfordshire
- Ceremonial county: Bedfordshire
- Region: East
- Country: England
- Sovereign state: United Kingdom
- Police: Bedfordshire
- Fire: Bedfordshire
- Ambulance: East of England

Ickwell is a small, rural village in the Central Bedfordshire district of the county of Bedfordshire, England about 6.5 miles (10 km) south-east of the county town of Bedford. Ickwell is part of the civil parish of Northill. The 2011 census shows its population as 298. The village is known for its maypole and for being the birthplace of Thomas Tompion, the "Father of English Clockmaking".

== History ==
Ickwell is not mentioned in Domesday Book of 1086. Its name is first documented in the thirteenth century, as 'Ikewelle'. Variations in the name's spelling (including Chikewelle, Geykewelle, Gigewel, Yekewell; Yikewell; Zekewekk and Zykwell) suggest that its origin is an Anglo-Saxon toponym meaning 'Gicca's spring'.

The manor of Ickwell (or Ickwell Bury) was part of the Barony of Eaton, with the other lands in Bedfordshire of Eudo, son of Hubert. Before 1284, it was given by William Hobcote to the prior of the Knights Hospitaller of St John of Jerusalem, who held it through the Dissolution of the Monasteries, relinquishing it in 1544. It was then granted by the Crown to John Barnardiston, whose heirs sold it in 1680 to John Harvey, who rebuilt the manor house in 1683 and whose family held it until the twentieth century.

== Ickwell Green ==
Cricket has been played on Ickwell Green for more than one hundred and twenty years, and Ickwell Green Cricket Club is one of the oldest such clubs in Bedfordshire.

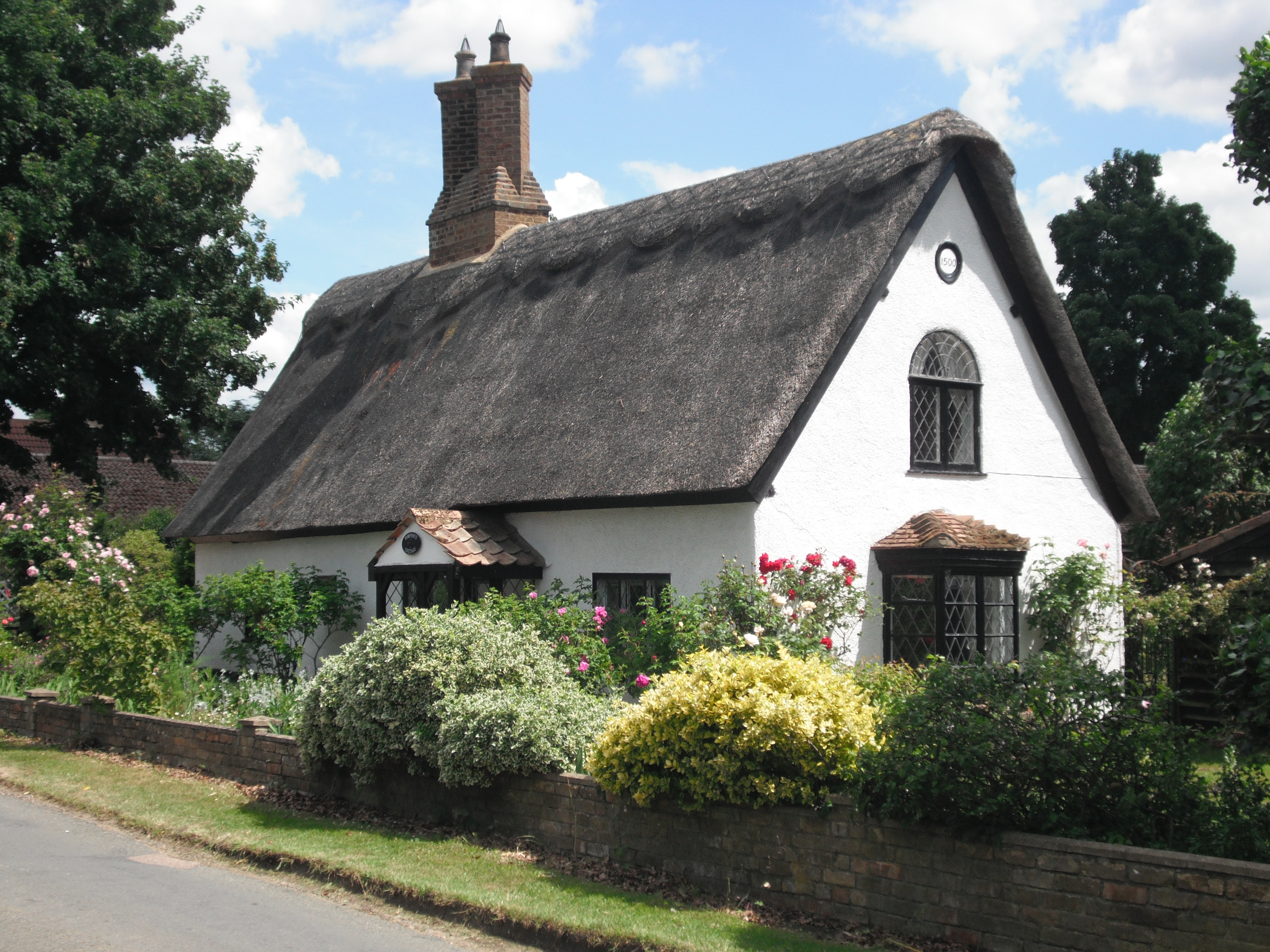
Tompion's Cottage

Ickwell is the birthplace of the English master clockmaker and watchmaker Thomas Tompion (c. 1639–1713), whose family cottage stands on Caldecote Road. Tompion was the son of a local blacksmith, another Thomas Tompion, and is believed to have worked at Ickwell as a blacksmith, but to have left by 1665 when his father died and the smithy was taken on by his younger brother, James.

All parts of the parish of Northill share a war memorial, which is at Ickwell Green and takes the form of a stone cross made of Portland stone bearing a bronze sword of sacrifice, designed by the architect Sir Reginald Blomfield.

=== Ickwell May Day ===
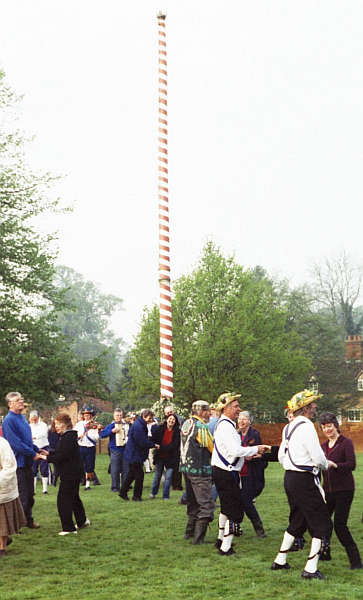
Villagers & Morris-men dancing beside the Maypole on Ickwell Green, soon after dawn on 1 May 2005

The Ickwell May Day festival, first documented in the churchwarden's accounts of c. 1565 but perhaps originating in the pre-Christian Beltane, takes place on Ickwell Green and celebrates the arrival of spring on May Morning, or 1 May. In the time of the Puritans, the festival ceased. A permanent maypole was first erected in 1872 by the local squire, John Harvey, to celebrate the birth of his son. There is Morris dancing by the Ickwell Mayers, the Old Scholars dance around the Maypole with their children and grandchildren, and with other games, contests, country dances, and music a May Queen is crowned.
