= River gravel =

Type of rock used for roads and landscaping

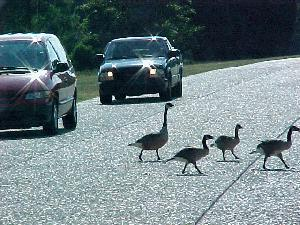
Migratory Canada geese cross the river gravel and concrete aggregate mix surface of the Colonial Parkway in eastern Virginia.

River gravel is a name given to gravel composed of small pieces of rounded stone of various colors, usually no larger than a large coin. It is named for the effect of many years of rounding of the edges of the stones due to a flow of water over it, as often takes place in a river. River gravel is often used in outdoor settings, such as a park walkway.

When a hard surface is also desired, river gravel is often set in a concrete aggregate mix. Owing to much higher cost than either asphalt or concrete pavement, the use of river gravel is generally limited to places where the appearance and/or its lack of sharp edges (when used alone) is of primary importance.

The American National Park Service's bucolic Colonial Parkway, linking the three points of Virginia's Historic Triangle, has a road surface of river gravel set in concrete aggregate. Built between 1930 and 1957, the Colonial Parkway is possibly the longest roadway open to the public which is surfaced of the material.

River gravel is also occasionally used for landscaping purposes and placed by landscape architects in non-traffic areas of high visibility. It may be used with many plants and shrubs because the rounded surfaces ensure rain and other water will soak through to reach the roots for necessary nurture.

== See also ==
- Gravel
- Pebble
- National Park Service Rustic
