= Dent Clock, St Pancras Station =

Large platform clock at St Pancras International, London

Coordinates: 51.53025°N 0.12522°W

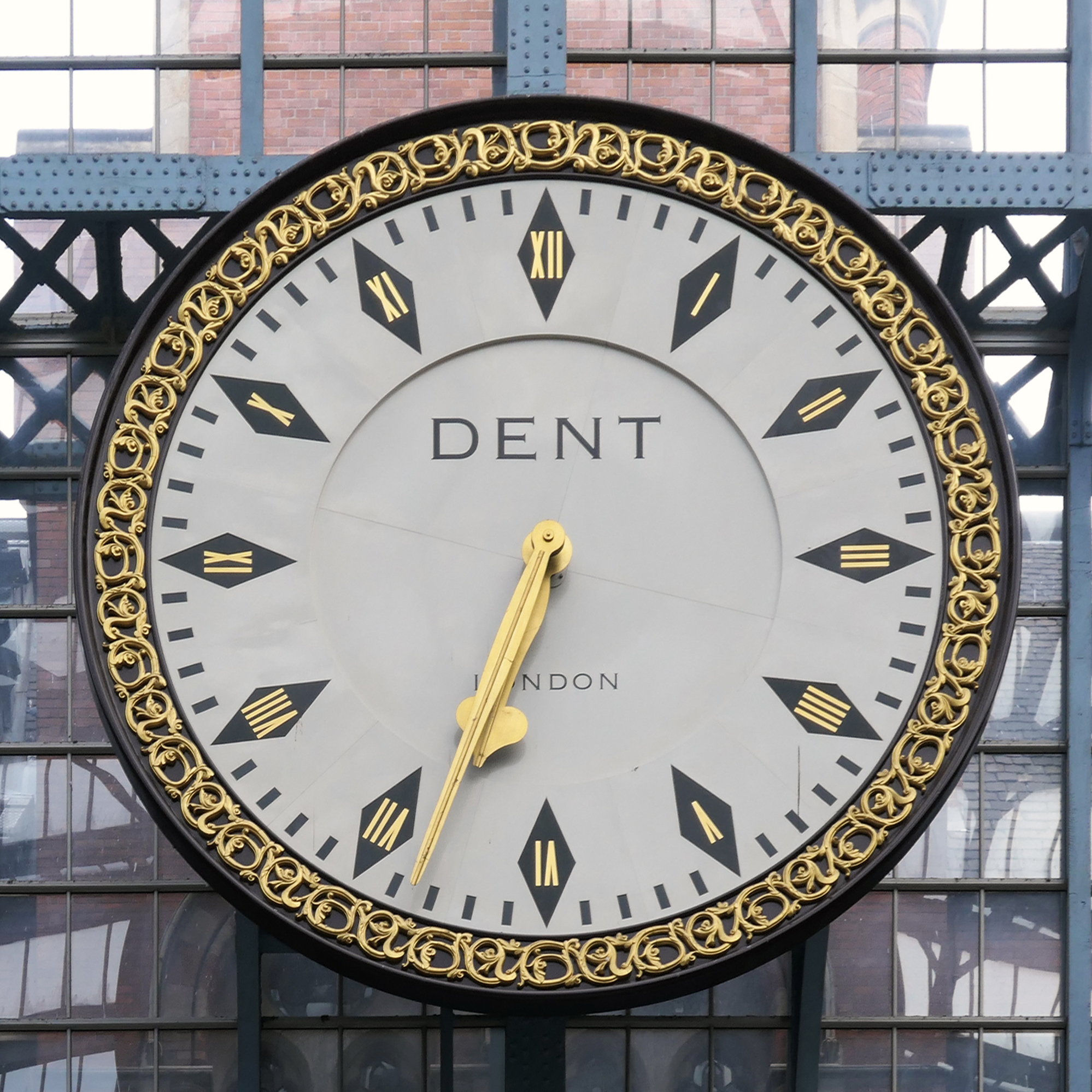
Dent clock, St Pancras station

The St Pancras station platform clock—often referred to as the Dent London clock—is the large dial clock mounted at the south end of the Barlow trainshed at St Pancras railway station (St Pancras International) in London. The present clock, installed in November 2007 as part of the station's restoration for High Speed 1, was made by Dent London, the makers of Big Ben, and has an 18 feet (5.5 m) dial with Welsh-slate hour markers and gilded numerals. It stands above Paul Day's 9-metre bronze sculpture The Meeting Place on the station's Grand Terrace.

== History ==
=== Victorian origin ===
When St Pancras opened on 1 October 1868 a “massive” slate-dial clock was set high at the south end of the trainshed. Contemporary sources recorded its diameter as 16 feet 9 inches (5.1 m)—then “the largest clock at any railway station in England”—with a 4 feet 5 inches (1.3 m) hour hand and a 7 feet 3 inches (2.2 m) minute hand. According to the station operator's historical account (citing Williams, 1877), all the station's clocks were constructed by John Walker of Cornhill, London; the platform clock's dial was of slate.

=== Removal, accident and Roland Hoggard ===
In 1968 the original dial was taken down during modernisation works and it was dropped and shattered when being removed. The incident entered railway lore after Midland guard Roland Hoggard purchased the fragments for £25, transported them to his farm in Thurgarton, Nottinghamshire, and painstakingly re-assembled a working clock on the side of his barn.

A frequently repeated claim states the clock had been sold to an American collector for £250,000 before the accident; this is reported in contemporary and later features, though HS1's own history notes that “no documentary evidence” for such a sale has been found.

British Rail subsequently installed a glass-reinforced plastic (GRP) replacement dial, upgraded in 1985, which served until the station's comprehensive restoration in the 2000s.

Hoggard's barn-mounted reconstruction later became an important reference: Dent London engineers and clockmakers took moulds from surviving parts and analysed the slate numerals to match the original source. Hoggard was invited to the royal ceremony that reopened St Pancras International in November 2007.

Accounts state that when Hoggard died in 2013, surviving parts of his reconstructed clock (including hands and mechanism) went to the British Horological Institute's Museum of Timekeeping at Upton Hall, Nottinghamshire. (The Museum's site provides general information about its collections and location at Upton Hall.)

=== 2007 reconstruction ===
As part of the £800 million transformation of St Pancras for High Speed 1, Dent London was commissioned to create a faithful new station clock, working with Smith of Derby. The current dial is 18 feet (5.5 m) across and uses metal plate with Welsh-slate “diamond” hour markers, gilded numerals and mouldings finished to match Victorian profiles. The movement is synchronised electric with GPS-controlled backup and automatic summer/winter time changeover.

The restored station, including the new clock, was officially opened by Queen Elizabeth II on 6 November 2007 and the Eurostar terminal opened to passengers later that month.

== Location and public art ==
The clock occupies its historic position at the south end of the trainshed, overlooking the Grand Terrace, directly above Paul Day's 9-metre bronze The Meeting Place, commissioned by London & Continental Railways and unveiled in November 2007. A statue of John Betjeman by Martin Jennings also stands on the upper level, commemorating the poet's role in saving the station.

== Cultural reception ==
The platform clock has long acted as a rendezvous point—revived in popular coverage during the 2007 reopening—while the new clock and the public art beneath it have attracted wide commentary.

== Notes ==
Primary and project pages used for technical detail include Dent London's case study and Smith of Derby's project note; dimensions, materials and movement specification are corroborated there. HS1's “A Tale of Three Clocks” supplies 19th-century dimensions and the attribution to John Walker of Cornhill, and cautions that the oft-repeated sale-price story lacks documentary evidence.
