= Edward Dent =

Edward Dent may refer to:

- Edward John Dent (1790–1853), clockmaker who designed Big Ben
- Edward Joseph Dent (1876–1957), professor of music
