= Paul Day (sculptor) =

British sculptor

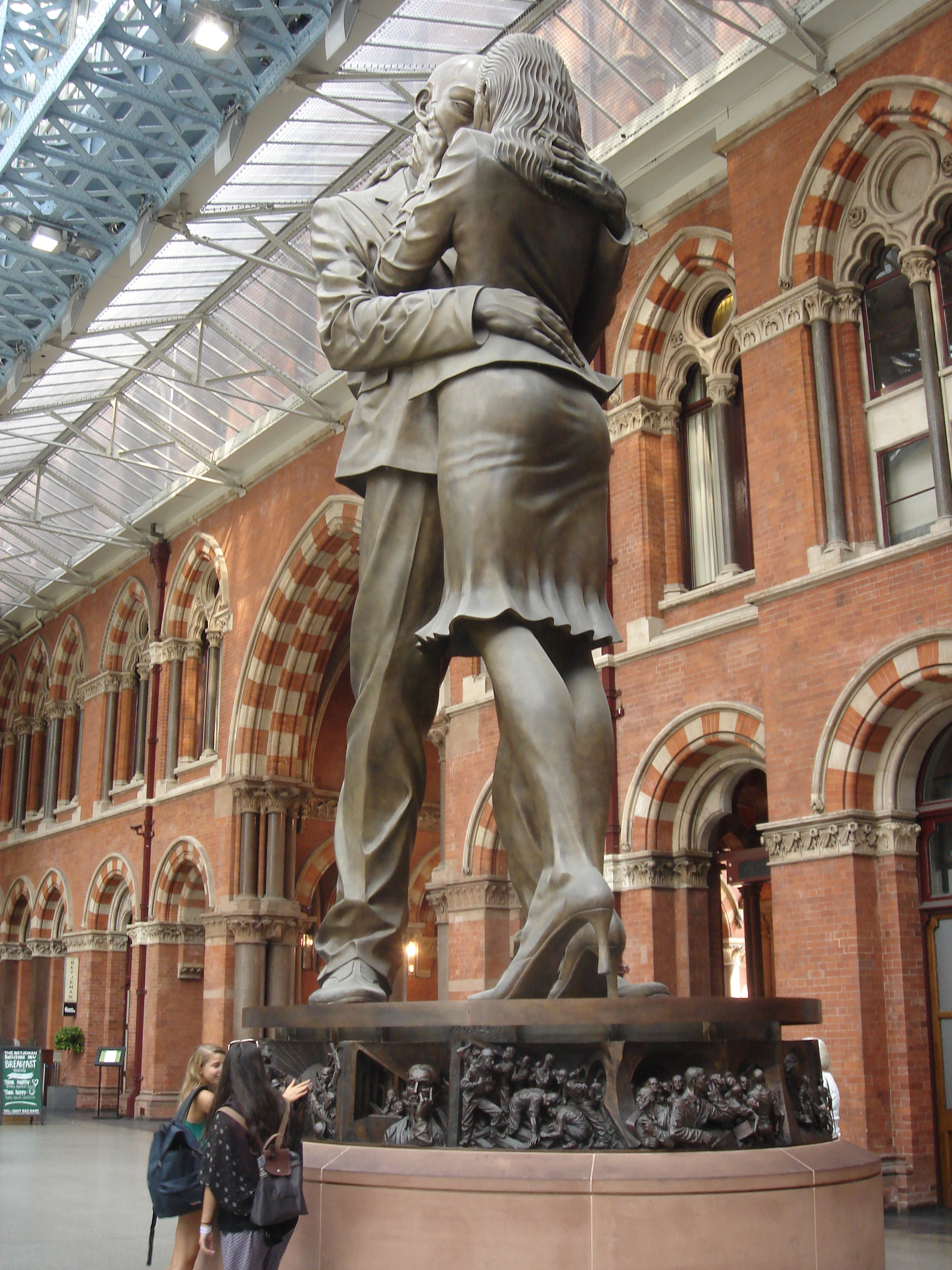
The Meeting Place, St Pancras Station, London, 2013

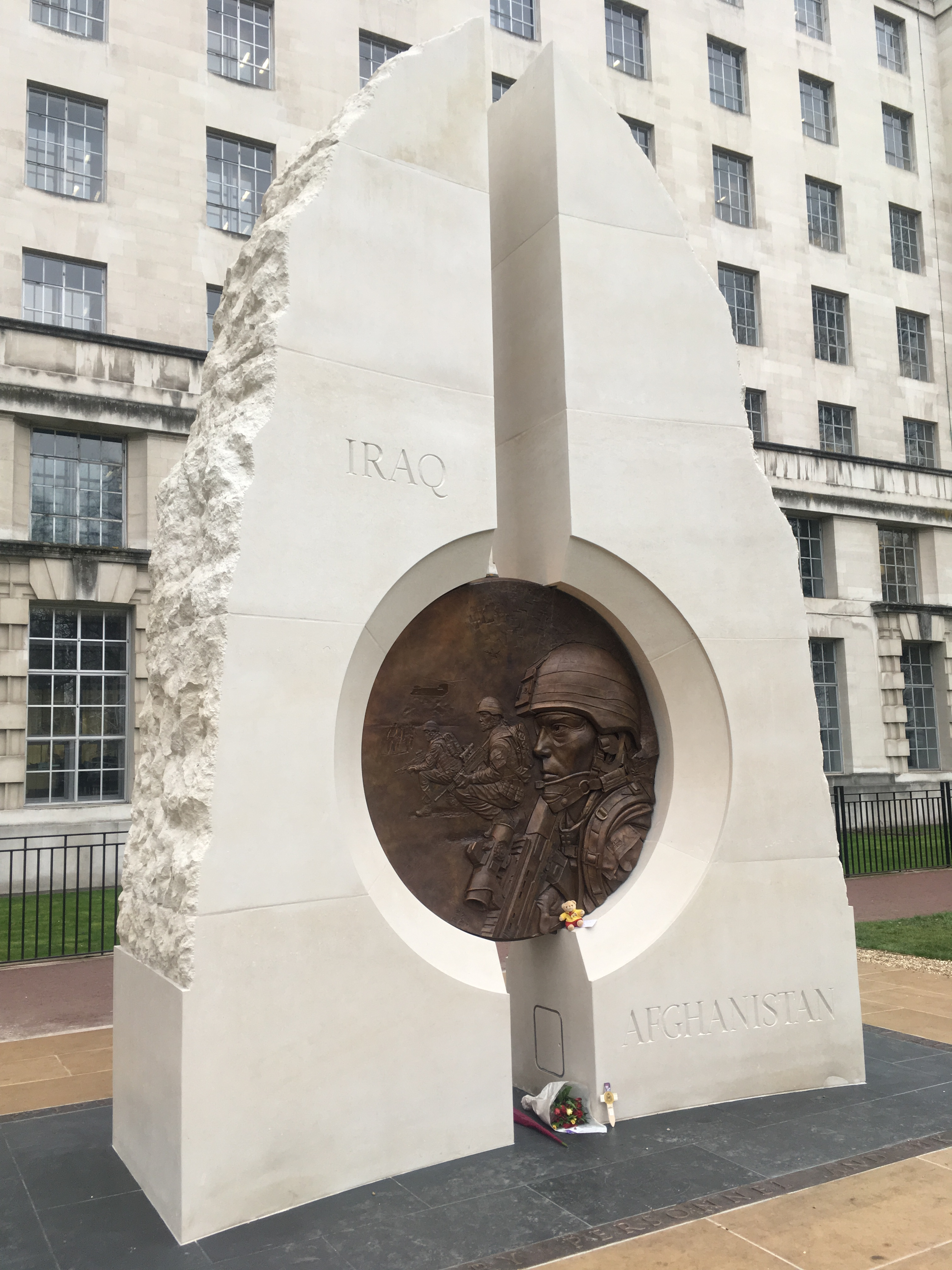
Iraq and Afghanistan Memorial, Victoria Embankment Gardens, London, 2017

Paul Day (born 1967) is a British sculptor. His high-relief sculptures in terracotta, resin, and bronze have been exhibited widely in Europe and his work is known for its unusual approach to perspective.

Major works include:

- Brussels — An Urban Comedy, a 25 m (82 ft) long terracotta frieze in the Royal Galleries of Saint-Hubert in Brussels
- The Battle of Britain Monument on the Victoria Embankment in London
- The Meeting Place, a 9 m (30 ft) tall bronze sculpture inside St Pancras railway station in London, surrounded by a frieze (see below).
- Iraq and Afghanistan Memorial (2017), in Victoria Embankment Gardens
- A Beautiful Day in the Neighborhood (2021), at Rollins College in Winter Park, Florida.

In 2008 a high-relief frieze was added to the base of The Meeting Place as part of refurbishments at St Pancras, featuring images from the history of the Tube and train: people queuing on platforms or travelling in carriages; soldiers departing for war and returning injured, and repair works following the 7 July 2005 London bombings. The work was the object of controversy when first erected, as one panel depicted a commuter falling into the path of a train driven by the Grim Reaper. However, following discussions with London and Continental Railways (LCR), this panel was replaced with another.

Day studied at art schools in the UK at Colchester and Dartington, and completed his training at Cheltenham in 1991. He now lives in a village near Dijon, France, with his French wife, Catherine. Their Anglo-French relationship is an explicit and repeated theme in his works.

The Meeting Place, which is modelled on an embrace between Paul and Catherine, stands as a metaphor for St Pancras's role as the terminus of the rail link between England and France. Another contemporary sculptor and critic, Antony Gormley, singled out The Meeting Place when he condemned the current public art works across the UK, stating: "there is an awful lot of crap out there". Day admitted that "Some will say it is a chocolate box sculpture."

In December 2017, Day received criticism for accepting a commission to create a sculpture in Moscow of the late Uzbek leader Islam Karimov, "widely regarded as one of the most ruthless dictators in recent history", and responded, "I go with the flow".

In 2021, A Beautiful Day in the Neighborhood, a memorial for Fred Rogers by Day was unveiled at Rollins College in Winter Park, Florida. In 2023, Day was announced as the sculptor for the upcoming The Forces’ Sweetheart And Wartime Entertainers’ Memorial planned for the National Memorial Arboretum in Staffordshire.
