= Dipleidoscope =

Instrument used to determine local true noon

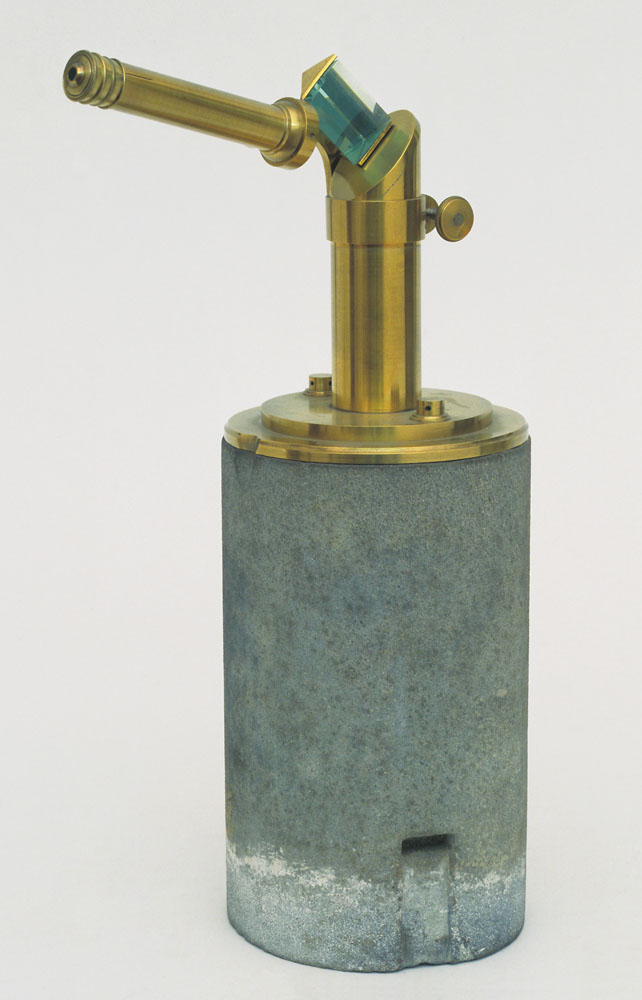
Dipleidoscope

A dipleidoscope is an instrument used to determine true noon; its name comes from the Greek for double image viewer. It consists of a small telescope and a prism that creates a double image of the sun. When the two images overlap, it is local true noon. The instrument is capable of determining true noon to within ten seconds.

The dipleidoscope was invented by Giovanni Battista Amici in the first half of the 19th century.

Edward John Dent, a chronometer and clockmaker in London, was working in the 1830s on a simple contrivance that would allow the public to set clocks correctly based on the transit of the sun (more complex and expensive transit telescopes had been developed by Ole Rømer in 1690). By 1840, he felt he had come to a suitable design using shadows, however when he communicated his ideas to J.M. Bloxam (a barrister), he found he had also been working on his own design using reflections, which Dent felt was superior. The two formed a partnership and worked together on the device, and after a further 2 years of work, they finalised the design and patented it (GB Patent 9793 of 1843), with Dent manufacturing and selling it as Dent's Dipleidoscope. The instrument could use the Moon as well as the sun and when correctly calibrated and aligned the accuracy was said to be less than a second. Dent exhibited the device at the Great Exhibition of 1851. After Edward Dent died in 1853, his son Frederick William Dent took over manufacture.

The significance of this device relates in part to the development of the railways, when an absolute knowledge of the time became more important, whereas previously it was often sufficient that an entire rural community would use the parish clock, and this would periodically be set by 'the announcement of the guard of the mail coach' or similar. The instrument came with a detailed instruction booklet, which had a substantial section on correcting local time to Greenwich Mean Time (as used by the railways).
