= St Pancras railway station =

Railway terminus in London, England

St Pancras
- London St Pancras International
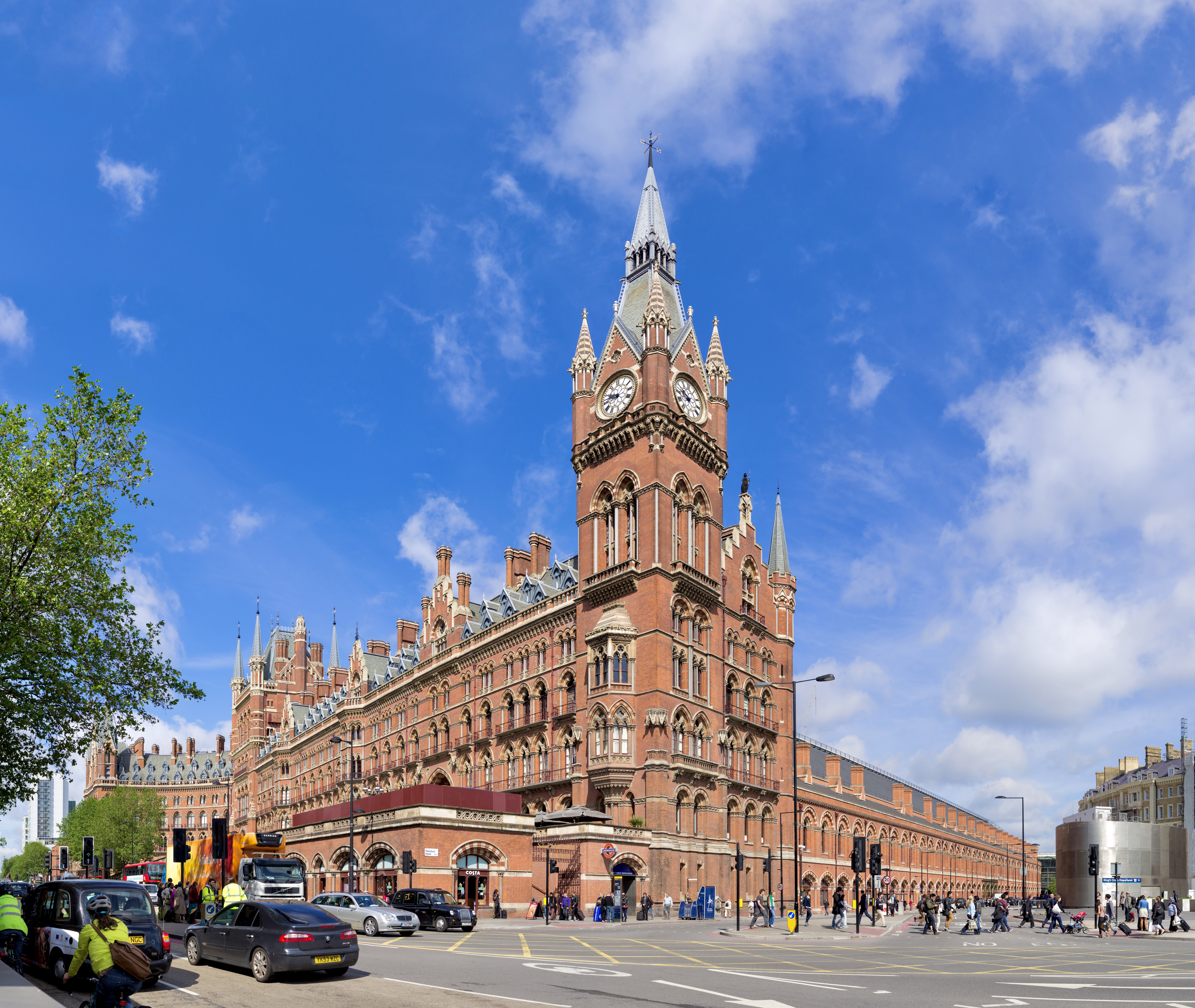
- View from Euston Road
- Interactive map of St Pancras

General information
- Location: St Pancras
- Local authority: London Borough of Camden
- Managed by: Network Rail (High Speed) for HS1 Ltd; Eurostar; Network Rail (Thameslink and Midland Main Line service platforms)
- Owner: HS1 Ltd
- Station codes: STP (domestic), SPX (international), 70154005 (SNCF)
- DfT category: A (mainline platforms); C1 (Thameslink platforms)
- Number of platforms: 15
- Accessible: Yes
- Fare zone: 1
- OSI: King's Cross St Pancras; London King's Cross; London Euston
- Cycle parking: Yes – external (in car park)
- Toilet facilities: Yes

National Rail annual entry and exit
- 2020–21: ▼6.363 million
- Interchange: ▼0.926 million
- 2021–22: ▲18.995 million
- Interchange: ▲2.878 million
- 2022–23: ▲33.296 million
- Interchange: ▲5.673 million
- 2023–24: ▲35.960 million
- Interchange: ▼2.566 million
- 2024–25: ▲38.843 million
- Interchange: ▲2.742 million

Railway companies
- Original company: Midland Railway
- Pre-grouping: Midland Railway
- Post-grouping: London Midland & Scottish Railway

Key dates
- 1 October 1868: Opened as terminus for Midland
- 15 July 2006: New domestic (Midland Main Line) platforms opened
- 6 November 2007: Relaunched by Elizabeth II. Renamed London St Pancras International
- 14 November 2007: Eurostar services transferred from London Waterloo International
- 9 December 2007: Low-level Thameslink platforms opened
- 13 December 2009: Southeastern high-speed domestic services introduced

Other information
- External links: (domestic) Departures; (domestic) Facilities
- Coordinates: 51°31′48″N 00°07′31″W

St Pancras International (/ˈpæŋkrəs/) is a major central London railway terminus on Euston Road in the London Borough of Camden. It is the terminus for Eurostar services between the United Kingdom and Belgium, France and the Netherlands. It provides East Midlands Railway services to Luton Airport Parkway, Luton, Corby, Leicester, Nottingham, Derby and Sheffield on the Midland Main Line (or MML), Southeastern high-speed trains to Kent via Ebbsfleet International and Ashford International, and Thameslink cross-London services to Bedford, Luton, Luton Airport Parkway, Cambridge, Peterborough, Horsham, Gatwick Airport and Brighton. It stands between the British Library, the Regent's Canal and London King's Cross railway station. Beneath both main line stations is King's Cross St Pancras tube station on the London Underground; combined, they form one of the country's largest and busiest transport hubs.

The station was constructed by the Midland Railway (MR), to connect its extensive rail network, across the Midlands and North of England, to a dedicated line into London. After rail traffic problems following the 1862 International Exhibition, the MR decided to build a connection from Bedford to London with its own terminus. The station was designed by William Henry Barlow, with wrought iron pillars supporting a single-span roof. At 689 feet (210 m) long by 240 feet (73 m) wide, and 100 feet (30 m) high, it was then the largest enclosed space in the world. Following the station's opening 1 October 1868, the MR built the Midland Grand Hotel on the station's façade. George Gilbert Scott won the competition to design it, with an ornate Gothic red-brick scheme. The station is a Grade I listed building.

St Pancras came under threat during the 20th century; damaged in both World War I and World War II by bombs, and then in the late 1960s by plans to demolish it entirely and divert services to King's Cross and Euston stations. A passionate campaign to save the station, led by the Victorian Society, Jane Hughes Fawcett, and Poet Laureate John Betjeman, was successful, and St Pancras was awarded Grade I listed status just 10 days before demolition was due to commence.

At the start of the 21st century, the complex underwent an £800 million refurbishment to become the terminal for the Channel Tunnel Rail Link, commonly known as High Speed 1, as part of an urban regeneration plan across East London, and opened by Queen Elizabeth II in November 2007. A security-sealed terminal area was constructed for Eurostar services to mainland Europe via High Speed 1 and the Channel Tunnel, with platforms for domestic trains to the north and south-east of England. In 2016 services began to use the newly-constructed Canal Tunnels to access the below-surface platforms A and B from the East Coast Main Line. The restored station has thirteen numbered platforms, two lettered platforms, a shopping centre, and a coach facility. London St Pancras International is owned by HS1 Ltd and managed by Network Rail (High Speed), a subsidiary of Network Rail.

== Location ==
St Pancras is at the southern end of the London Borough of Camden on a site orientated north–south, deeper than it is wide. The south is bounded by Euston Road (part of the London Inner Ring Road), and its frontage is the St Pancras London Hotel, while the west is bounded by Midland Road, which separates it from the British Library and Francis Crick Institute, and the east by Pancras Road, which separates it from King's Cross station. The British Library is on the former goods yard site. Euston railway station is around ten minutes' walk away along Euston Road.

Behind the hotel, the train shed is elevated 5 metres (16 ft) above street level and the area below forms the station undercroft which is where most of the shops and restaurants are located, along with the Eurostar departure lounge. The northern half of the station is mainly bounded to the east by Camley Street, with Camley Street Natural Park across the road. To the north-east is King's Cross Central, formerly known as the Railway Lands, a complex of intersecting railway lines crossed by several roads and the Regent's Canal.

Several London bus routes have stops nearby, including 73, 205 and 390.

== Domestic station ==
=== Background ===
The station's name comes from the St. Pancras parish, whose name originates from the fourth-century Christian boy martyr Pancras of Rome. The station was commissioned by the Midland Railway (MR), who had a network of routes in the Midlands and in south and west Yorkshire and Lancashire, but no route of its own to London. Before 1857 the MR used the lines of the L&NWR for trains into the capital; subsequently, the company's Leicester and Hitchin Railway gave access to London via the Great Northern Railway (GNR).

In 1862, traffic for the second International Exhibition suffered extensive delays over the stretch of line into London over the GNR's track; the route into the city via the L&NWR was also at capacity, with coal trains causing the network at Rugby and elsewhere to reach effective gridlock. This was the stimulus for the MR to build its own line to London from Bedford, which would be just under 50 miles (80 km) long. Samuel Carter was solicitor for the parliamentary bill, which was sanctioned in 1863.

The main economic justification for the MR extension was for the transport of coal and other goods to the capital, which was hindered by a 1s 9d toll on GNR lines. A large goods station was constructed between 1862 and 1865, sited to the west of the King's Cross coal depot between the North London Railway and the Regent's Canal. Although coal and goods were the main motivation for the London extension, the Midland realised the prestige of having a central London passenger terminus and decided it must have a front on Euston Road. The company purchased the eastern section of land on the road's north side owned by Earl Somers.

=== Construction ===
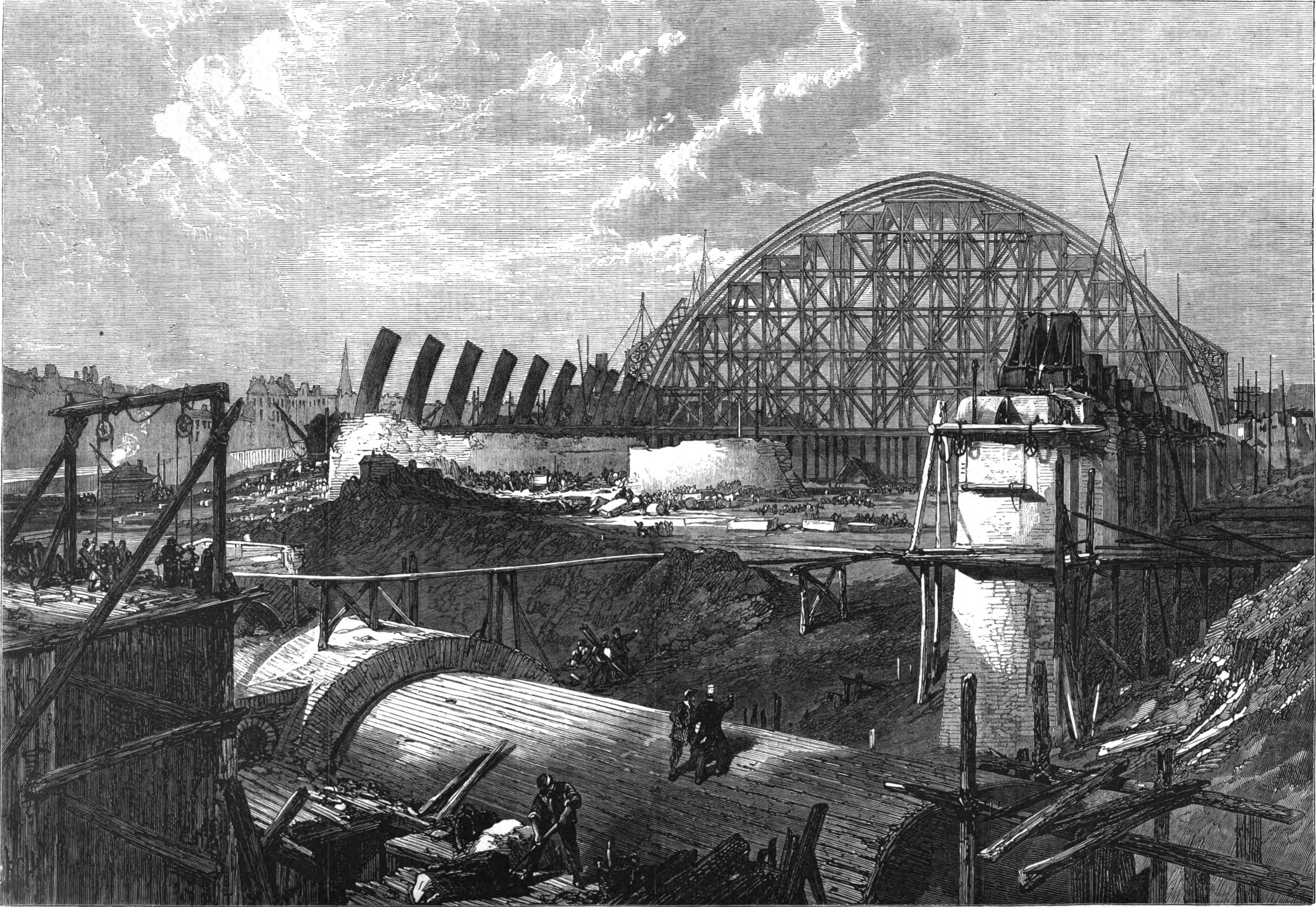
The train shed under construction in 1868

The passenger station was designed by William Henry Barlow and constructed on a site that had previously been a slum called Agar Town.

The approach line to the station crossed over the Regent's Canal at a reasonable gradient, meaning the platforms were 20 ft (6 m) above the ground level. (By contrast, the lines to the adjacent King's Cross station tunnel under the Regent's Canal.) Initial plans were for a two or three span roof with the void between station and ground level filled with spoil from tunnelling to join the Midland Main Line to the St. Pancras branch. Instead, due to the value of the land in such a location the lower area was used for freight, in particular beer from Burton. (Note: Beer traffic was handled in the centre of the station between platforms 4 and 5. A central third track ended in a wagon hoist lowering wagons 20 feet (6 m) below rail level. Beer storage ended in 1967.) As a result, the undercroft was built with columns and girders, maximising space, set out to the same plans as those used for beer warehouses, and with a basic unit of length that of a beer barrel.

The contract to build the station substructure and connecting lines was given to Messrs. Waring, with Barlow's assistant Campion as supervisor. The lower floor for beer warehousing contained interior columns 15 ft (4.6 m) wide and 48 ft (14.6 m) deep, carrying girders supporting the main station and track. The connection to the Widened Lines (St. Pancras branch) ran below the station's bottom level, in an east-to-west direction.

To avoid the foundations of the roof interfering with the space beneath, simplify the design and minimise cost, it was decided to construct a single span roof, with cross ties for the arch at the station level. The arch was sprung directly from the station level, with no piers. Additional advice on the design of the roof was given to Barlow by Rowland Mason Ordish. The arches' ribs had a web depth of 6 ft (1.8 m), mostly open ironwork. The span width, from wall to wall was 245 ft 6 in (74.83 m), with a rib every 29 ft 4 in (8.94 m). The arch was a slightly pointed design, with a reduced radius of curvature at the springing points. The Butterley Company was contracted to construct the arches. The total cost of the 24-rib roof and glazing was over £53,000, of which over half was for the main ribs. The cost of the gable end was a further £8,500.

The single-span overall roof was the largest such structure in the world at the time of its completion. The materials used were wrought iron framework of lattice design, with glass covering the middle half and timber (inside)/slate (outside) covering the outer quarters. The two end screens were glazed in a vertical rectangular grid pattern with decorative timber cladding around the edge and wrought iron finials around the outer edge. It was 689 feet (210 m) long, 240 feet (73.2 m) wide, and 100 feet (30.5 m) high at the apex above the tracks.

Local services began running to the Metropolitan Railway junction underneath the terminus on 13 July 1868. The station itself opened to the public on 1 October. The first service was an overnight mail train from Leeds.

=== Early services ===
St Pancras was built during a period of expansion for the MR, as the major routes to Manchester, Nottingham, Sheffield and Carlisle opened during this time. By 1902, there were 150 trains arriving and leaving the station daily, though this was far less than at Waterloo or Liverpool Street. As well as Midland services, the Great Eastern Railway (GER) used St Pancras as a "West End" terminus for trains to Great Yarmouth, Norwich, Lowestoft between 1870 and 1917. At the turn of the 20th century, St Pancras had a faster service to Cambridge than from King's Cross, at 71 minutes. GER services were suspended because of World War I and never resumed.

The London, Tilbury and Southend Railway (LTSR) began boat train services from St Pancras from 9 July 1894, following the opening of the Tottenham and Forest Gate Railway. The trains ran from St Pancras to Tilbury via South Tottenham and Barking. Tilbury Docks then provided a connection to Australia and Scandinavia. The following year, the LTSR began a service from St Pancras to Southend Central. Boat trains continued to run from St Pancras until 1963, after which they were moved to Liverpool Street and Fenchurch Street.

=== Grouping, nationalisation and privatisation ===
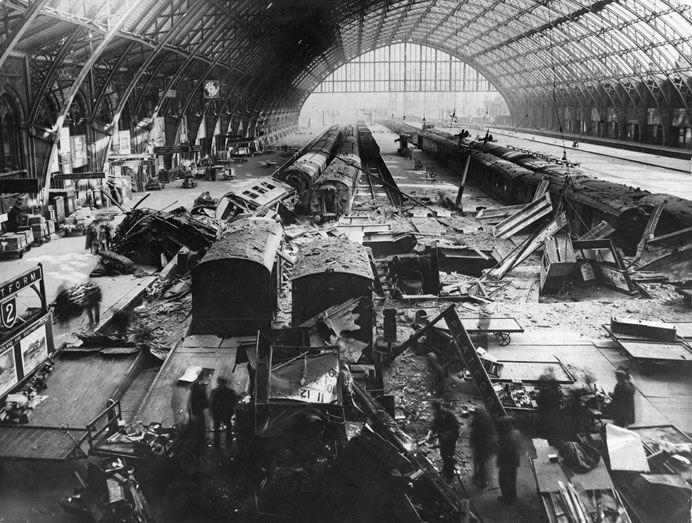
The station was damaged by a bomb in May 1941 during the Blitz.

The Railways Act 1921 forced the merger of the Midland with the London and North Western Railway (L&NWR) into the London, Midland and Scottish Railway (LMS), and the LMS adopted the LNWR's (the "Premier Line") Euston station as its principal London terminus. The Midland Grand Hotel was closed in 1935, and the building was subsequently used as offices for British Railways. During World War II, bombing inflicted damage on the train shed, which was only partially reglazed after the war. On the night of 10–11 May 1941 a bomb fell onto the station floor at platform 3, exploding in the beer vaults underneath. The station was not significantly damaged, but was closed for eight days, with platforms 2–3 remaining closed until June. In 1947 the St. Pancras junction was relaid with prefabricated trackwork, along with associated changes to the signalling system.

On the creation of British Railways (BR) in 1948, St Pancras received a significant investment after neglect by the LMS. Destinations included the London area services to North Woolwich, St Albans and Bedford. Long-distance trains reached Glasgow, Leeds, Nottingham, Sheffield and Manchester, with famous named trains including The Palatine to Manchester, The Thames-Clyde Express to Glasgow, and The Master Cutler to Sheffield (transferred from King's Cross in 1966, which itself had transferred from Marylebone eight years earlier).

On 7 October 1957, the signalling at St Pancras was upgraded, replacing the three original boxes with a power box controlling 205 route switches and 33 points over a network of 1,400 relays. From 1960 to 1966, electrification work on the West Coast Main Line between London and Manchester saw a new Midland Pullman from Manchester to St Pancras. These trains and those to Glasgow were withdrawn following the completion of the rebuilding of Euston and the consolidation of these services.

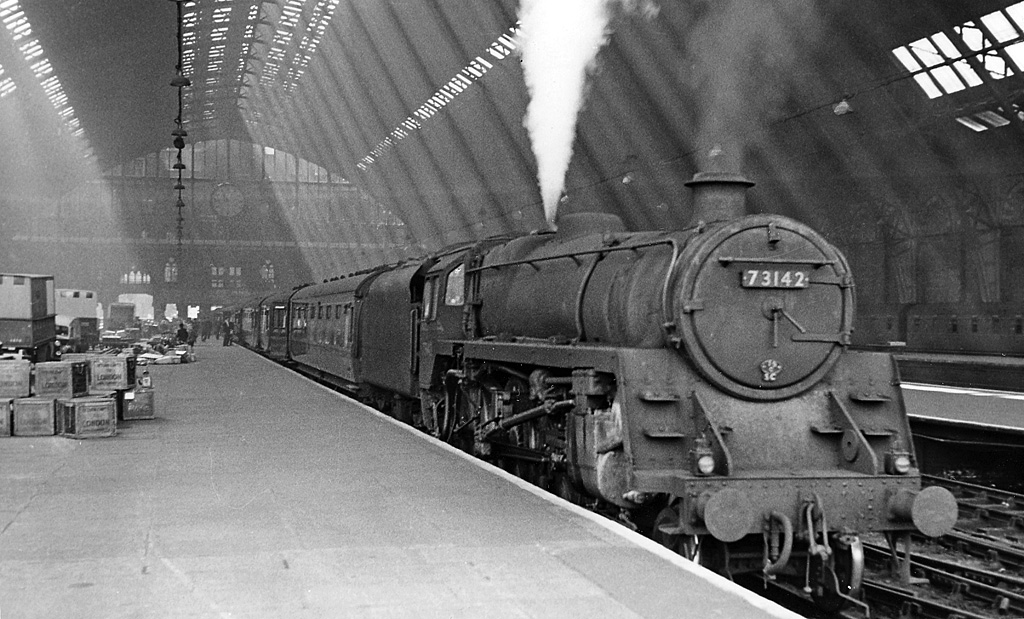
An express to Leicester awaiting departure in 1957

By the 1960s, St Pancras was seen as redundant, and several attempts were made to close it and demolish the hotel (by then known as St Pancras Chambers). These attempts provoked strong and successful opposition, with the campaign led by the later Poet Laureate, John Betjeman. Jane Hughes Fawcett with the Victorian Society was instrumental in its preservation, and was dubbed "the furious Mrs. Fawcett" by British rail officials. Many of the demonstrators had witnessed the demolition of the nearby Euston Arch a few years previously and were strongly opposed to the distinctive architecture of St Pancras suffering the same fate. The station was given Grade I listed building status in November 1967, preventing any drastic modifications. The plans were scrapped by BR in December 1968, realising that it was more cost-effective to modernise the hotel instead, though they disliked owning it.

In the 1970s, the train shed roof was in danger of collapse, and the newly appointed Director of Environment Bernard Kaukas persuaded the company to invest £3 million to save it.

In 1978, British Rail attempted to raise funds with the sale of the impressive 18-foot-diameter station clock, allegedly to a wealthy American collector for £250,000. Custom-made for St Pancras station by the world-renowned Dent, the unique time-piece was somehow dropped during removal, shattering on the floor below. Now worth far less money, it was sold to Roland Hoggard, a train-guard nearing retirement, for £25. It took over a week for Hoggard to transport the giant broken clock, a few parts at a time, to his Nottinghamshire home. He diligently pieced it back together to hang on the wall of his barn, where it still kept good time. Decades later during the station's renewal as 'St Pancras International', Dent of London were able to create an exact replica of the clock by using the original as a template. Hoggard was invited to the 2007 grand re-opening of St Pancras and saw the impressive new clock installed exactly where the original had been.

Also in 1978, a Private Eye piece claimed that British Rail really wanted to demolish St Pancras but were opposed by "a lot of long-haired sentimentalists" and "faceless bureaucrats" and praised the office blocks that replaced the Euston Arch. The station offices in the listed former Midland Grand Hotel building were subsequently refurbished in 1993, including a new roof with 275 tonnes of Westmorland Green slate.

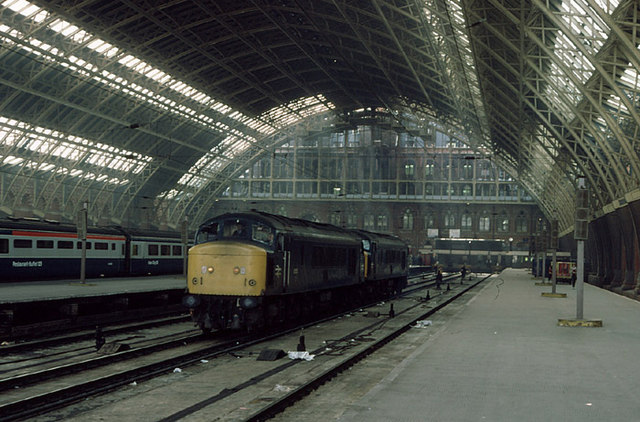
St Pancras, semi-derelict in 1984

After the sectorisation of British Rail in 1986, main-line services to the East Midlands were provided by the InterCity sector, with suburban services to St Albans, Luton and Bedford by Network SouthEast. In 1988 the Snow Hill tunnel re-opened resulting in the creation of the Thameslink route and the resultant diversion of the majority of suburban trains to the new route. The station continued to be served by trains running on the Midland mainline to Leicester, Nottingham and Sheffield, together with a few suburban services to Bedford and Luton. These constituted only a few trains an hour and left the station underused.

Following the privatisation of British Rail, the long-distance services from St Pancras were franchised to Midland Mainline, a train operating company owned by National Express, starting on 28 April 1996. The few remaining suburban trains still operating into St Pancras were operated by the Thameslink train operating company, owned by Govia, from 2 March 1997.

A small number of trains to and from Leeds were introduced, mainly because the High-Speed Train sets were maintained there and were already running empty north of Sheffield. During the 2000s major rebuild of the West Coast Main Line, St Pancras again temporarily hosted direct and regular inter-city trains to Manchester, this time via the Hope Valley route (via the Dore South curve) under the title of Project Rio.

== International station ==
=== Design ===
The original plan for the Channel Tunnel Rail Link (CTRL) involved a tunnel from south-east of London to an underground terminus in the vicinity of King's Cross. However, a late change of plan, principally driven by the then Secretary of State for the Environment Michael Heseltine's desire for urban regeneration in east London, led to a change of route, with the new line approaching London from the east. This opened the possibility of reusing St Pancras as the terminus, with access via the North London Line, which crosses the throat of the station.

The idea of using the North London line was rejected in 1994 by the transport secretary, John MacGregor, as "difficult to construct and environmentally damaging". However, the idea of using St Pancras station as the terminus was retained, albeit now linked by 12.4 miles (20 km) of new tunnels to Dagenham via Stratford.

London and Continental Railways (LCR), created at the time of British Rail privatisation, was selected by the government in 1996 to reconstruct St Pancras, build the CTRL, and take over the British share of the Eurostar operation. LCR had owned St Pancras station since privatisation to allow the station to be redeveloped. Financial difficulties in 1998, and the collapse of Railtrack in 2001, caused some revision of this plan, but LCR retained ownership of the station.

International platforms, under the large train shed

The design and project management of reconstruction was undertaken on behalf of LCR by Rail Link Engineering (RLE), a consortium of Bechtel, Arup, Systra and Halcrow. The original reference design for the station was by Nick Derbyshire, former head of British Rail's in-house architecture team. The master plan of the complex was by Foster and Partners, and the lead architect of the reconstruction was Alistair Lansley, a former colleague of Nick Derbyshire recruited by RLE.

To accommodate the over-300-metre-long (980 ft) Eurostar trains, and to provide capacity for the existing trains to the Midlands and the new Kent services on the high-speed rail link, the train shed was extended a considerable distance northwards by a new flat-roofed shed. The station was initially planned to have 13 platforms under this extended train shed. East Midlands services would use the western platforms, Eurostar services the middle platforms, and Kent services the eastern platforms. The Eurostar platforms and one of the Midland platforms would extend back into the Barlow train shed. Access to Eurostar for departing passengers would be via a departure suite on the west of the station, and then to the platforms by a bridge above the tracks within the historic train shed. Arriving Eurostar passengers would leave the station by a new concourse at its north end.

Shopping area in the undercroft

This original design was later modified, with access to the Eurostar platforms from below, using the station undercroft and allowing the deletion of the visually intrusive bridge. By dropping the extension of any of the Midland platforms into the train shed, space was freed up to allow wells to be constructed in the station floor, which provided daylight and access to the undercroft.

The reconstruction of the station was recorded in the BBC Television documentary series The Eight Hundred Million Pound Railway Station broadcast as six 30-minute episodes between 13‒28 November 2007.

International departures waiting area

St Pancras International and the Eurotunnel Folkestone Terminal are the only UK railway stations with juxtaposed immigration control facilities set up by the French Police Border Guard and French Customs to clear passengers for entry into France and the rest of the Schengen Area prior to boarding the trains. Passengers do not need any further immigration or passport checks after entering the main departure gates, or at the corresponding gate at the other end on return journeys, as they are cleared by the UK Border Force.

=== Rebuilding ===
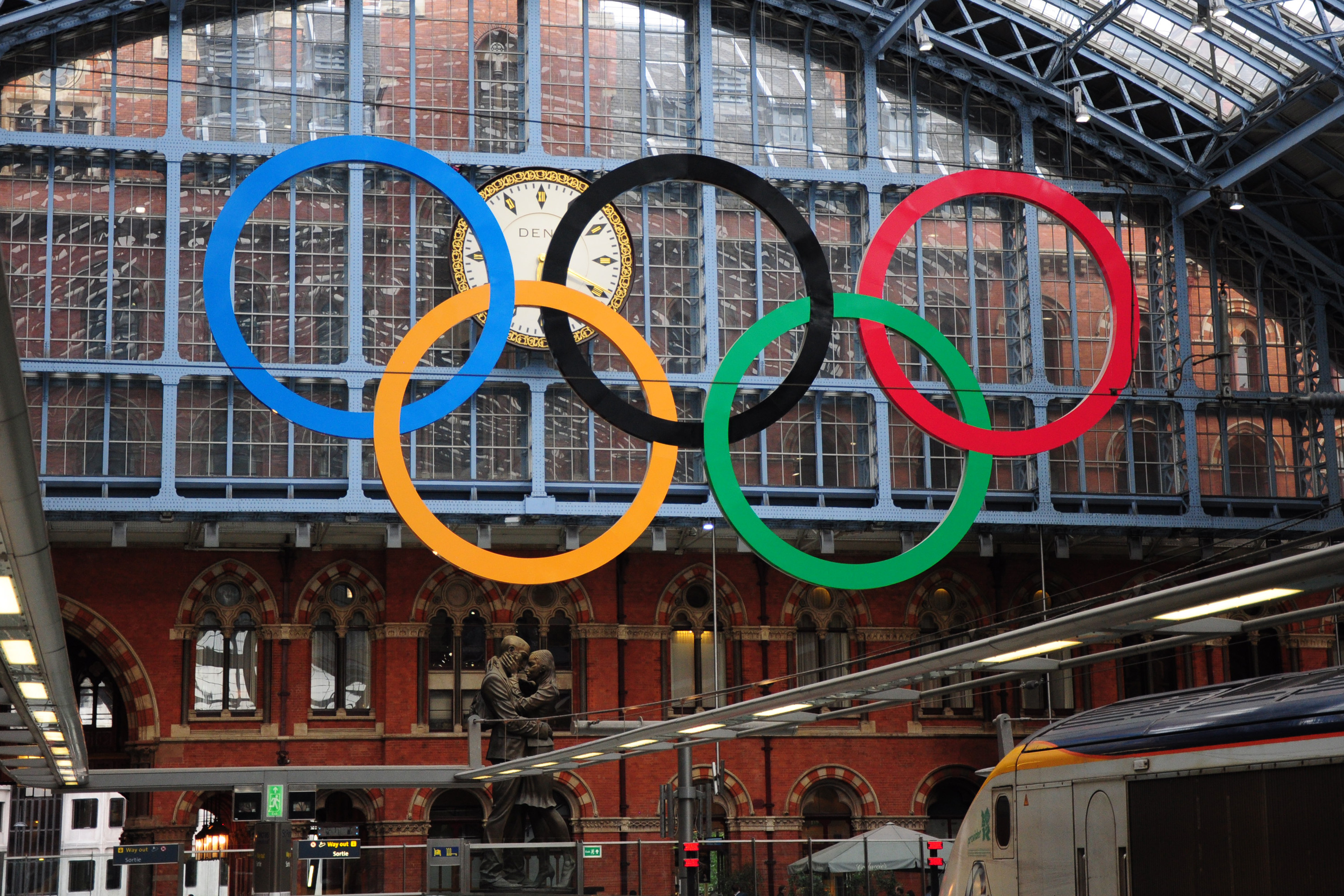
The Meeting Place and the Olympic Rings for the 2012 Summer Olympics

By early 2004, the eastern side of the extended train shed was complete, and the Barlow train shed was closed to trains. As part of the construction of the western side of the new train shed that now began, an underground "box" was constructed to house new platforms for Thameslink, which at this point ran partially under the extended station. In order for this to happen, the existing Thameslink tunnels between Kentish Town and King's Cross Thameslink were closed between 11 September 2004 and 15 May 2005 while the works were carried out. Thameslink services from the north terminated in the same platforms as the Midland Main Line trains, while services from the south terminated at King's Cross Thameslink.

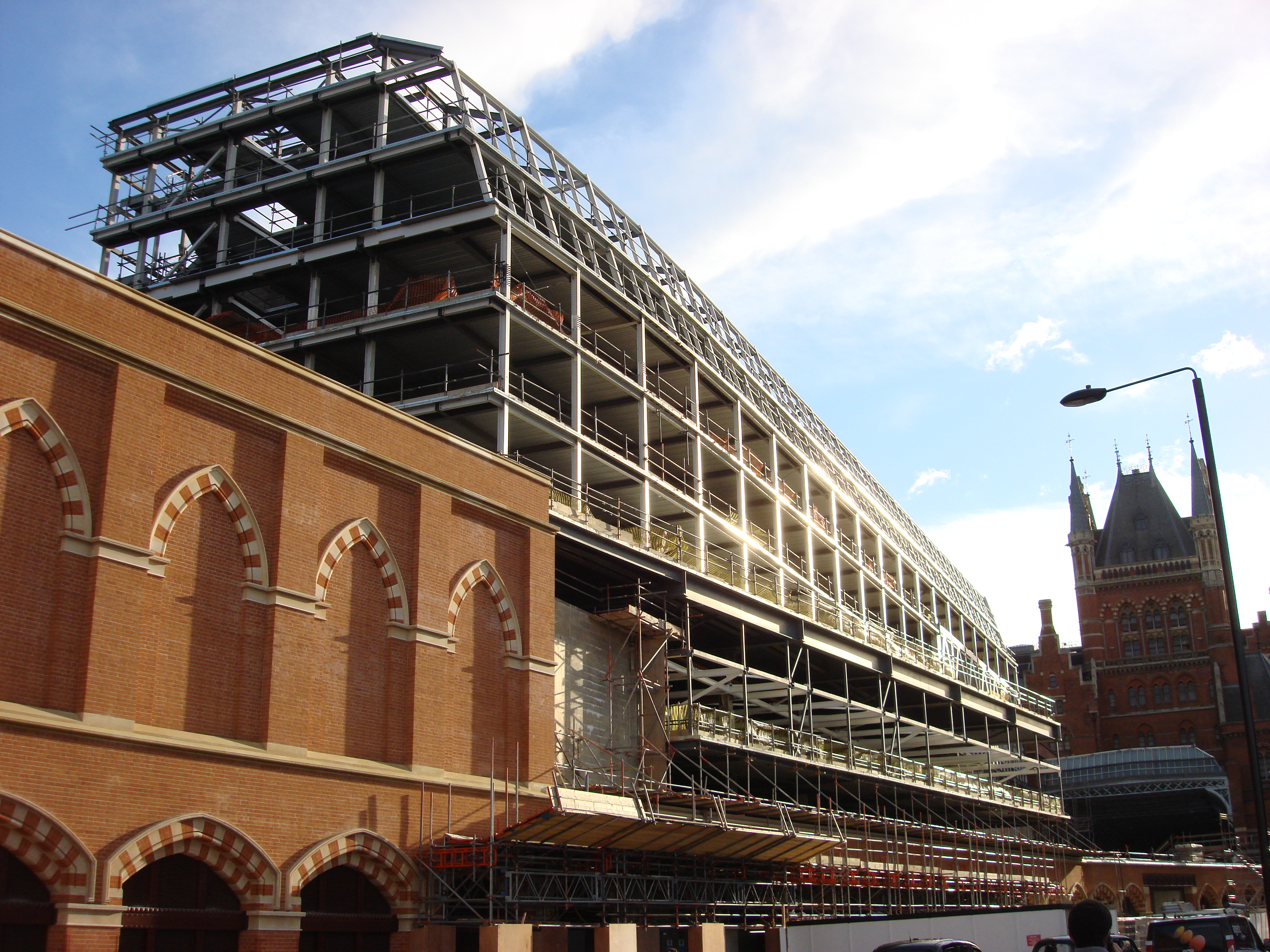
St Pancras Renaissance London Hotel extension under construction in 2007

When the lines were re-opened, the new station box was still only a bare concrete shell and could not take passengers. Thameslink trains reverted to their previous route but ran through the station box without stopping. The budget for the Channel Tunnel Rail Link works did not include work on the fitting out of the station, as these works had originally been part of the separate Thameslink 2000 works programme. Despite lobbying by rail operators who wished to see the station open at the same time as St Pancras International, the Government failed to provide additional funding to allow the fit-out works to be completed immediately following the line blockade. Eventually, on 8 February 2006, Alistair Darling, the Secretary of State for Transport, announced £50 million funding for the fit-out of the station, plus another £10–15 million for the installation of associated signalling and other lineside works.

The fit-out works were designed by Chapman Taylor and Arup (Eurostar) and completed by ISG Interior Plc Contractors collaborating with Bechtel as Project Managers. The client was London and Continental Railways who were advised by Hitachi Consulting.

In 2005, planning consent was granted for a refurbishment of the former Midland Grand Hotel building, with plans to refurbish and extend it as a hotel and apartment block. The newly refurbished hotel opened to guests on 21 March 2011 with a grand opening ceremony on 5 May.

By the middle of 2006, the western side of the train shed extension was completed. The rebuilding cost was in the region of £800 million, up from an initial estimate of £310 million.

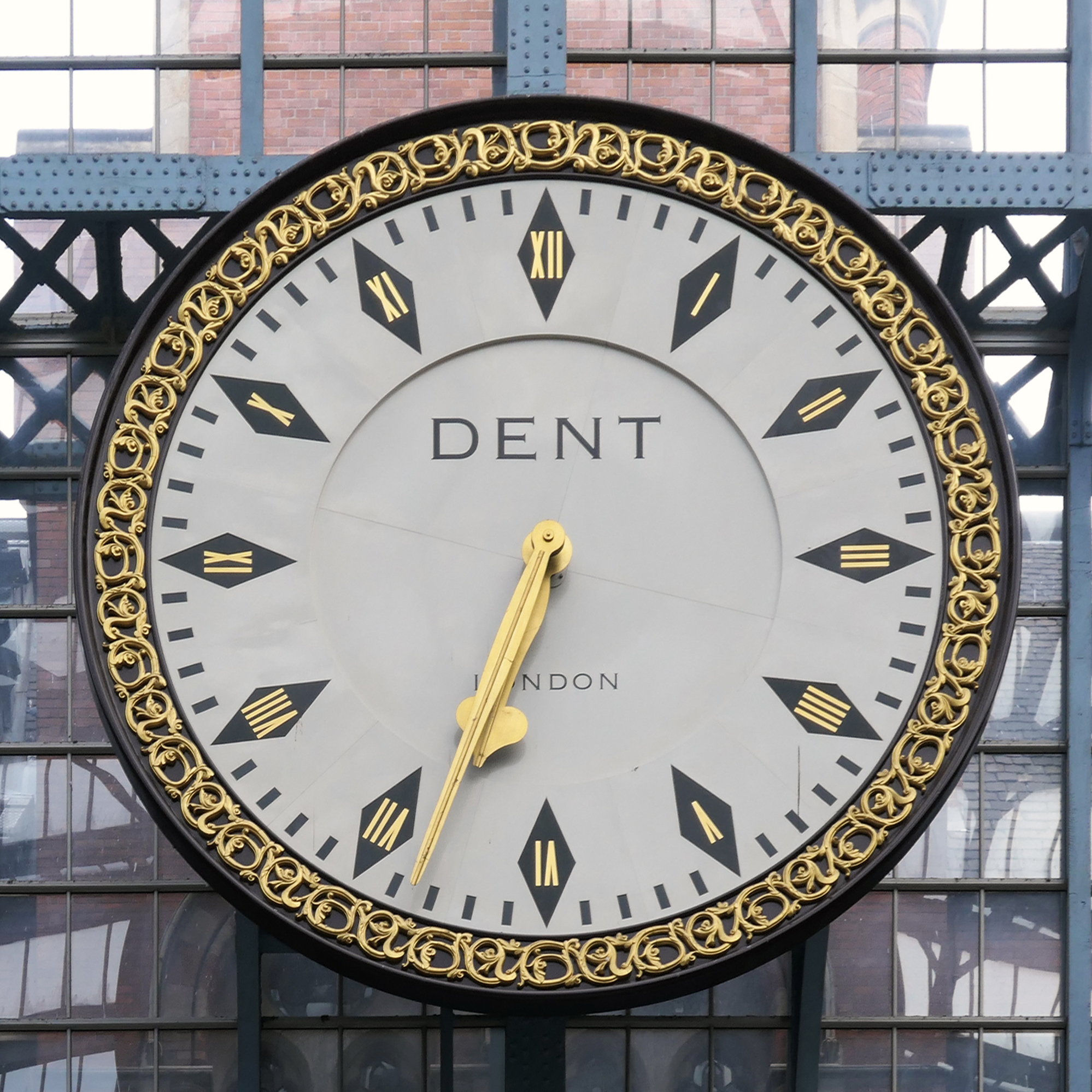
Dent Clock, St Pancras Station

During the 2007 restoration for High Speed 1, a new platform clock was produced by Dent in partnership with Smith of Derby; the 18-ft dial used fragments of a Victorian dial reassembled by railwayman Roland Hoggard as reference.

=== Opening ===
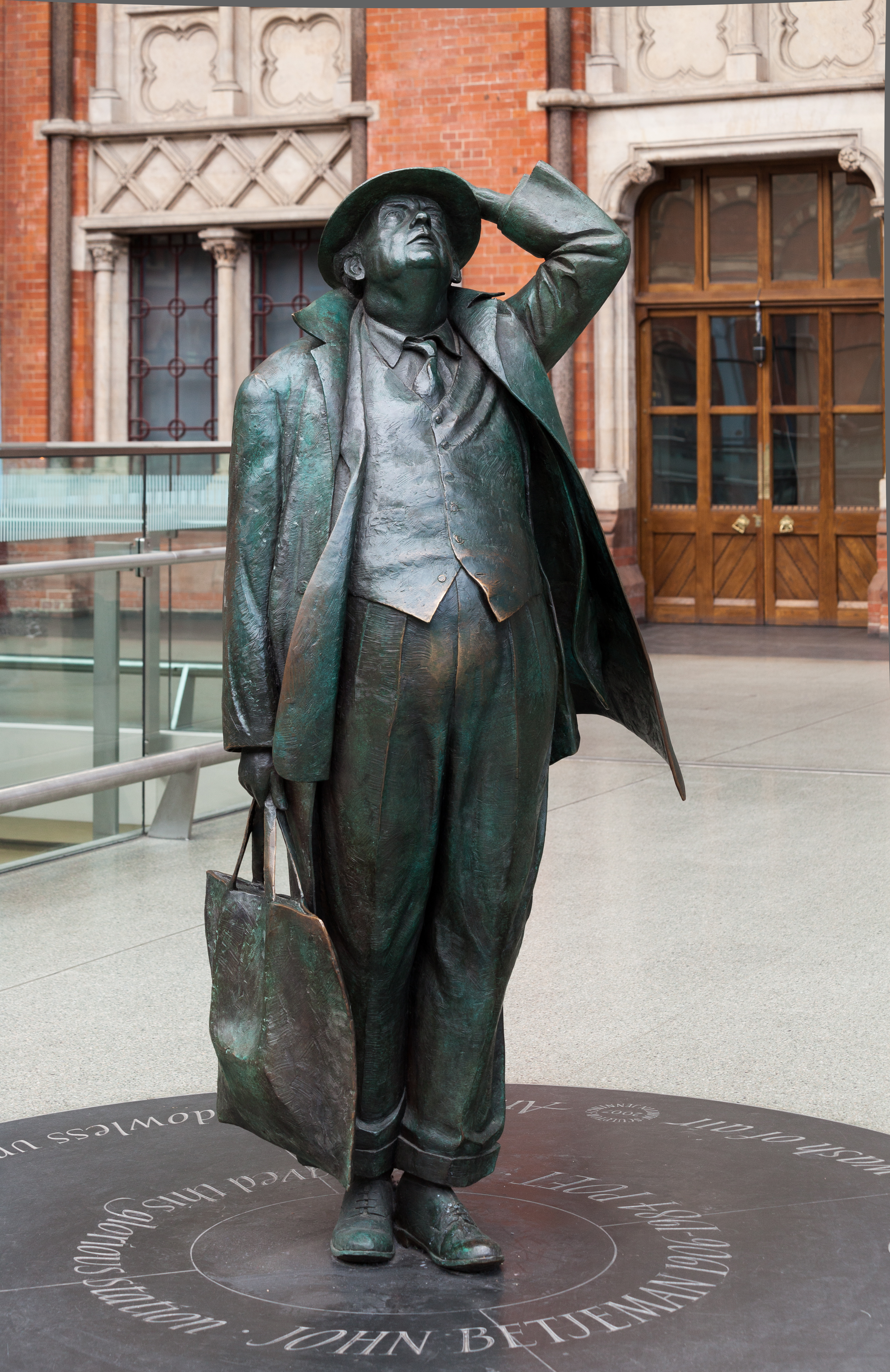
Statue of John Betjeman at St Pancras Station

In early November 2007, Eurostar conducted a testing programme in which some 6000 members of the public were involved in passenger check-in, immigration control and departure trials, during which the "passengers" each made three return journeys out of St Pancras to the entrance to the London tunnel. On 4 September 2007, the first test train ran from Paris Gare du Nord to St Pancras. Children's illustrator Quentin Blake was commissioned to provide a huge mural of an "imaginary welcoming committee" as a disguise for one of the remaining ramshackle Stanley Building South immediately opposite the station exit.

St Pancras was officially re-opened as St Pancras International, and the High Speed 1 service was launched on 6 November 2007 by Queen Elizabeth II and Prince Philip, Duke of Edinburgh. Services were extended to Rotterdam and Amsterdam in April 2018.

During an elaborate opening ceremony, actor Timothy West, as Henry Barlow, addressed the audience, which was also entertained by the Royal Philharmonic Orchestra and the singers Lemar and Katherine Jenkins. In a carefully staged set piece, the first Class 395 train and two Class 373 trains arrived through a cloud of dry ice in adjacent platforms within seconds of each other. During the ceremony, Paul Day's large bronze statue The Meeting Place was also unveiled. At a much smaller ceremony on 12 November 2007, the bronze statue of John Betjeman by sculptor Martin Jennings was unveiled by Betjeman's daughter, the author Candida Lycett Green. Public service by Eurostar train via High Speed 1 started on 14 November 2007. In a small ceremony, station staff cut a ribbon leading to the Eurostar platforms. In the same month, services to the East Midlands were transferred to a new franchisee, East Midlands Trains. The low-level Thameslink platforms opened on 9 December 2007, replacing King's Cross Thameslink.

St Pancras has retained a reputation of having one of the most recognisable facades of all the London termini, and known as the "cathedral of the railways". The station has bilingual signs in French and English, one of the few in England to do so. In Britain's 100 Best Railway Stations by Simon Jenkins, the station was one of only ten to be awarded five stars. In 2020, the US-based lobby organisation Consumer Choice Center, in its “European Railway Station Index” that compares “Europe’s Top 50 railway stations”, put St Pancras in first place. It was considered Europe's most passenger-friendly railway station in an index created in 2020 by the Consumer Choice Center.

=== Canal Tunnels ===
From December 2018, as part of the Thameslink Programme, Govia Thameslink Railway under the "Thameslink" brand began to use the below-surface platforms from the East Coast Main Line, where they previously would have terminated at King's Cross. These trains can now continue through central London to Sussex and Kent. This link was made possible by the construction of a pair of single-track tunnels, named the Canal Tunnels; these tunnels start immediately off the St Pancras Thameslink platforms, dive under the Regent's Canal, and join the East Coast Main Line where the North London Line and High Speed 1 pass over the top.

=== Twinning ===
Plaque in Bordeaux commemorating the twinning.

In October 2019, St Pancras was twinned with the Gare de Bordeaux Saint-Jean, Bordeaux, France. The association was made in the hope that a high-speed service could connect the two stations and was announced at a ceremony headed by Claude Solard, Director General of SNCF.

== Platform layout ==
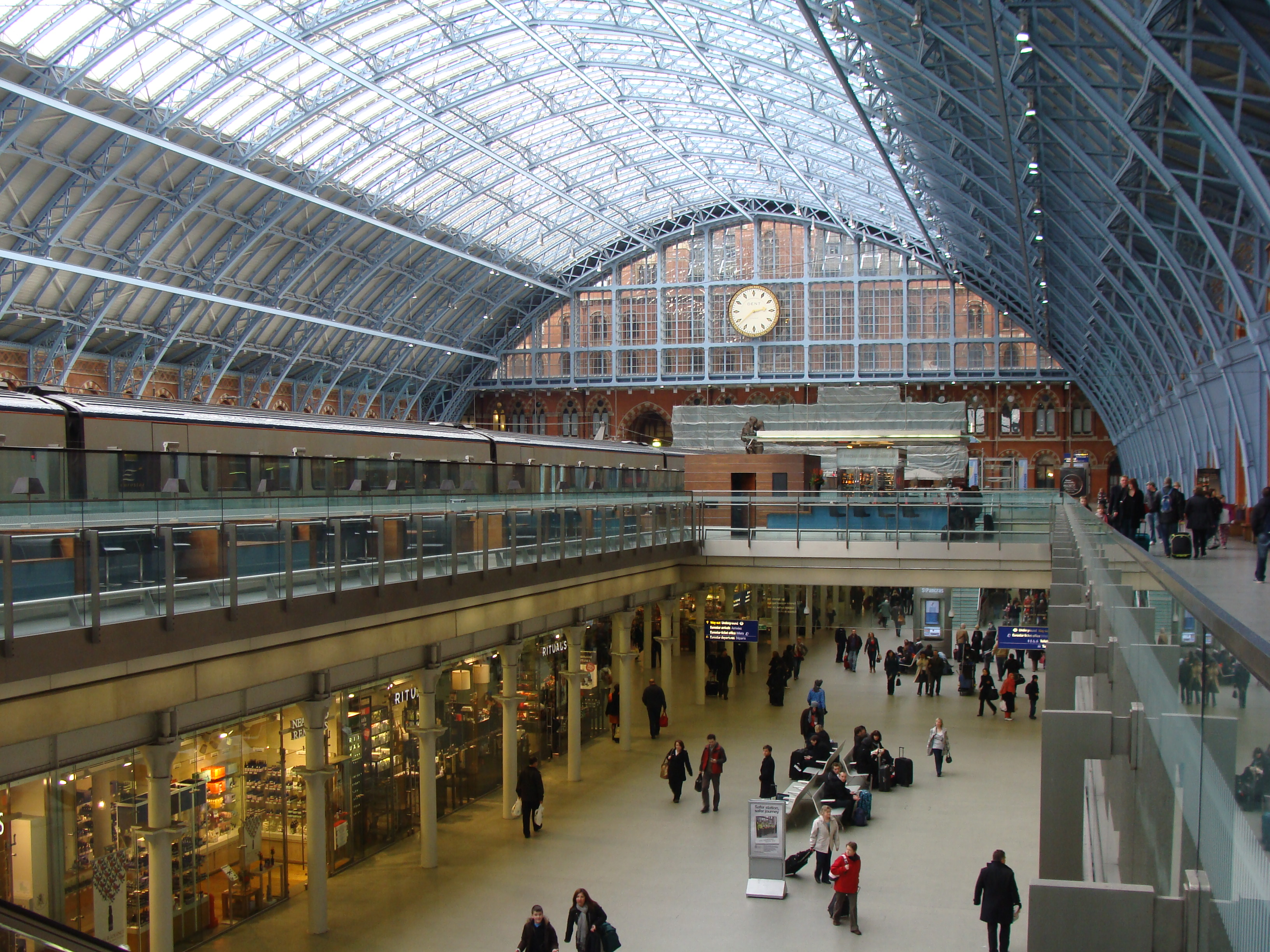
Interior of the station, with a Eurostar train awaiting departure on the left

St Pancras contains four groups of platforms on two levels, accessed via the main concourse at ground level. The below-surface group contains through platforms A and B, and the upper level has three groups of terminal platforms: domestic platforms 1–4 and 11–13 on each side of international platforms 5–10. Platforms A & B serve Thameslink, 1–4 connect to the Midland Main Line, while platforms 5–13 lead to High Speed 1; there is no connection between the two lines, except for a maintenance siding outside the station. There are also a variety of shops and restaurants within the station concourse.

The longer international platforms, used by Eurostar, extend into Barlow's train shed, whilst the other platforms terminate at the southern end of the 2005 extension. The international platforms do not occupy the full width of the Barlow train shed, and sections of the floor area have been opened up to provide natural light to the new ground-level concourse below. Eurostar's arrival and departure lounges lie below these platforms, adjacent to The Arcade, a concourse fashioned from the original station undercroft which runs along the western length of the Barlow train shed. The southern end of The Arcade links to the western ticket hall of King's Cross St Pancras tube station.

The East Midlands Railway platforms are at the northern end of The Arcade, while the Thameslink and domestic High Speed platforms are reached via a street-level concourse where the old and new parts of the station meet. The main pedestrian entrance is at the eastern end of this concourse, where a subway enables pedestrians to reach King's Cross station and the northern ticket hall of the tube station.

== Services ==
=== Domestic services ===
==== East Midlands Railway and Luton Airport Express ====
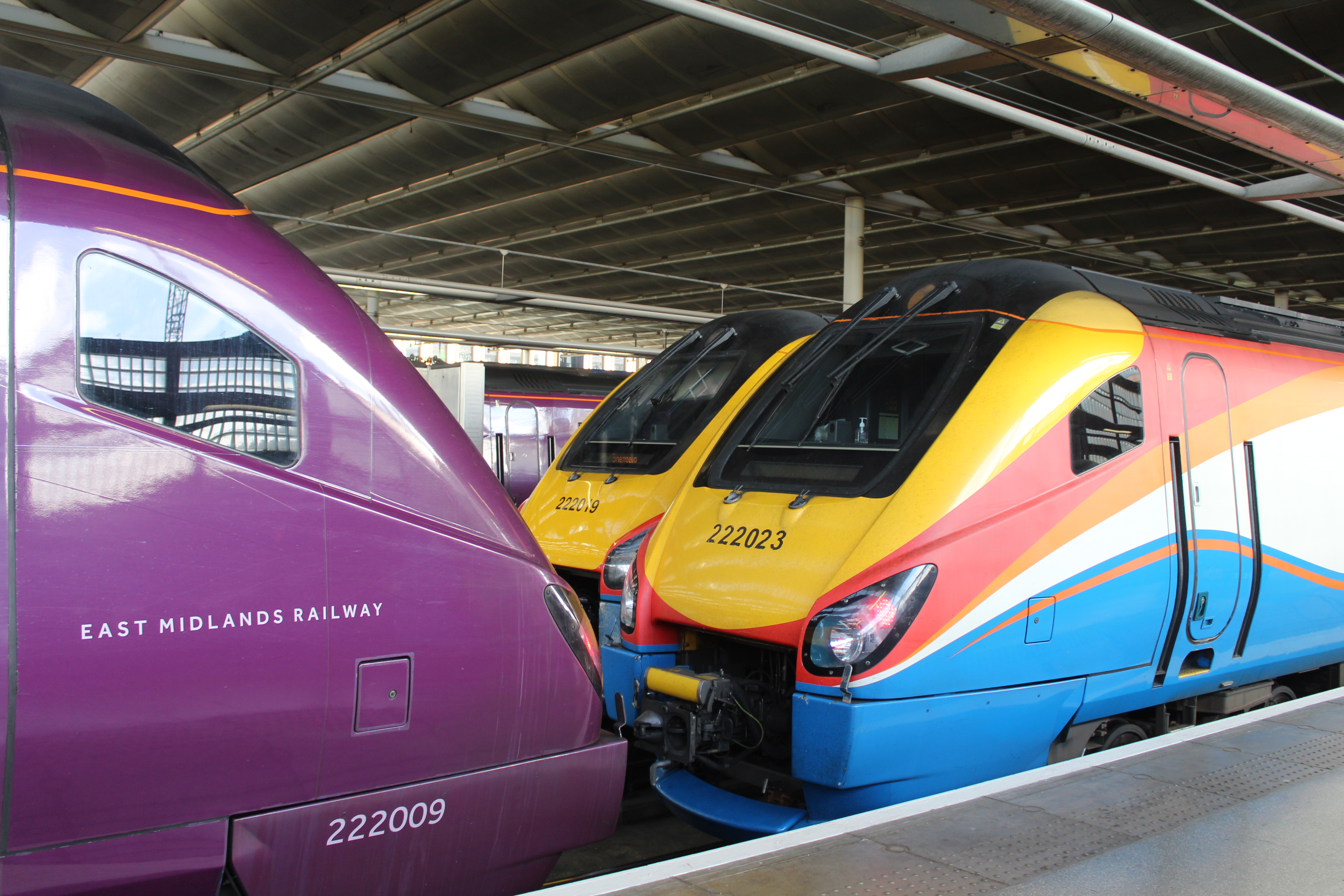
An array of EMR InterCity Class 222s at London St Pancras International

Since 2019, platforms 1–4 have been the southern terminus for Midland Main Line services operated by East Midlands Railway under the 'EMR InterCity' brand to and from the East Midlands and Yorkshire, including Leicester, Nottingham, Derby, Chesterfield and Sheffield, using Class 222 'Meridian' diesel-electric multiple units and Class 810 bi-mode units. Occasional EMR InterCity services also run to Melton Mowbray and Lincoln.

East Midlands Railway also operate semi-fast commuter services to and from Kettering and Corby from platforms 1–4, referred to as 'Connect' services. Since 2023, this has been advertised as a separate brand, "Luton Airport Express", operating Class 360 electric multiple units.

Previously, East Midlands Railway operated occasional services to Leeds, York and Scarborough. Trains to and from York and Scarborough ceased to operate from 2020 onwards, with services to Leeds being discontinued in spring 2022.

As of May 2023, the Monday-Saturday off-peak timetable sees six trains per hour (tph):

- 2 tph to Corby via Luton Airport Parkway, Luton, Bedford, Wellingborough and Kettering (Luton Airport Express)
- 2 tph to Nottingham (1 fast, 1 semi-fast) via Kettering, Market Harborough and Leicester
- 2 tph to Sheffield (1 fast, 1 semi-fast) via Leicester, Derby and Chesterfield

These platforms can also be used by Thameslink trains terminating at the station. In the regular timetable, a small number of Thameslink services use these platforms on Sunday mornings.

==== Thameslink ====
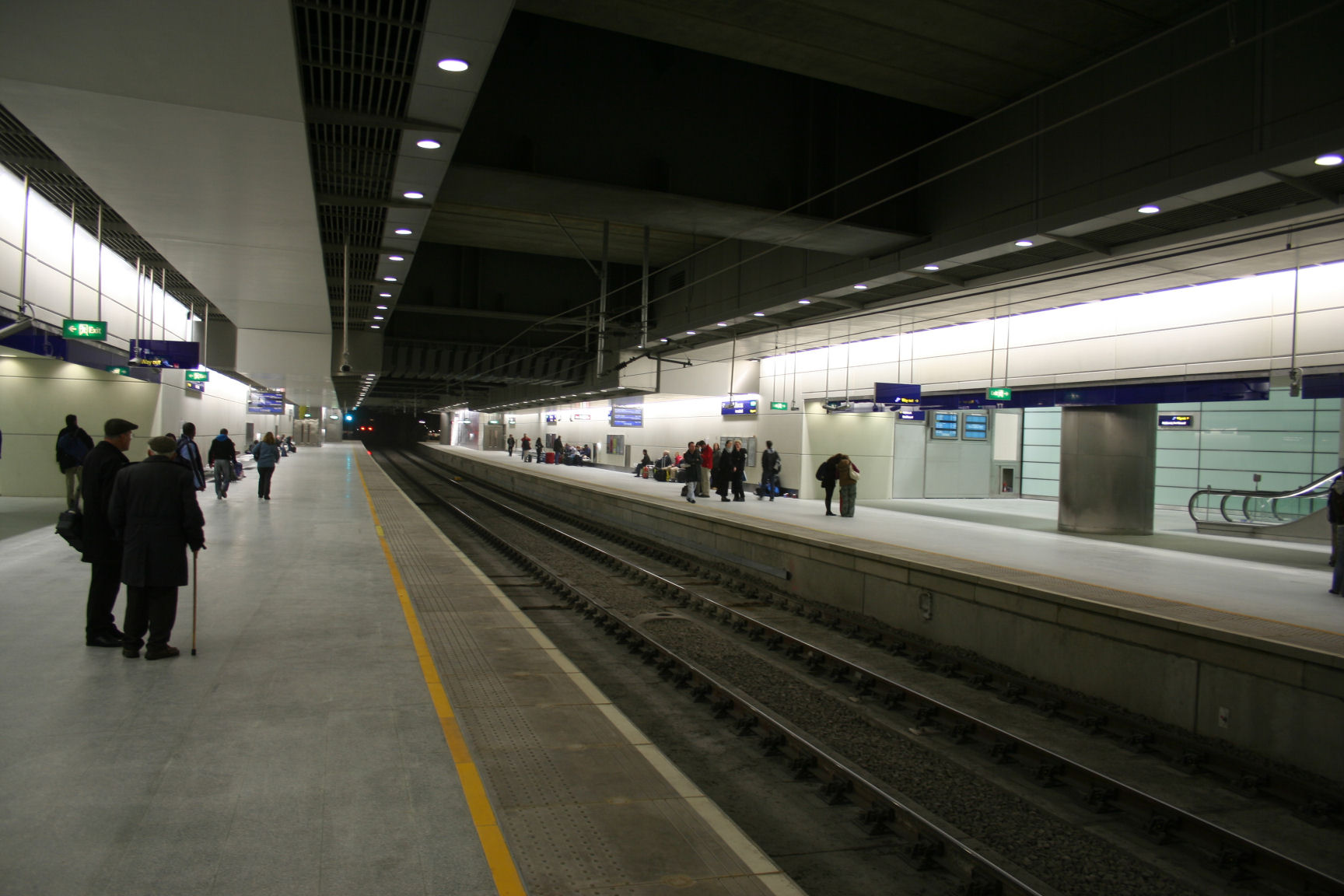
Thameslink platforms at St Pancras (2007)

As part of the Thameslink Programme, St Pancras International gained platforms on the Thameslink route, replacing King's Cross Thameslink to the south-east. As at that station, the new Thameslink platforms were designated A and B.

The project involved the introduction of eight- and twelve-car Class 700 electric trains across the enlarged Thameslink network. As extending the platforms at King's Cross Thameslink was thought to be impractical (requiring alterations to Clerkenwell No 3 tunnel and the Circle, Hammersmith & City and Metropolitan Underground lines, which would have been extremely disruptive and prohibitively expensive), it was decided to build new Thameslink platforms under St Pancras.

The typical off-peak weekday Thameslink service in per hour (tph):

- 4 tph to Bedford via St Albans City and Luton
- 2 tph to Luton (semi-fast) via St Albans City
- 4 tph to St Albans City (stopping) via Elstree & Borehamwood
- 2 tph to Peterborough via Stevenage
- 2 tph to Cambridge via Stevenage and Letchworth Garden City
- 4 tph to Brighton via Gatwick Airport and Three Bridges
- 2 tph to Three Bridges via East Croydon
- 2 tph to Rainham via Dartford
- 2 tph to Sutton via Wimbledon
- 2 tph to Sutton via Mitcham Junction
- 2 tph to Horsham via Redhill and Three Bridges

There are additional peak-hour services to Orpington, Welwyn Garden City, Sevenoaks and East Grinstead.

==== Southeastern ====
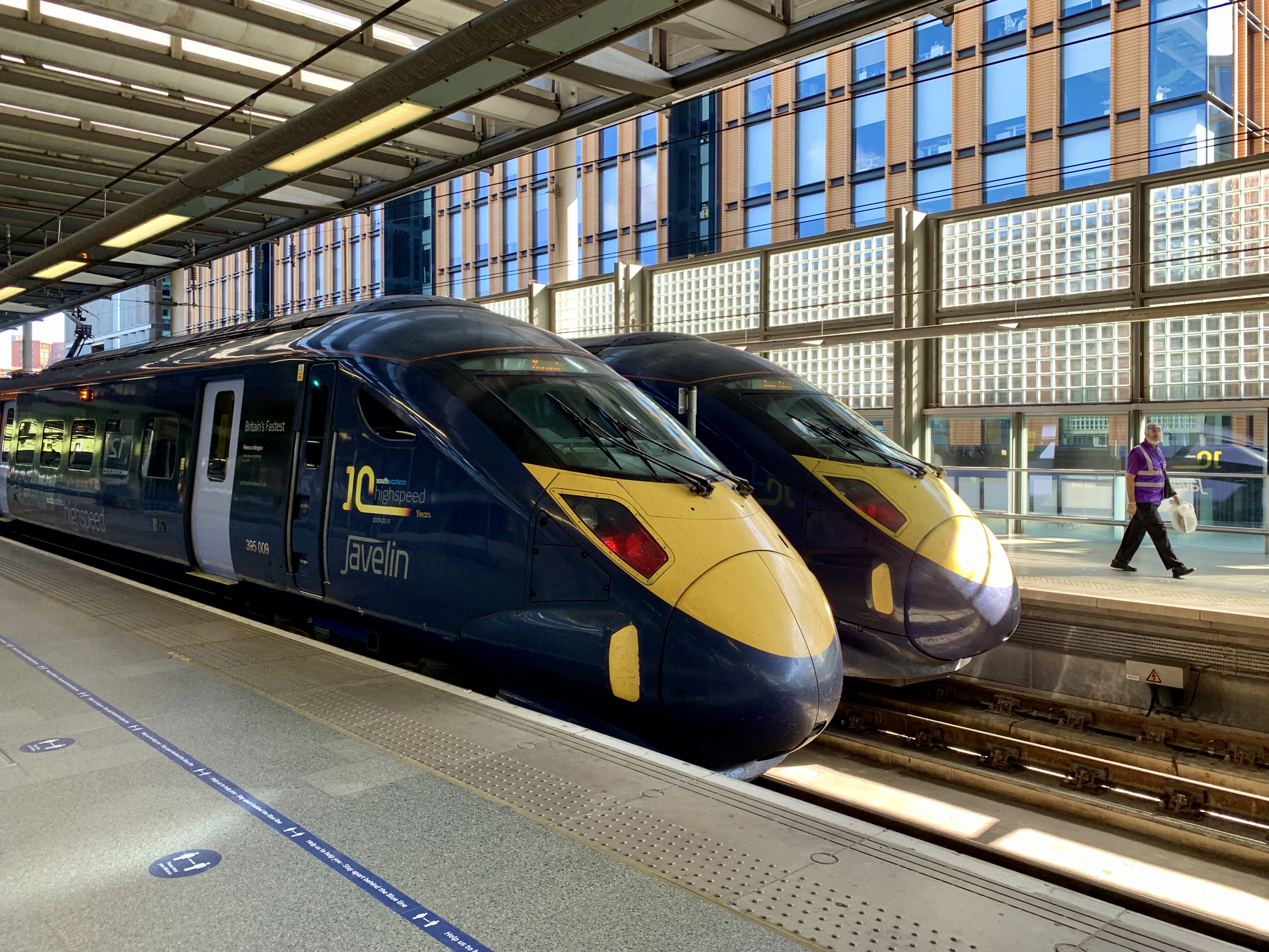
The high speed domestic platforms with Class 395 Javelins

Southeastern runs high-speed Class 395 trains on High Speed 1 to Kent and the South East, to Faversham, Margate, Ramsgate, Canterbury West, Dover Priory, Folkestone Central, Ashford International, Ebbsfleet International and other destinations in Kent.

The first domestic service carrying passengers over High Speed 1 ran on 12 December 2008, to mark one year before regular services were due to begin. This special service, carrying various dignitaries, ran from Ashford International to St Pancras. Starting in June 2009, Southeastern provided a preview service between St Pancras and Ebbsfleet, extending to Ashford International during peak hours. In September, Southeastern extended the peak-time services to Dover and Ramsgate. The full service began on 13 December.

The typical off-peak weekday Southeastern service sees four trains per hour (tph):

- 2 tph to Faversham via Gravesend, of which 1 continues to Ramsgate
- 1 tph to Ramsgate via Dover Priory
- 1 tph to Margate via Canterbury West.

Additional services, including two trains per day to and from Maidstone West run to and from the station during the peak hours.

===== Olympic Javelin service =====
During the 2012 Summer Olympics in London, St Pancras was the Central London terminus of the Olympic Javelin service, a seven-minute shuttle between Central London and Stratford International station for the London Olympic Park.

=== International services ===
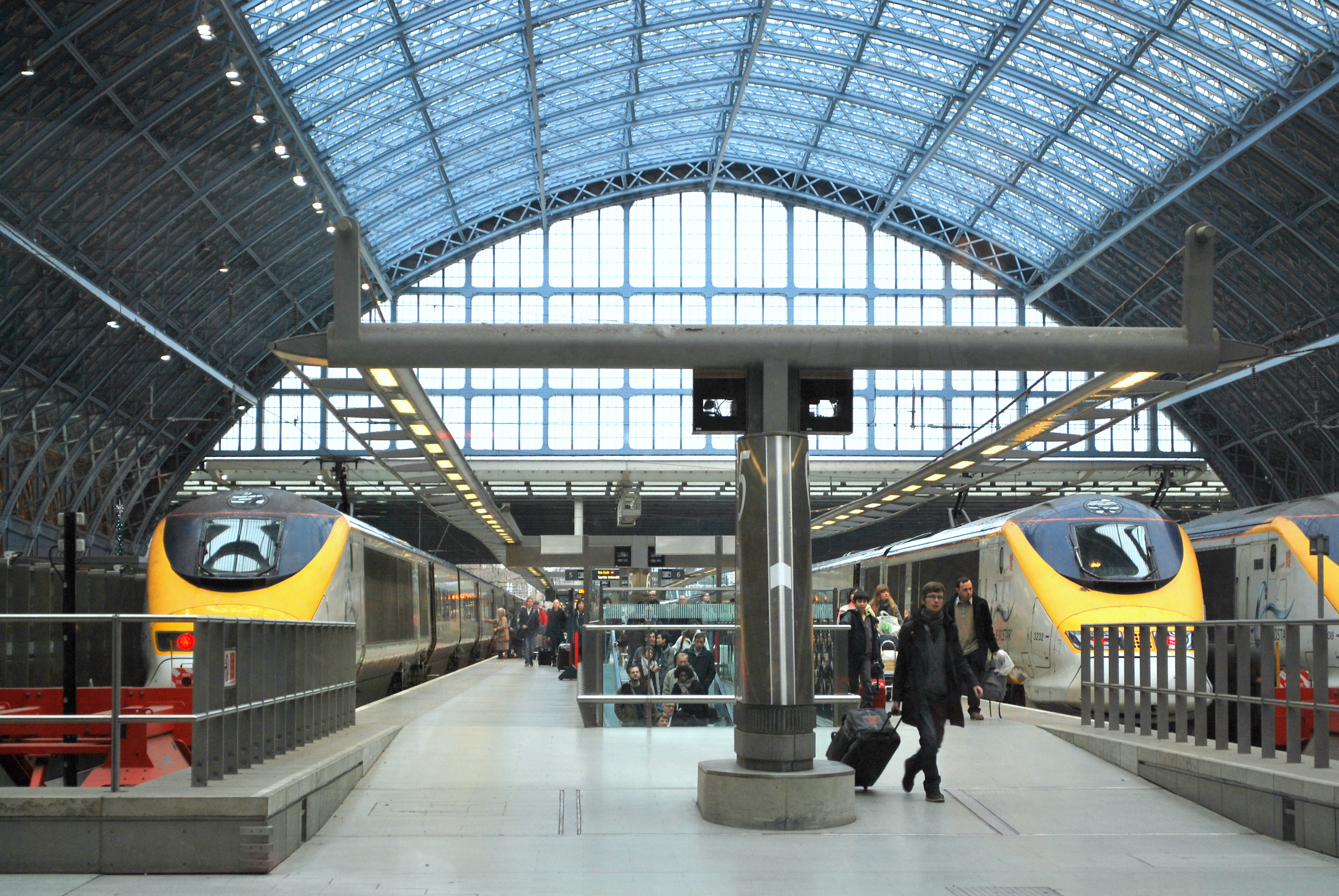
Eurostar train at St Pancras International

The following services stop at this station:

| Operator(s) | Route | Notes |
|---|---|---|
| Eurostar | London St Pancras – Lille–Europe – Brussels–Zuid | |
| Eurostar | London St Pancras – Lille–Europe – Brussels–Zuid – Rotterdam–Centraal – Amsterdam–Centraal | |
| Eurostar | London St Pancras – Paris–Nord | |

Passengers must clear passport control before boarding. In the past, leisure-oriented trains ran to the French Alps during the skiing season, but this is no longer operational and passengers need to change trains in Lille instead.

| Preceding station | National Rail | Following station |
|---|---|---|
| Terminus | East Midlands Railway; Midland Main Line | Leicester |
| Terminus | East Midlands Railway; Midland Main Line | Market Harborough |
| Terminus | East Midlands Railway; Midland Main Line | Kettering |
| Terminus | East Midlands Railway; Midland Main Line | Luton Airport Parkway (limited service) |
| Terminus | East Midlands Railway; Connect / Luton Airport Express | Luton Airport Parkway |
| Terminus | Southeastern; High Speed 1 | Stratford International |
| Farringdon | Thameslink; Thameslink | St Albans City |
| Farringdon | Thameslink; Thameslink | Kentish Town |
| Farringdon | Thameslink; Thameslink | West Hampstead Thameslink |
| Farringdon | Thameslink; Thameslink | Finsbury Park |
| | Eurostar | |
| Terminus | Eurostar | Lille-Europe (Note: With some former stops at Ebbsfleet International and Ashford International. Eurostar services to these stations were suspended on 31 March 2020 due to the COVID-19 pandemic, though as of 2022, Eurostar planned to return to these stations in 2025.) |
| | Historical railways | |
| Terminus | Midland Railway; Midland Main Line | Camden Road; Line open, station closed |
| Terminus | London Midland Region | Kentish Town; Line and station open |

== Creative arts ==
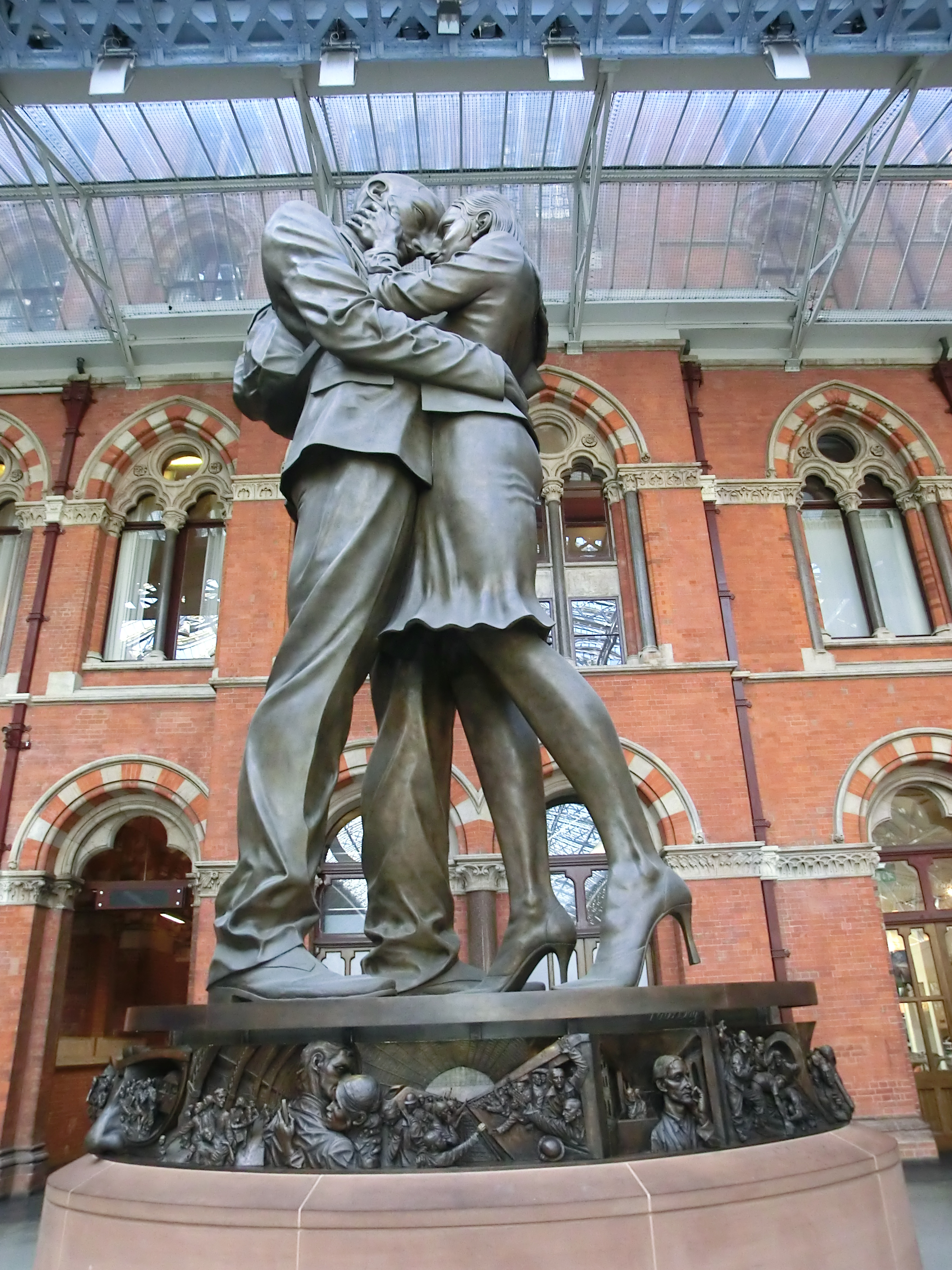
The Meeting Place sculpture at St Pancras

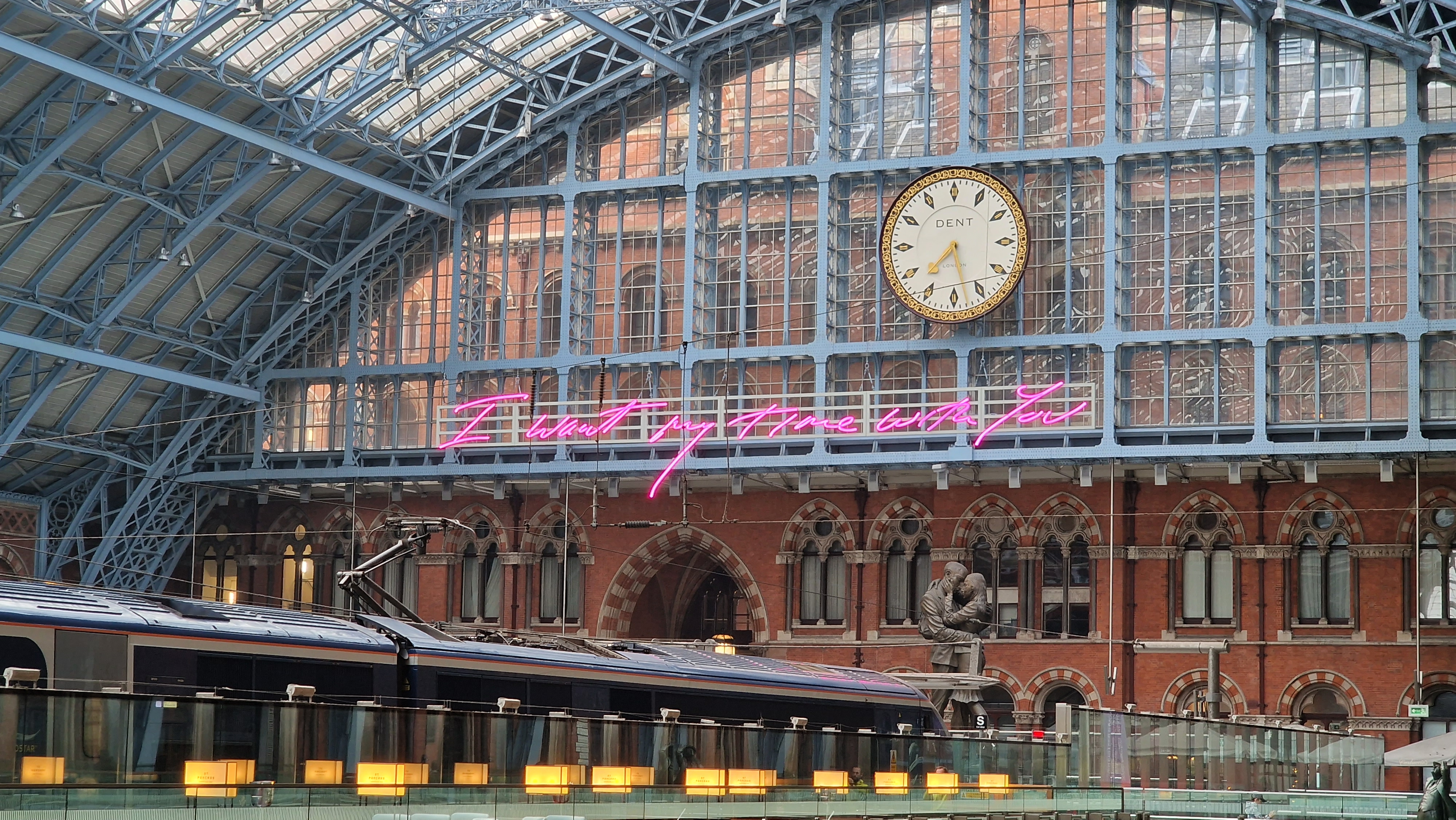
Interior view of Tracey Emin’s “I Want My Time With You” installation at St Pancras International

There are several works of art on public display at St Pancras. A 9-metre (29.5 ft) high 20-tonne (19.7-long-ton; 22.0-short-ton) bronze statue titled The Meeting Place stands at the south end of the upper level beneath the station clock. It was designed by the British artist Paul Day to evoke the romance of travel through the depiction of a couple locked in an amorous embrace. Controversy was caused by Day's 2008 addition of a bronze relief frieze around the plinth, depicting a commuter falling into the path of an Underground train driven by the Grim Reaper. Day revised the frieze before the final version was installed. Above this, there is a board suspended from the ceiling entitled "I want my time with you", designed by Tracey Emin.

On the upper level, above the Arcade concourse, stands a bronze statue of John Betjeman, depicted gazing in apparent wonder at the Barlow roof. A work of the British sculptor Martin Jennings, the statue commemorates Betjeman's part in a successful campaign to save the station from demolition in the 1960s.

There are a number of upright piano in the main St Pancras concourse that are available for anyone to play. In 2016, Elton John gave an impromptu performance here on a piano he subsequently donated to the station as a gift.

== Hotel ==
The hotel's façade.

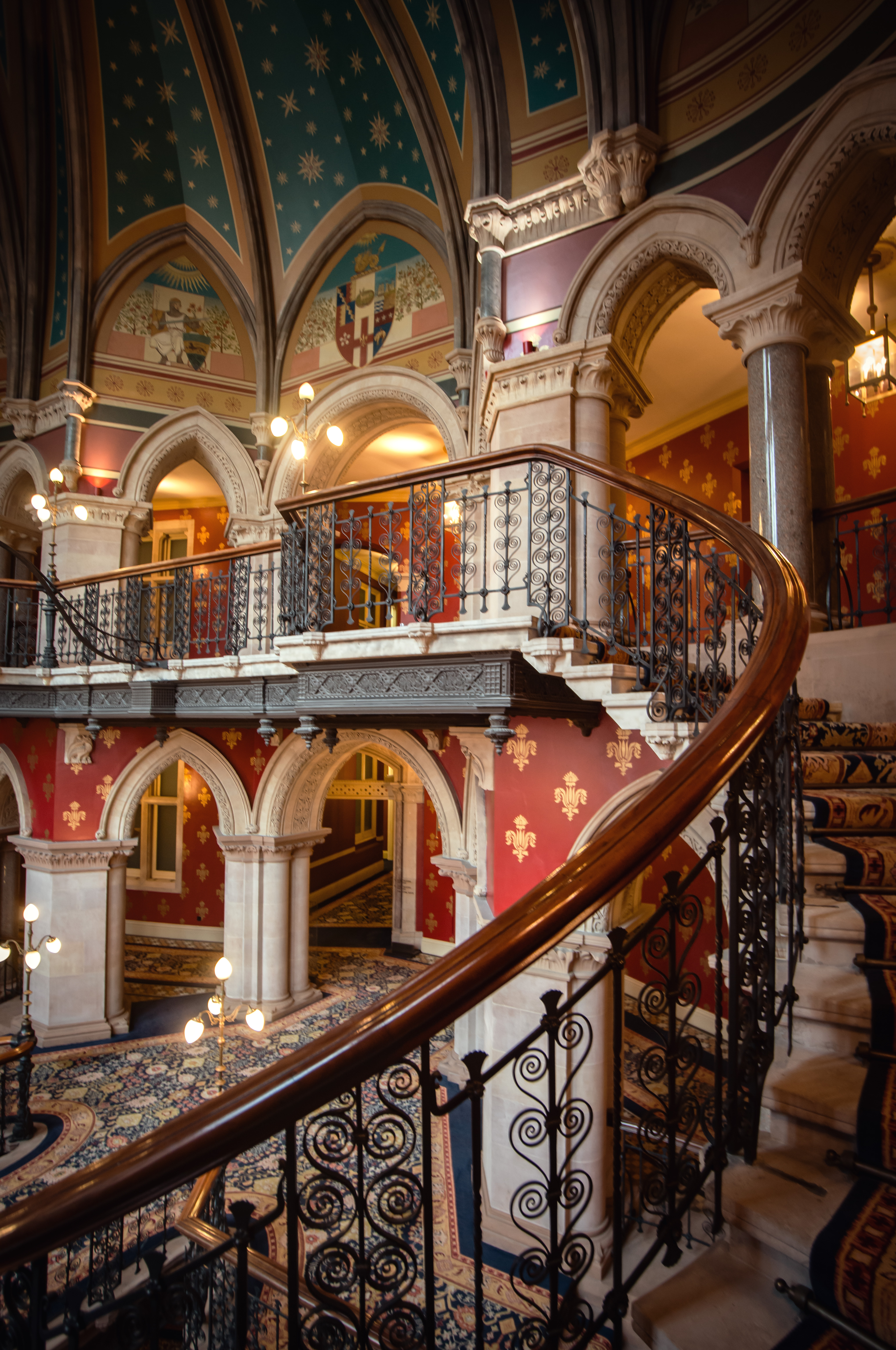
Gilbert Scott's Grand Staircase inside the St Pancras Hotel

In 1865, the Midland Railway Company held a competition for architects to design a hotel to front the station. George Gilbert Scott was persuaded to enter by his friend, Midland director Joseph Lewis, and completed the winning design at home while attending to his son who had fallen ill. Though plans were complete by the end of the year, financial pressure meant construction had to be delayed. Work eventually started in 1868 and the main section of the Midland Grand Hotel opened on 5 May 1873, with the west wing following three years later. The building is primarily brick, but polychromatic, in a style derived from the Italian gothic, and with numerous other architectural influences. (Note: Scott had previously submitted Gothic-inspired designs for the Foreign Office, but had had his designs blocked.) Gilbert Scott reused many of the design details from his earlier work at Kelham Hall designed in 1857 and completed in 1863, but on a much grander scale for St Pancras.

The hotel closed in 1935 and was turned into St Pancras Chambers, a group of offices, with ownership retained by the London, Midland and Scottish Railway (which was created when the Midland amalgamated with other railways). In the late 1980s, British Rail sold off and vacated the premises.

Following the decision to connect St Pancras to the Channel Tunnel Rail Link, plans were made to restore the hotel for its original function. Planning permission was granted in 2005 and funded as part of a £50 million Government plan to refurbish the station. The St Pancras London Hotel occupies parts of the original building, including the main public rooms, together with a new bedroom wing on the western side of the Barlow train shed. The upper levels of the original building have been redeveloped as apartments by the Manhattan Loft Corporation. The hotel held its grand opening on 5 May 2011, exactly 138 years after its original opening.

The hotel has been used as setting in several films, including Chaplin (1992), Richard III (1995) and From Hell (2001). It was used for the filming of the Spice Girls' 1996 video, "Wannabe".

== Accidents and incidents ==
On 17 February 1918, a German Gotha aircraft dropped five bombs, one of which destroyed the roof of the station's ornate booking hall and killed 20 people. The station was also bombed in World War II, including a parachute mine damaging the roof on 15–16 October 1940, and a bomb exploding in the beer vaults underneath platform 3 on 10–11 May 1941.

On 20 July 1959, a locomotive overran a signal and crashed into Dock Junction signal box; trains had to be hand-signalled in and out of St Pancras for several days.

== Future developments ==
=== Competition with Eurostar ===
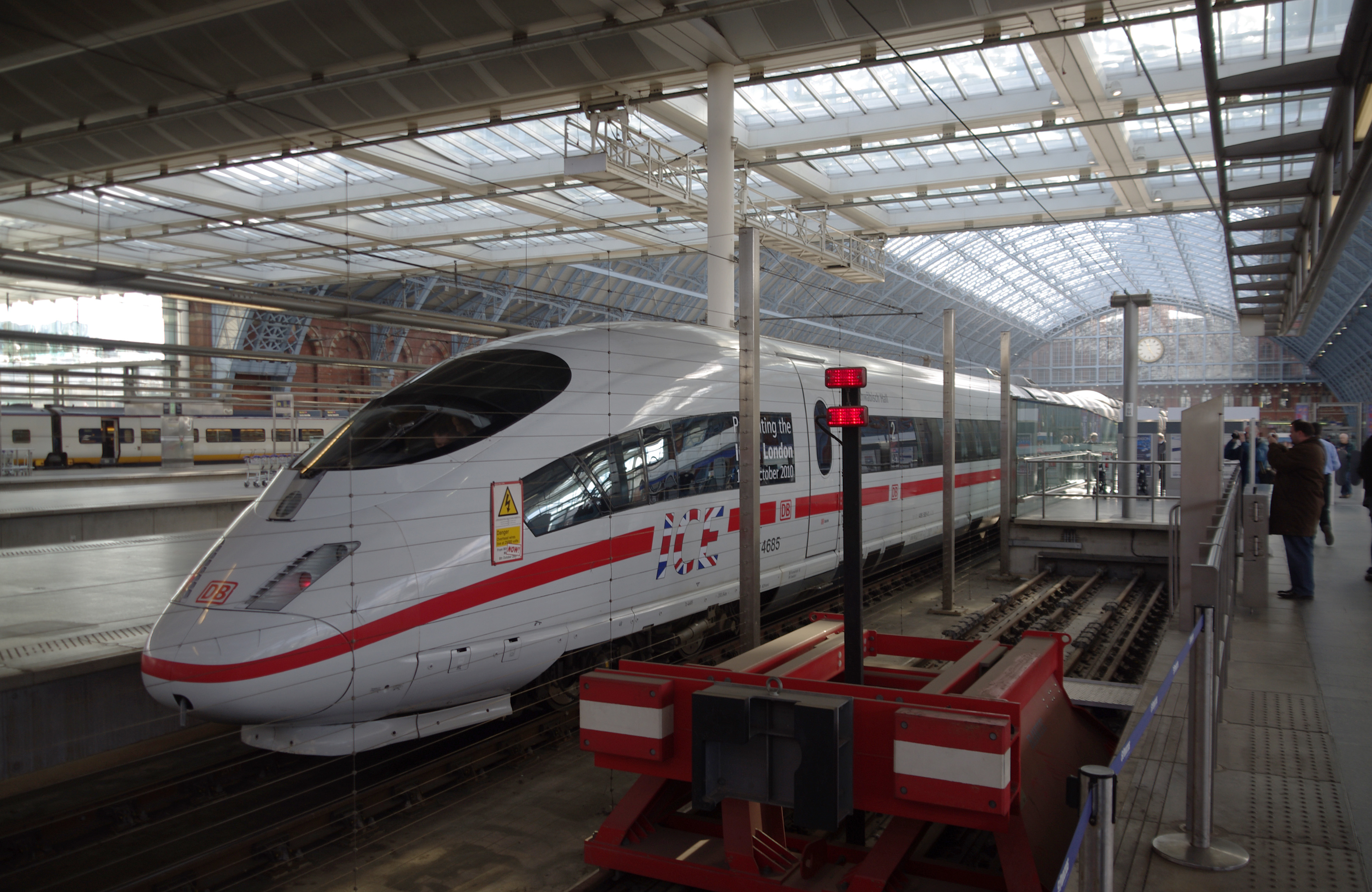
A Deutsche Bahn ICE 3 train at St Pancras in 2010

In January 2010, the European railway network was opened to liberalisation to allow greater competition. Both Air France-KLM and Deutsche Bahn expressed interest in taking advantage of the new laws to run new services via High Speed 1 to St Pancras.

In December 2009, Deutsche Bahn received permission to run trains through the Channel Tunnel after safety requirements were relaxed. It had previously expressed a desire to run through trains between London and Germany. Direct trains between St Pancras and Cologne could have started before the 2012 Olympics, with plans to run a regular service of three daily trains each direction to Frankfurt, Rotterdam and Amsterdam via Brussels in 2013. Deutsche Bahn trains would be made up of two coupled sets between London and Brussels, dividing at Bruxelles-Midi/Brussel-Zuid. DB showcased an ICE 3 trainset in St Pancras in October 2010. The start date for these services was not expected before 2018. In March 2017 it was announced that Deutsche Bahn had revived plans for a London to Frankfurt train service taking 5 hours, with the service beginning as early as 2020, though plans were later shelved.

In February 2010, the idea of a Transmanche Metro service gained support as local councillors in Kent and Pas-de-Calais announced that they were in talks to establish a high-frequency stopping service between London and Lille. Trains would start at Lille Europe and call at Calais, Ashford International and Stratford International before reaching St Pancras. Since High Speed 1 opened, Ashford and Calais have an infrequent service and Eurostar trains do not call at Stratford International. It was hoped the service would be running by 2012 in time for the London Olympics. The mayor of Calais revived these plans in 2016, and said it could be operational in five years.

In 2025, the Office of Rail and Road announced there was potential additional space at the Temple Mills rail depot to allow another rail franchise to run on the line, allowing competition with Eurostar. Potential competitors include Virgin Trains and Evolyn. Virgin's proposals involve running trains from St Pancras to Eurostar's existing destinations by 2030, with additional longer services towards Germany and Switzerland.
