= Edward John Dent =

English watchmaker (1790-1853)

Edward Dent
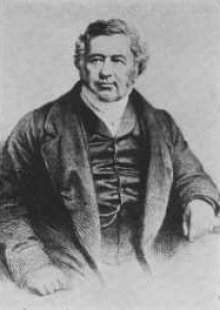
- Edward Dent
- Born: 19 August 1790; London
- Died: 8 March 1853 (aged 62); London
- Organization: E. Dent & Co.
- Known for: Founding E. Dent & Co.; the Great Clock of Westminster ("Big Ben")
- Engineering career
- Discipline: Clockmaker and watchmaker
- Significant advance: accurate clocks and marine chronometers

Edward Dent (1790–1853) was a famous English watchmaker noted for his highly accurate clocks and marine chronometers.

He founded the Dent company.

== Early years ==
Edward John Dent, son of John and Elizabeth Dent, was born in London on 19 August 1790. He was baptised on 18 October 1790, at St. Clement Danes Church in the Strand. Edward had a younger brother, William (born 11 February 1792). The boys' mother, Elizabeth, died while they were still young – she was buried on 16 May 1793.

== Interest in watchmaking ==
At the age of 14, Dent became apprenticed to his grandfather, John Wright Dent, a tallow chandler. Under the terms of the indenture – dated 20 August 1804 – John Wright Dent was expected to find suitable lodgings for his apprentice. Fortunately, Edward John Dent's cousin, Richard Rippon, was willing to have him. Rippon was an expert watchmaker and Dent became fascinated by watchmaking and less interested in the business of making and selling candles. Indeed, Dent became so interested in the watchmaking craft that, on 13 February 1807, his grandfather agreed to transfer the remaining years of the seven-year apprenticeship as a tallow chandler to Edward Gaudin, Watchmaker.

== 1814–1829: "The formative years" ==
In 1814, when Dent was just 24 years old, he was becoming well known as a watchmaker and clockmaker of some distinction: in this year he supplied a Standard Astronomical Clock for the Admiralty, and at least one pocket chronometer for the Colonial Office African Expedition. As early as 1814, Dent was making clocks and chronometers on his own account, but not in sufficient quantities to earn him a satisfactory livelihood.

During 1815–29, it is believed that Dent worked for a number of well known firms. One such firm was Callum Brothers of Castle Street, Long Acre in London. It is almost certain Richard Rippon had worked for them, and had introduced Dent to the firm.

In 1826 Dent submitted two chronometers, Nos. 54 and 55, for trial at Greenwich. This must indicate that he had made at least 55 chronometers by 1826. His submitting chronometers for trial brought him to the notice of the authorities at the Royal Observatory, Greenwich. Indeed, in 1828 Dent was employed by the Royal Observatory, Greenwich to examine and repair chronometers. His charges for repairing chronometers were as high as 25 guineas – an apparently exorbitant cost, but one that was nevertheless accepted.

In a letter to the Board of Ordnance, dated March, 1829, John Pond – at the time Astronomer Royal – described Dent as "among the best workmen of the present day." Dent's reputation for precision eventually brought requests from the Admiralty and the East India Company. His reputation was given another boost when, in August, 1829, Dent Marine Chronometer No. 114 won the First Premium Award at the Seventh Annual Trial of Chronometers. Dent took full advantage of his win, mentioning it wherever possible in his advertisements.

== 1830–1840: Arnold & Dent ==
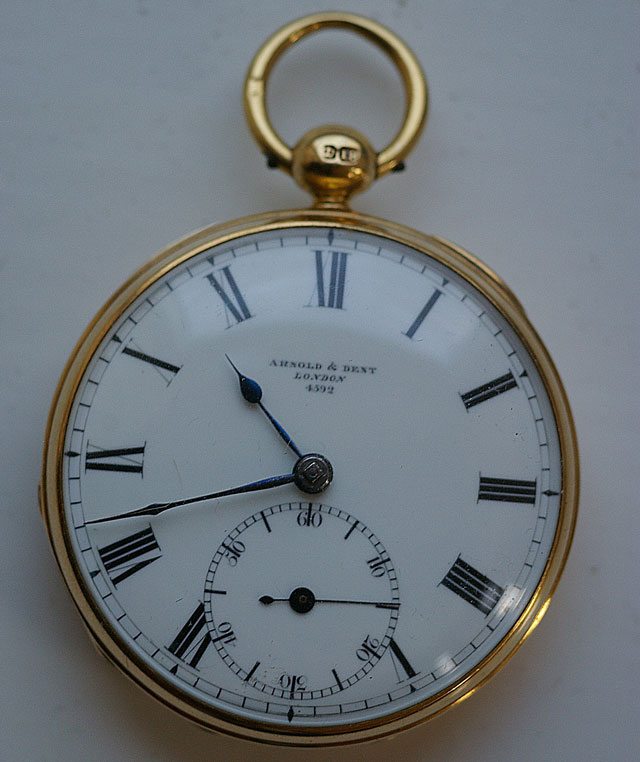
Pocket watch by Arnold and Dent hallmarked 1835

In 1830, Dent learned of an opening available for a skilled craftsman in the firm of John Roger Arnold of 84 Strand. But instead of becoming an employee of the firm, Dent became a partner. The partnership was signed on 30 September 1830. The partnership suited both men. Arnold, who was 61 at the time, could still have a say in the running of the business, and could now have time to spend on his hobby, which was inventing new mechanisms of all kinds. Dent, aged 40, was in a position to advertise his ability as a technician and to use his great business sense to put his firm on to a really sound footing.

To draw attention to the firm, now known as 'Arnold & Dent', Dent arranged advertisements in The Nautical Magazine. Dent also sent the results of their experiments to the editor so that they would be published in this magazine. One of the first notices – published in May, 1832 – read:

Messrs. Arnold and Dent have just completed another of those beautiful specimens of art, in the shape of a pocket chronometer, showing at once both mean time and sidereal time. This is the fourth of these machines that has been made.

In an article entitled Hints on Chronometers appearing in Nautical Magazine and dated February 1833, Dent reveals that chronometer No. 633 was sent with 21 other chronometers to Captain FitzRoy on board HMS Beagle in 1831. In fact, several of these chronometers were by Arnold and Dent. A naturalist on this, the second voyage of HMS Beagle, was Charles Darwin. Indeed, Darwin's observations on that voyage led to the publication of his ground-breaking book On the Origin of Species.

The last two years of the partnership between Arnold & Dent were unhappy ones. Dent's hopes of taking over the business were frustrated, and as a result, he became exasperated. Perhaps understandable when Dent possessed an almost fanatical determination to become the best chronometer maker in the world.

And so on 30 September 1840, the partnership of Arnold and Dent came to an end.

== Post 1840 ==
On 1 October 1840, the firm, known as E. J. Dent, London began its existence at 82 Strand.

On 21 March 1842, Dent applied for a Patent, to be entitled "Certain Improvements in Chronometers and other Timekeepers". This Patent covered various designs of compensation balance and the invention of a Remontoire for use in Marine chronometers.

In January 1843, Dent opened his second premises, at 33 Cockspur Street, just off Trafalgar Square. The shop displayed timepieces made by Breguet – whom Dent had met during his time with John Roger Arnold – as well the owner's creations.

In March 1843 production and sale of Dent's Dipleidoscope started (made to J. Bloxam's patent 9793 of 1843), and was to continue for some 25 years.

On 1 July 1843, Edward John Dent married Elizabeth Rippon – widowed when Richard Rippon died in 1835. Dent gained two stepsons (Frederick William and Richard Edward) and two-stepdaughters (Mary Elizabeth and Amelia Lydia Sophia).

Dent won the esteem of Sir George Airy, the Astronomer Royal, who recommended him as the maker of a large clock for the tower of the new Royal Exchange. Dent's tender was accepted and was announced in the Herald on 20 August 1843:

NEW ROYAL EXCHANGE

At the east end there is to be a Tower, one hundred and forty feet high, containing the Clock and Chimes which latter characteristic is to be revived. This Clock is to be the best specimen that can be produced of modern skill in clock-making, and is intended to furhish the Merchants and Captains with the most accurate record of time in the City of London. It is to be made by Mr. Dent, the Clock and Chronometer Maker, under the direction of the Astronomer Royal, Professor Airy. The Peal of Bells will consist of nine Bells. The tenor will weight one ton, and the others in proportion. These Bells are now being cast by Mr. Mears, who cast the Monster Bell for Canada.

Dent established a workshop in Somerset Wharf, Strand, to produce this excellent timepiece, which was installed in 1844.

In 1852 Dent won the commission to make the great clock—now popularly called Big Ben—for the Houses of Parliament at Westminster, but he died before completing the project. Edward John Dent died on 8 March 1853, at the age of 62 and his adopted son completed the Great Clock.

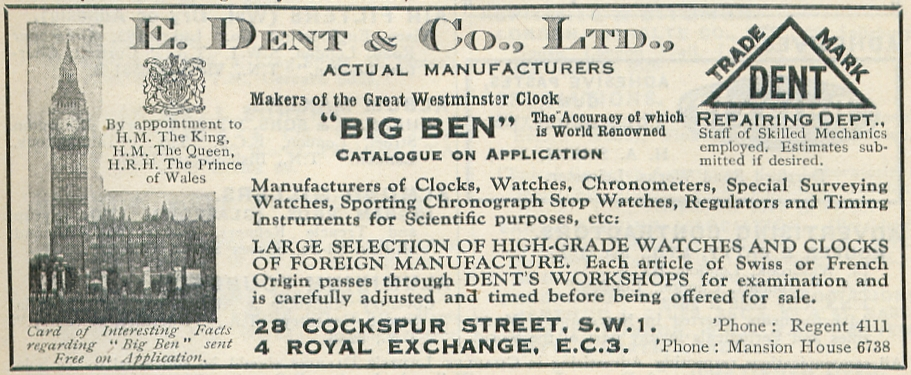
A 1931 advertisement by E. Dent & Co. Ltd.

== The Dent company ==
Following Dent’s death in 1853, the firm traded as E. Dent & Co. under his successors, continuing to supply chronometers and standard clocks to observatories and public bodies through the later nineteenth century; examples of Dent’s work are held in UK national collections.

In 1876 the company instituted a triangular trade mark to deter imitation; period pieces frequently bear the word “DENT” within a triangle device.

The firm held royal patronage in the Victorian era (inscriptions such as “Chronometer/Watchmaker to the Queen” appear on instruments), and its regulators were used in time distribution. In 1924 the BBC’s new Greenwich Time Signal (“six pips”) was originated from the Royal Observatory using Dent regulator no. 2016 before later replacement by a Shortt master clock.

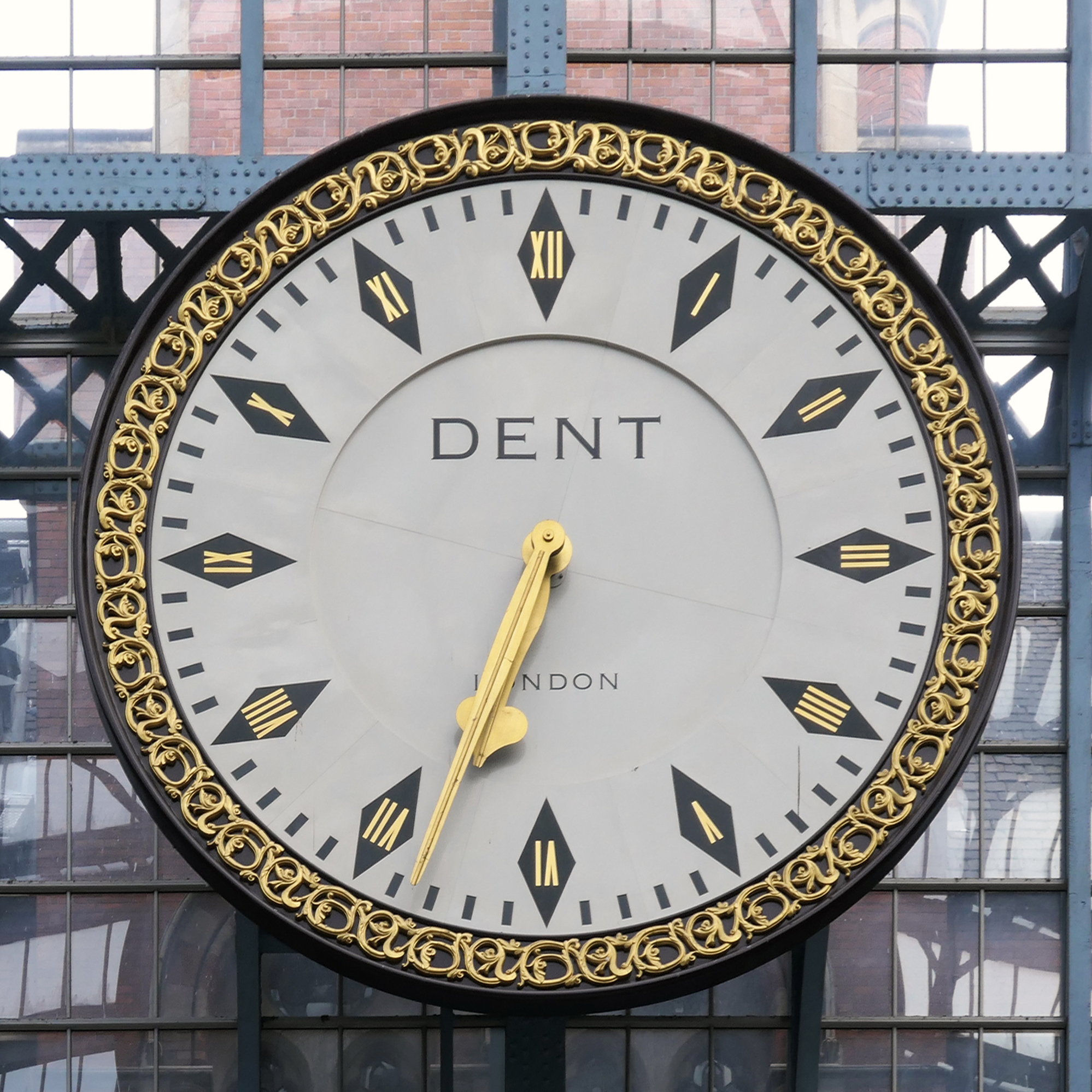
- Dent clock, St Pancras station The Dent Clock at St Pancras International Railway Station

In the twenty-first century, companies trading under the Dent name have produced new public clocks. During the restoration of St Pancras International in 2007, a platform clock with an 18 feet (5.5 m) dial was installed at the south end of the trainshed, produced by Dent in partnership with Smith of Derby; contemporary coverage noted that fragments of a Victorian dial reassembled by railwayman Roland Hoggard were used as reference.
