= Iraq and Afghanistan Memorial =

War memorial in London

- United Kingdom
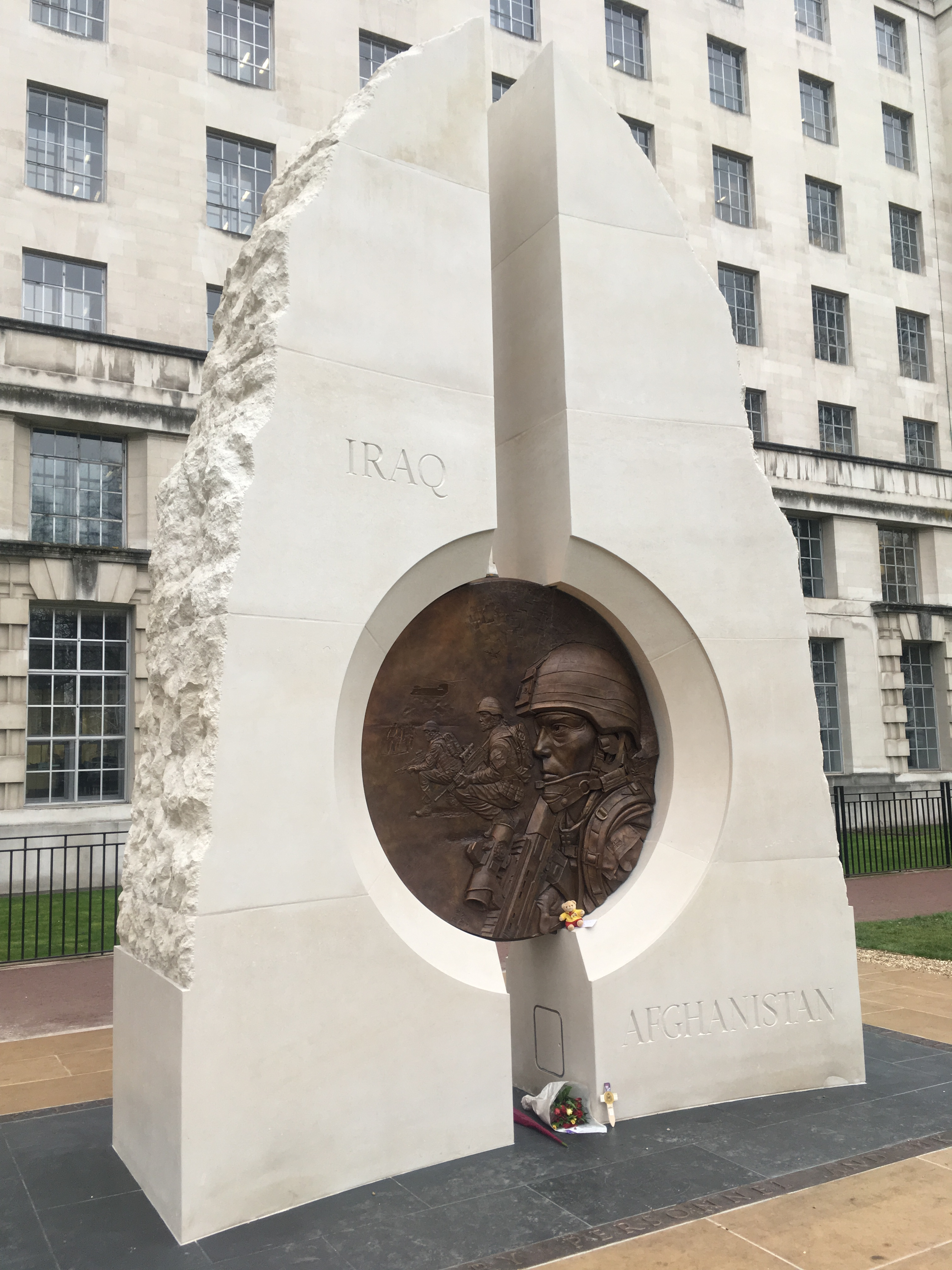
- For: Gulf War; Afghanistan War; Iraq War
- Unveiled: 9 March 2017
- Location: 51.5034°N 0.1243°W; Victoria Embankment Gardens, City of Westminster, London, England
- Designed by: Paul Day

The Iraq and Afghanistan Memorial in London commemorates British citizens, including both military personnel and civilians, who participated in the Gulf War, the Afghanistan War and the Iraq War. In these three conflicts, which took place between 1990 and 2015, 682 British service personnel died. A work by the sculptor Paul Day, the memorial is situated in Victoria Embankment Gardens, between the River Thames and the headquarters of the Ministry of Defence, in the vicinity of monuments commemorating the Second World War and the Korean War.

== Description ==
The memorial was designed by Paul Day. It consists of two large Portland stone monoliths, weighing 33 tonnes (32 long tons; 36 short tons). On one side, one stone is inscribed "Afghanistan" and the other "Iraq", and on the other side one bears the word "duty" and the other "service". A side of each stone is left in a rough condition as a reference to the rocky terrain of Afghanistan and Iraq. The stones are separated by a narrow gap and support between them a thick bronze medallion or tondo sculpted with reliefs that echo the memorial's theme of "duty and service", depicting members of the armed forces on one side and civilian workers on the other.

Unlike similar monuments the memorial carries no names, "to be inclusive of all those who contributed", and commemorates all who served, civilian and military, not only casualties.

== Manufacture ==
The monument was manufactured by stoneCIRCLE, a stonemason based in Basingstoke. It consists of 10 Jordans Basebed Portland Stone blocks, the largest of which weighs 7000 kg each. The blocks were rough cut and then dry built round a stainless steel frame to allow the edges to be pitched by hand to match the artist's requirements. Once completed they were dismantled and taken to Victoria Embankment Gardens to be reassembled.

== Background and fundraising ==
On Remembrance Sunday 2014, it was announced that Lord Stirrup, the former Chief of the Defence Staff, would lead the efforts to raise one million pounds to enable a national memorial to the British service personnel who fought in Iraq and Afghanistan to be erected in central London. By March 2015 Stirrup was confident that the full amount needed could be raised and by July 2016 work had begun on the memorial in the Victoria Embankment Gardens.

== Unveiling ==
The memorial was unveiled on 9 March 2017 by Queen Elizabeth II in the presence of the Duke of Edinburgh, the Prince of Wales and Duchess of Cornwall, the Duke and Duchess of Cambridge, Prince Harry, the Prime Minister Theresa May and her predecessors John Major, Tony Blair and David Cameron, as well as the Defence Secretary, Michael Fallon. The unveiling ceremony was preceded by a drumhead service at Horse Guards Parade led by the Chaplain of the Fleet, the Venerable Ian Wheatley. The ceremony was criticised by some relatives of those who died, because they were not invited, and for the presence of Blair, who led Britain into the Iraq War.
