= The Meeting Place (sculpture) =

Sculpture by Paul Day

Coordinates: 51°31′49″N 0°07′31″W

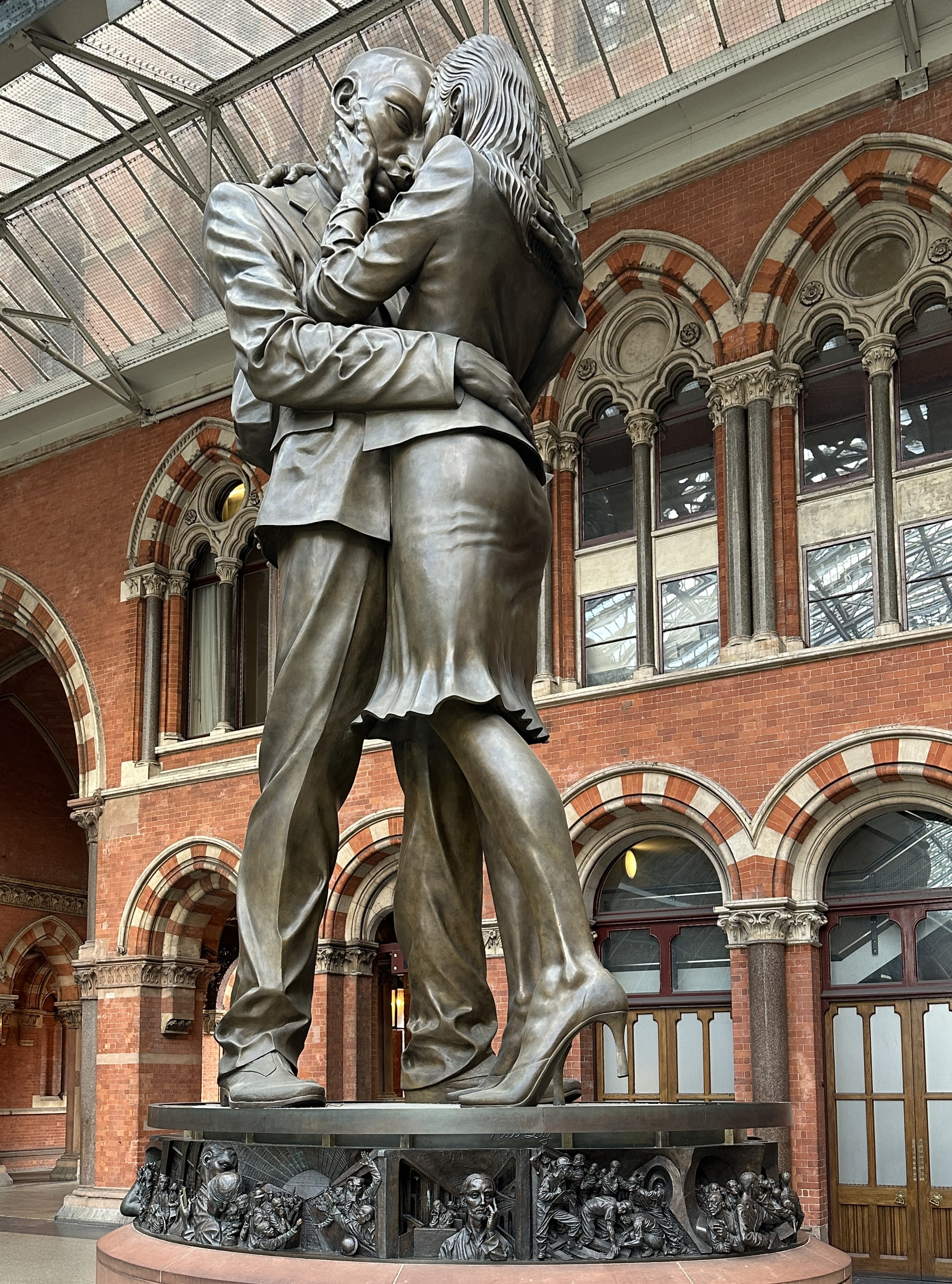
The Meeting Place in situ at St Pancras Station, London

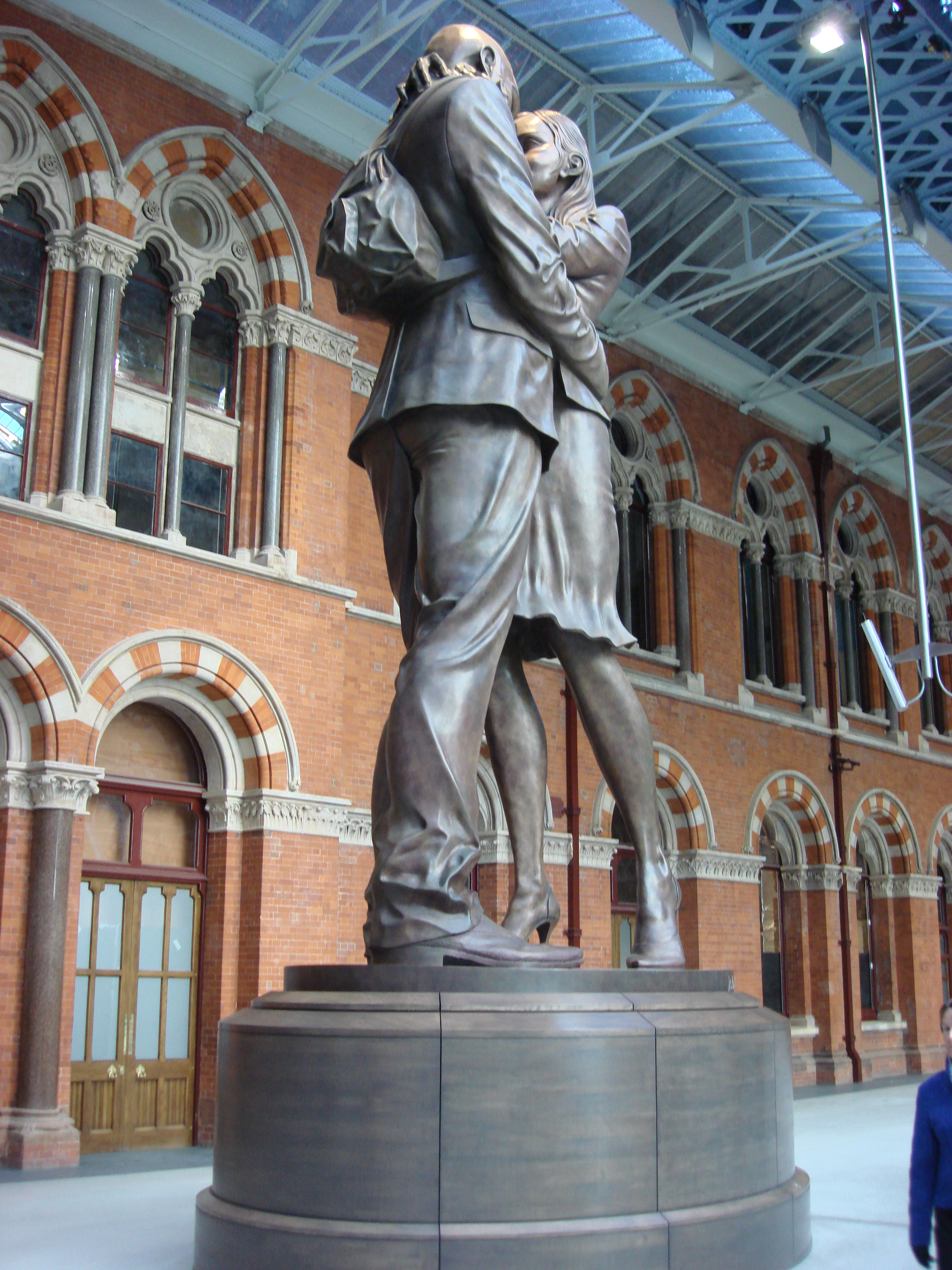
The Meeting Place before the 2008 addition of a bronze relief frieze

The Meeting Place is a 9-metre-high (30 ft), 20-tonne (20-long-ton) bronze sculpture that stands at the south end of the upper level of St Pancras railway station. Designed by the British artist Paul Day and unveiled in November 2007, it is intended to evoke the romance of travel through the depiction of a couple locked in an amorous embrace.

The statue, which stands in the Eurostar terminal, is reported to have cost £1 million and was installed as the centrepiece of the refurbished station. The work, commissioned by London and Continental Railways, is modelled on the sculptor and his wife.

== Critical response ==
The sculpture received a poor critical reception, being cited by Antony Gormley as "a very good example of the crap out there", comparing it to other examples of public art in the UK, and later referred to as a "terrible, schmaltzy, sentimental piece of kitsch" by Tim Marlow of the Royal Academy of Arts. Jeremy Deller dismissed it as "barely a work of art". Day commented that "[a] lot of people will no doubt detest it because it is not violent or controversial".

Further controversy was caused by Day's 2008 planned addition of a bronze relief frieze around the plinth. Originally depicting a commuter falling into the path of an Underground train driven by the Grim Reaper, Day believed the piece to be a "tragi-comic style and was supposed to be a metaphor for the way people’s imaginations ran wild" but revised the frieze before the final version was installed.

Despite harsh criticism from major figures in the British art world, the statue has become popular with the public and contributed to its perception of St Pancras. In 2011, an edition of "The World’s Most Romantic Spots" by Lonely Planet described the station as one of the most romantic meeting places in the world, citing the statue as a key reason.
