= Dent (watchmaker) =

Former London manufacturer of luxury clocks and watches

Dent London was a London manufacturer of luxury clocks and watches, founded by Edward John Dent. Dent began making watches in 1814, although the Dent triangular trade mark was not registered until 1876. A notable success for the company was winning the contract to make the clock for the new palace of Westminster, which became known as Big Ben.

== Chronometers ==
Edward John Dent (1790–1853) discovered his passion for horology from his cousin, Richard Rippon, himself a master watchmaker. Dent established his own company in 1814, and developed a reputation as a builder of accurate chronometers. One of his chronometers won the First Premium Award in the 1829 Greenwich Trials. The Royal Navy equipped themselves with Dent's chronometers.

Dent's chronometers accompanied some of the 19th century's most influential explorers. Robert FitzRoy took Dent chronometer no. 633 aboard HMS Beagle in 1831 on the voyage that eventually led to the publication of On the Origin of Species – outlining Charles Darwin's revolutionary theory of evolution.

Two decades later, David Livingstone purchased Dent chronometer no. 1800 for his African explorations. And in 1890, the explorer Henry Morton Stanley was moved to write to Dent that "the Chronometers supplied by you, and which were taken across Africa in my last Expedition, proved a very great service to me and were in every way thoroughly satisfactory and reliable".

== Standard clocks ==
Dent constructed the first Standard Astronomical Clock for the Admiralty in 1814, and went on to supply Standard Clocks throughout the 19th century to Switzerland, Italy, Spain, Belgium, Russia, USA and Japan.

In 1871, Dent was given the honour of making the Standard Clock at the Royal Observatory, Greenwich. Dent also built the Observatory's secondary Standard Clock, responsible for sending the signal for the emission of the 6 BBC pips, first broadcast in 1924.

== Royalty ==
Dent earned a Royal Warrant as the official watch and clockmaker to Queen Victoria and Albert Prince of Wales in 1841 – a warrant that would be renewed through to George V's reign. Russian emperors Tsar Alexander III and Tsar Nicholas II, and the Japanese Emperor Mejii also issued Dent with royal warrants.

== Public clocks ==
Dent constructed a turret clock for the Great Exhibition of 1851. The clock won a Council Medal, and was moved from The Crystal Palace and erected at King's Cross Station but was replaced with an electronic bell and clock system in the mid 20th century.

It was also Dent who built the mechanism for the 1907 clock placed on a clock tower upon Jaffa Gate in Jerusalem. It was showing both the European and the local ''alaturka'' time, on two faces each. The clock tower was demolished for aesthetic reasons in 1922 (although some believe it was rather meant as a measure to push forward the Westernisation of Palestine, starting with timekeeping) and the clock installed that same year in a new, modern nearby clock tower, which was itself demolished in 1934.

== Big Ben ==
E. Dent & Co. advertising postcard

Leading horologists like Edward John Dent were keen to compete for the honour of making this most important of clocks. Therefore, in 1846, the Commissioner decided to open it to limited competition.

On 25 February 1852 the contract for constructing Big Ben's clock was awarded to Dent by Sir George Airy, the Astronomer Royal. For the sum of £1,800 (equivalent to £217,300 in 2025), Edward John Dent was to construct the clock according to Edmund Beckett Denison's design. Edward John Dent died in 1853 and it was left to his son, Frederick Dent, to complete the job.

== Modern revival ==
After a period of dormancy in the late 20th century, Dent London was revived and is now operated under the legal entity E. J. Dent & Co. Ltd, based in London, United Kingdom.
