= Ship's chronometer from HMS Beagle =

Marine chronometer
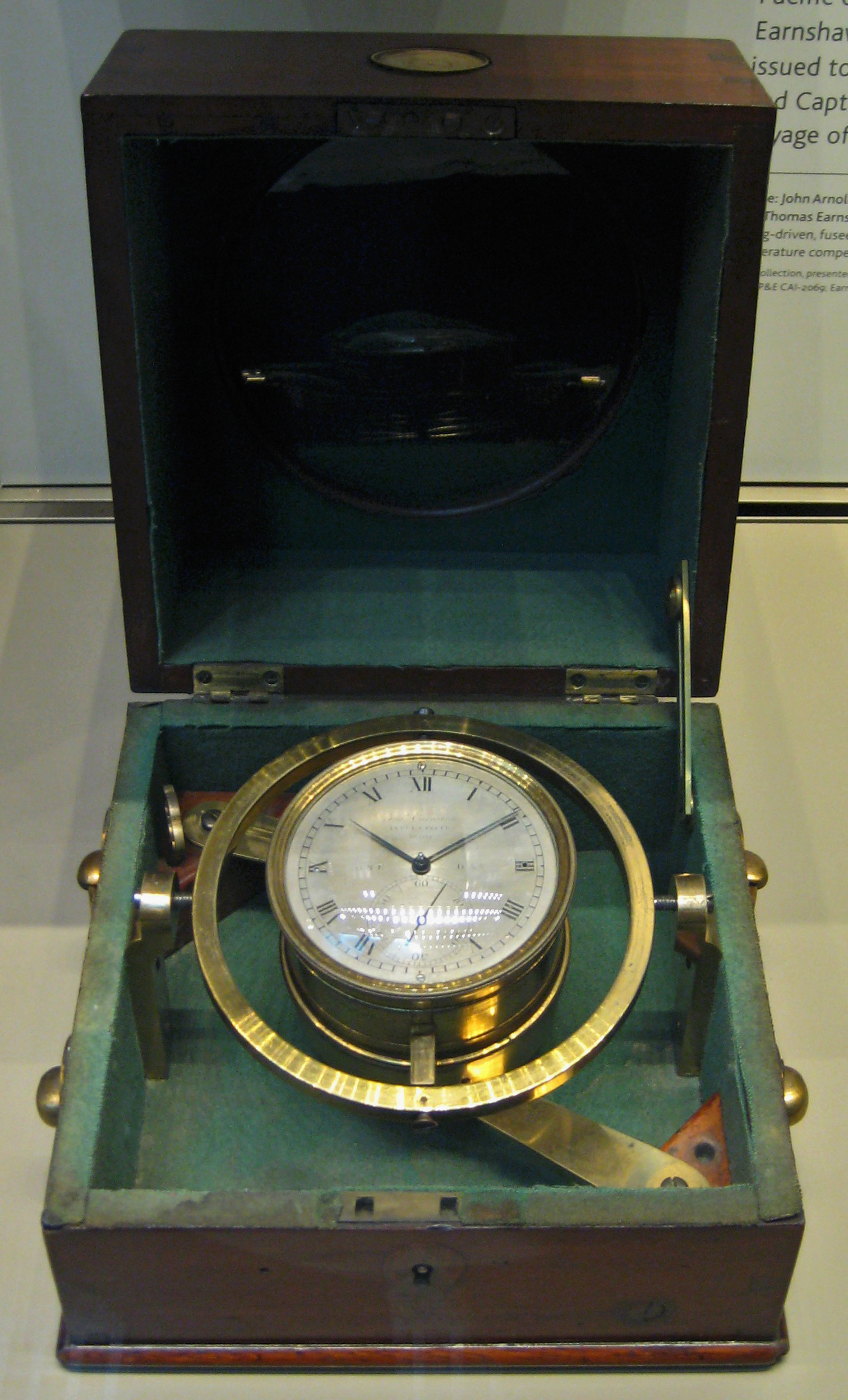
- The nautical chronometer from HMS Beagle.
- Material: steel, mahogany, brass
- Created: 1795–1805, London (119 High Holborn)
- Present location: Room 39, British Museum, London
- Identification: CAI.1957, L210
- Registration: 1958,1006.1957

A nautical chronometer made by Thomas Earnshaw (1749–1828), and once part of the equipment of HMS Beagle, the ship that carried Charles Darwin on his voyage around the world, is held in the British Museum. The chronometer was the subject of one episode of the BBC's series A History of the World in 100 Objects.

Meticulous naval inventories show that HMS Beagle carried a total of at least 34 recorded chronometers on its three main survey voyages from 1826 to 1843, and 22 on the second voyage with Darwin on board, when they had a dedicated cabin. Some were Navy property and others were on loan from the manufacturers, as well as six on the second voyage owned by the captain, Robert FitzRoy. Both of the two known survivors from the second voyage are owned by the British Museum (the second is registration No. CAI.1743).

== Background ==
Nautical chronometers were of great importance in the 18th and 19th centuries as aids to navigation. Accurate measurement of time was needed for the determination of longitude. Earnshaw was not the first to make such chronometers, but he was one of the first to make them cheaply enough that they started to become essential equipment for a ship at sea. By the time the Beagle set sail, it was being reported in The Nautical Magazine that the price of chronometers was dropping rapidly while the same quality was being maintained. Earnshaw’s chronometer had a novel escapement mechanism, the spring detent escapement, and a bimetallic strip for temperature compensation so that it would continue to maintain accuracy in all climates around the world.

=== Beagle's chronometers ===
The Beagle was sent in 1831 on a survey mission which involved circumnavigating the globe, a journey which lasted until 1836 and described by the naturalist on board the ship, Charles Darwin, in his book The Voyage of the Beagle. It was on this journey that Darwin began forming the ideas published much later as On the Origin of Species. The Beagle carried twenty-two chronometers, an unusually large number, but necessary to ensure accuracy of the survey. Three would have been commonplace on ships of the time, as this is the minimum number required to easily identify one that has gone faulty. The Admiralty started a general issue of chronometers to H.M. Ships from 1825, but between about 1800 and 1840 availability could not keep up with demand. The Admiralty therefore only issued one chronometer to each ship unless the Captain personally owned one. In those cases the Admiralty would issue another to take the total to three, reasoning that a ship with two was no better off than with one since a faulty instrument could not be identified.

The Beagle however, would be gone for several years and was required to take chronometers ashore and in boat expeditions up rivers to determine the coordinates of specific reference points as instructed by the Admiralty. It could not be guaranteed that any one chronometer would continue to function accurately, or even survive the journey at all. Each chronometer was mounted on gimbals to keep it level in all sea conditions, and the whole assembly fixed inside a hinged wooden box for protection. For additional protection, they were stored in sawdust in a special cabin in the Captain's quarters. Only crew who needed to take measurements, or who maintained them, were allowed access, measures which indicate the importance attached to these instruments. The Beagle voyage succeeded, for the first time, in establishing a linked chain of reference points around the globe of known longitude which could be used by subsequent voyages to calibrate their own chronometers.

=== Maintenance and accuracy ===
The chronometers were maintained by an instrument maker, one George James Stebbing, whose salary was paid for personally by the captain of the vessel, Robert FitzRoy. FitzRoy considered the post to be essential to the mission but the Admiralty had refused to pay for it. FitzRoy bore the cost himself, as he did for much of the ship's equipment, but the Admiralty did concede that Stebbing could be fed from the ship's rations. This concession was not extended to Darwin, who paid £500 for his own keep.

By using his chronometers to measure the time of local noon when he returned to his home port Fitzroy was able to measure the overall accuracy of the entire voyage. As he sailed west, local noon occurred progressively later, until finally, when he had circumnavigated the globe, the shift in local noon time, as measured by his chronometers should be exactly twenty-four hours. In fact, Fitzroy's measurements exceeded this by 33 seconds, which is equivalent to just 8.25 nautical miles (15.28 km). This was impressive for a journey of tens of thousands of miles over five years; nevertheless Fitzroy considered the error to be inexplicably large.

== History ==
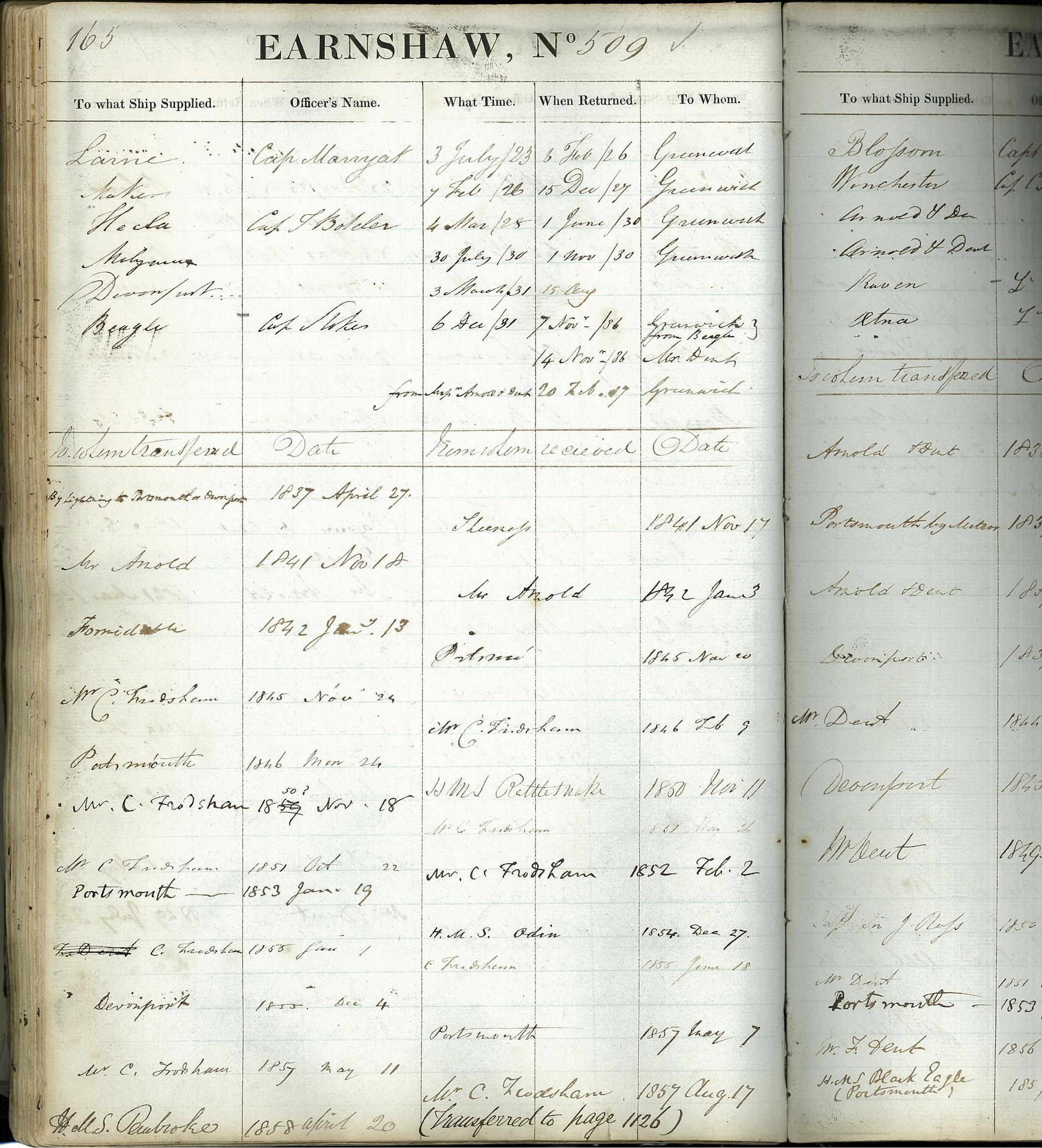
Page from the Royal Observatory, Greenwich’s ledger for Earnshaw chronometer no. 509

Thomas Earnshaw's Marine Chronometer No. 509 was manufactured around 1800 and served on a number of Royal Navy ships. William Edward Parry while exploring Baffin Bay in July 1819 during his first attempt to find the Northwest Passage mentions that Earnshaw's chronometer had been used in 1818 to determine the longitude of a spot to within 1' 30" of his own measurement. He does not, however, say which ship it was on board. At this early time, all Royal Navy purchased chronometers were issued by the Greenwich Observatory who also checked their rates and sent them out for cleaning between voyages. Initially, Greenwich issued chronometers directly to ships, but later, as chronometers became more common, they were sent from Greenwich to other Royal Navy ports and dockyards for issue locally. The first recorded issue from Greenwich was 3 July 1823 to Captain Frederick Marryat in command of HMS Larne. Larne took part in the First Anglo-Burmese War which lasted from 1824 to 1826.

The chronometer was returned to Greenwich 6 February 1826 and then sent to its makers for servicing. It did not come back to Greenwich for nearly two years. On 4 March 1828 it was issued to Captain J. Bolder in command of HMS Hecla. At this time Hecla was a famous ship: under the command of George Francis Lyon she had been part of Parry's second expedition to find the Northwest Passage. Over 6,000 members of the public visited the ship at Deptford while she waited to set out on Parry's third expedition in 1824. The attempt ended in 1825 after the leading ship, HMS Fury was abandoned due to ice damage. Parry used Hecla again in an 1827 attempt to reach the North Pole. Parry unwillingly gave up Hecla when the admiralty sent her to survey the West African coast under the command of Bolder. In July 1830 the chronometer was returned from Hecla and went for cleaning to the watchmaker Robert Molyneux in London. It was returned to Greenwich in November but not immediately issued to another ship.

=== Portsmouth and Devonport ===
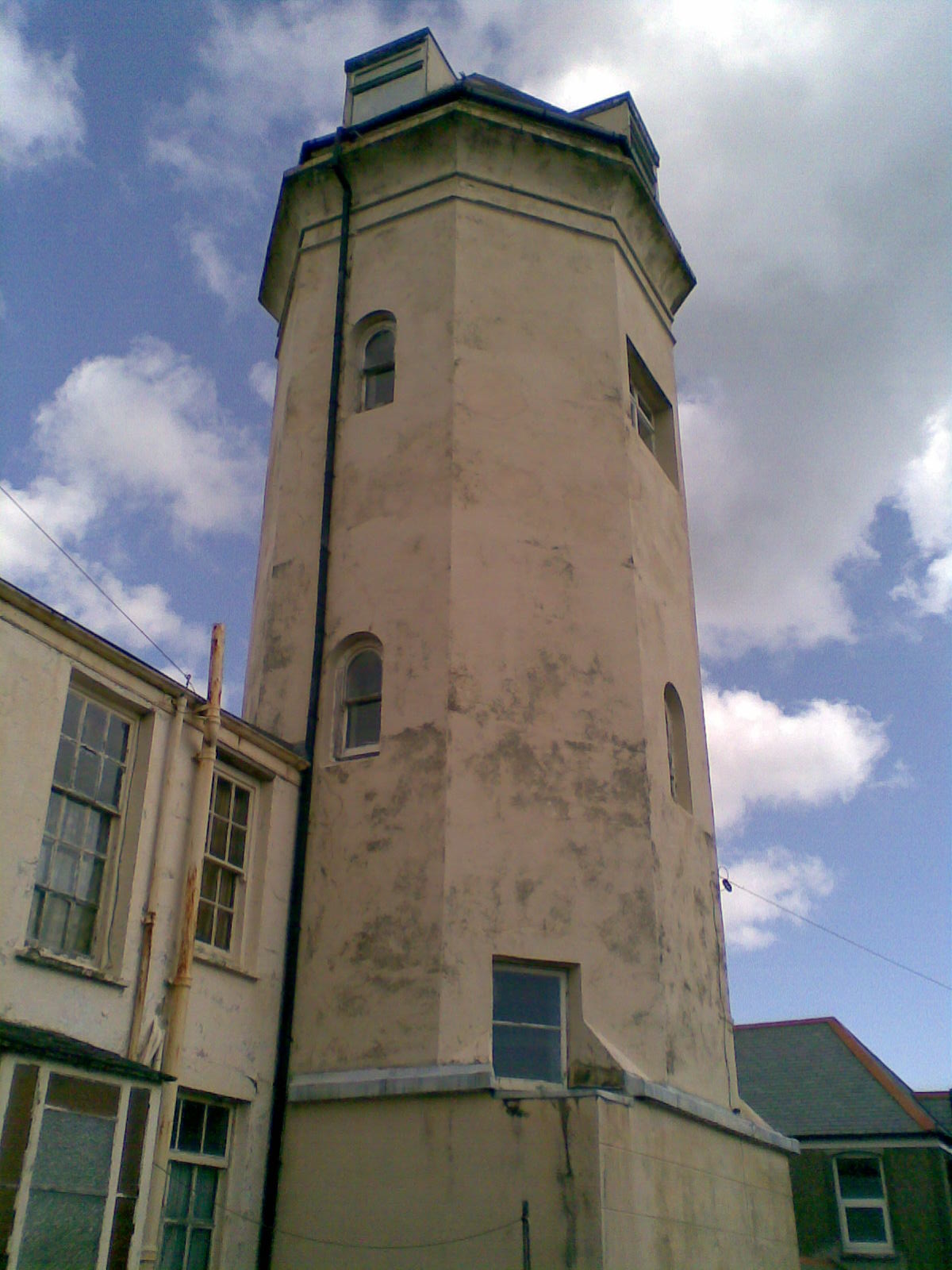
Falmouth Observatory

In March 1831, the chronometer was delivered to Devonport, where the rate was checked and recorded. On 6 December 1831, it was issued to Captain Stokes in command of HMS Beagle. It sailed with Captain Fitzroy on Beagle's famous second voyage and was returned to Greenwich on 7 November 1836. After a period at Arnold and Dent for cleaning, it was transported by HMS Lightning to Devonport or Portsmouth for issue to ships there.

It was returned to Greenwich on 17 November 1841, and after another service by Arnold and Dent was issued to HMS Formidable on 13 January 1842. It stayed with Formidable until 20 November 1845, when it was returned to Greenwich. It was then serviced by Charles Frodsham and sent for issue to ships at Portsmouth. It was transported back to Greenwich periodically by Royal Navy ships for service by Frodsham (HMS Rattlesnake 11 March 1850, HMS Odin 27 December 1854) and finally returned from Portsmouth 7 May 1857. The final ship to be issued the chronometer was HMS Pembroke, which received it on 20 April 1858. Pembroke returned the chronometer to Greenwich on 1 February 1867.

=== Use on shore ===
After serving on Pembroke the chronometer stayed with Frodsham for over six months. Greenwich issued it to the Meteorological Committee of the Royal Society on 25 November 1867. The Meteorological Committee used the chronometer for observations at Falmouth Observatory. It was returned to Greenwich on 3 November 1886 and sent to J Poole for servicing 22 November 1886. Poole returned the chronometer on 13 December 1886 declaring it to be beyond economic repair. It was given to E. Dent & Co. on 16 July 1888 in part exchange for the chronometer Dent 43107. It was later acquired by the private collector Courtenay Adrian Ilbert. After his death in 1956, Ilbert's collection was put up for auction in 1958. The auction was cancelled, however, and the collection purchased by the British Museum following a private donation of funds.

== BBC Programme ==
The chronometer was object 91 in the BBC Radio 4 series A History of the World in 100 Objects, first broadcast 11 October 2010. The series was made in collaboration with the British Museum and was presented by Neil MacGregor, the Director of the British Museum. The specialist contributors to the chronometer episode were Nigel Thrift, the vice-chancellor of the University of Warwick, and Steve Jones, geneticist and television presenter. The programme discussed the search for longitude, the role chronometers played in this, Earnshaw's contributions to chronometer design, the voyage of the Beagle, and the importance of the chronometers she carried.

== See also ==
- List of chronometers on HMS Beagle

== Bibliography ==
- "Ship's chronometer from HMS Beagle", The British Museum, retrieved 8 June 2010, archived 1 October 2010.
- "Marine chronometer", British Museum database, object ID 1958,1006.1957, retrieved 1 January 2012, archived 1 January 2012.
- "Ship's chronometer from HMS Beagle", A History of the World, BBC, retrieved 8 June 2010, archived 1 October 2010.
- "Earnshaw No. 509", Ledger of Receipts and Issues of Chronometers, pp. 165, 1126, Greenwich Observatory.
- The Nautical Magazine, vol. 2, Brown, Son and Ferguson, 1833.
- Frome, Edward Charles, Outline of the method of conducting a trigonometrical survey, for the formation of geographical and topographical maps and plans: military reconnaissance, levelling, etc., J. Weale, 1850.
- King, Philip Parker; Darwin, Charles; Fitzroy, Robert, Narrative of the Surveying Voyages of His Majesty's Ships Adventure and Beagle, Between the Years 1826 and 1836 Appendix to Volume 2, p. 345, London: H. Colburn, 1839.
- Macdonald, Fiona, Inside the Beagle with Charles Darwin, Salariya Publishers, 2005 ISBN 1-904642-92-6.
- Mercer, Vaudrey, "The life and letters of Edward John Dent, chronometer maker, and some of his successors", Antiquarian Horological Society monograph, no.13, Antiquarian Horological Society, 1977
- Nicholas, F.W.; Nicholas, Janice Mary, Charles Darwin in Australia, Cambridge University Press, 2002 ISBN 0-521-01702-5.
- Parry, William Edward, Journey of a Voyage for the Discovery of a North-West Passage from the Atlantic to the Pacific, London: John Murray, 1821.
- Sobel, Dava; Andrewes, William J.H., The Illustrated Longitude, Fourth Estate, 1998 ISBN 1-85702-714-0.
- Taylor, James, The Voyage of the Beagle: Darwin's Extraordinary Adventure in Fitzroy's Famous Survey Ship, Anova Books, 2008 ISBN 1-84486-066-3.
This article is about an item held in the British Museum. The object reference is 1958, 1006.1957.

Preceded by 90: Jade bi with poem	A History of the World in 100 Objects; Object 91	Succeeded by 92: Early Victorian tea set
