= Courtenay Adrian Ilbert =

English civil engineer and horologist

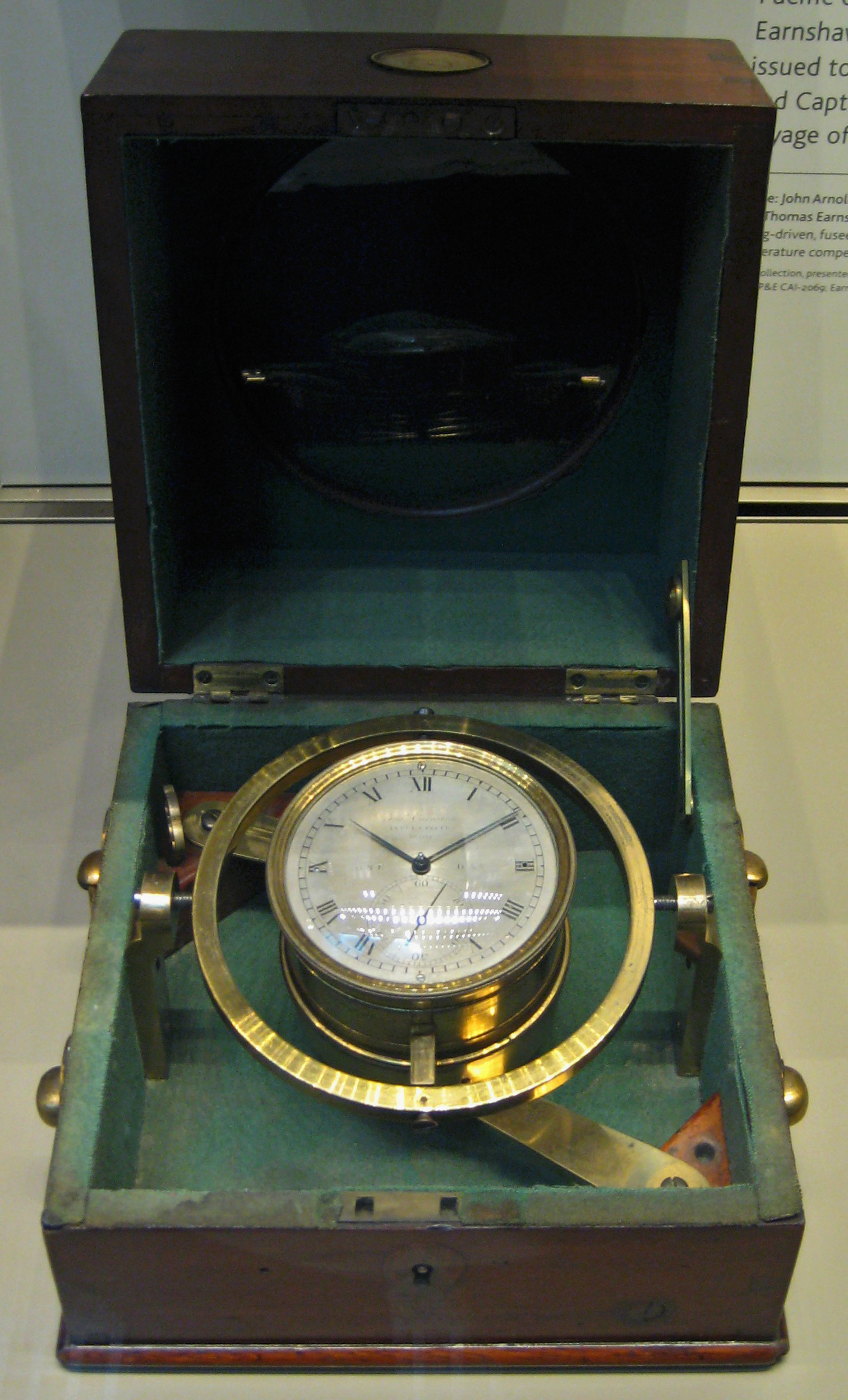
Ship's chronometer from HMS Beagle

Courtenay Adrian Ilbert (1888–1956), was a British civil engineer interested in horology, and a collector of watches. Ilbert lived for a time at 10 Milner Street, Chelsea, London, the old ground floor drawing room once housed the Ilbert Collection of clocks, watches, marine chronometers and sundials. He brought together the most important collection of watches ever achieved by a private collector. In 1958, after his death, his collection was acquired by the British Museum. Initially, the collection had been put up for auction, but was saved for the public by a private donation to the British Museum for this purpose and the auction was subsequently cancelled. The collection, now known as the Ilbert collection, includes the Earnshaw 509 chronometer, one of only three surviving out of a complement of 22 from the Second voyage of HMS Beagle, which famously took Charles Darwin around the world.
