= Cardinal Newman Catholic School, Hove =

Cardinal Newman Catholic School

Location
- The Upper Drive; Hove, East Sussex, BN3 6ND; England; 50°50′13″N 0°09′28″W

Information
- Type: Voluntary aided school
- Motto: "God is love, and he who lives in love lives in God, and God lives in him" (1 John 4:16)
- Religious affiliation: Roman Catholic
- Established: 1872
- Local authority: Brighton and Hove
- Department for Education URN: 114611 Tables
- Ofsted: Reports
- Principal: Claire Jarman
- Staff: 272 (2020–2021)
- Gender: Coeducational
- Age: 11 to 18
- Enrolment: 2452
- Colours: Year 7-Maroon Year 8-Dark Green; Year 9-Pale Blue; Year 10-Grey; Year 11-Navy Blue; Football Team-Green & White Rugby Team-Red & Black
- Website: http://www.cncs.co.uk/

Cardinal Newman Catholic School is an 11–18 voluntary aided comprehensive school located in Hove, East Sussex, England. It is a Catholic mixed comprehensive; established to serve the many parishes that lie on the coastal band between Newhaven and Seaford in the east and Shoreham in the west.

== The School's name ==
The school takes its name from John Henry Newman (1801–1890) a prominent Anglican who converted to Roman Catholicism and became a cardinal. He came to Brighton in 1826 as head of the family following his father's death to find a suitable home for his mother and sisters. When Pope Benedict XVI came to Britain in 2010, he proclaimed Newman as blessed, one step short of being a saint. John Henry Newman became England's first saint in over 300 years when he was canonised on Sunday 13 October 2019 in Rome.

== History ==
=== 19th c. early history ===
Madeleine Sophie Barat -‘RSCJ’ (1779–1865), founded of the Society of the Sacred Heart in 1800, in the wake of the French Revolution (1789–1799) to provide educational opportunities for girls. Her efficient schools became well known throughout the Christian world. Members use the suffix "RSCJ" which represents Religieuses du Sacré-Cœur de Jésus. It has a presence in 41 countries. The Society came to England in 1842, founding a girl's boarding school at Elm Grove in Roehampton. She was beatified in 1908 and canonised by Pope Pius XI in 1925 – her feast day is 25 May.
In the late 19th century the French Republic Government, brought in crippling taxes on all Orders of Convents and Monasteries, forcing the Society of the Sacred Heart to take their educational establishments world-wide. The nuns were granted permission by the Bishop to set up their convent and school on the south coast of England.

=== 1872: Convent of the Sacred Heart School Hove ===
A greenfield site in Hove was chosen secure from the bustle of the city. Originally part of the Stanford Estate and in the 1870s leased out to Edward King who used it as a market garden. Building work started in 1870 and the convent of the Sacred Heart and school were opened in 1872. The nuns themselves supervised the building work and were responsible for the landscaping the site, and the planting of the trees that adorn the school today.

The chapel foundation stone was laid in March 1879. It has been described as light and airy, with a high vaulted ceiling, with oak flooring and panelling. The Stations of the Cross are rather fine and were carved by a pupil of Eric Gill a Brighton born sculptor and typeface designer. They were donated in memory of ten-year old Cristina Buoncore, a boarder at the convent, who died in July 1958. There are three stained-glass windows – the Virgin and Child on the left of the chancel, and St Mary Magdalena Sophia Barat on the right, while in the nave there is a depiction of the Good Shepherd clad in ruby-red clothes. The chapel centrepiece is the altar, with six large brass candlesticks embellished at the base with an image of the Sacred Heart. It was created in marble, recessed at the front with eight pillars of different-coloured marbles. Behind these a carving of a vine with leaves, tendrils, and bunches of grapes. The carved reredos containing eleven saintly figures, Stations of the Cross including St Mary Madeleine Sophie Barat.

The nuns ran a fee-paying school for girls from wealthy families. The school had an excellent reputation, and one of the pupils was Princess Marie Louise, (1872–1956) granddaughter of Queen Victoria. The successful film director Herbert Wilcox (1890–1977), was another pupil. The convent also provided an education for poor children. Provided in a building that became known as the Bishop's House with 28 children.
In 1901 a new wing was added to the school to accommodate another convent from Beauvais in Northern France.

=== 1914: The First World War and after ===
In 1914 the Mother Superior placed the convent at the disposal of the Red Cross and around 100 military nurses lodged there. These nurses were employed at the 2nd Eastern Military Hospital, which had been set up in the Brighton, Hove and Sussex Grammar School (abolished in 1975, now Bhasvic), and on another site at the Portland Road Schools – there were further branches in Brighton. The nurses were ferried back and forth to the convent every day.
During the 1920s there were around 70 pupils, and the girls wore a peculiar three-cornered serge hat.

=== 1939: The Second World War and after ===
In 1939 the girls of the convent school were evacuated to Lutwyche Hall The 16th century hall once the home of Thomas Lutwyche at Easthope Shropshire. Although the elementary school remained in place. As part of the war effort the school ‘adopted’ the Tribal-Class destroyer HMS Afridi (F07), lost in the Norway Campaign Sunk 3 May 1940 by Ju 87 Stuka dive bombers, with a loss of 53 of the ships company, including 12 soldiers from Åndalsnes and Namsos she had embarked earlier.
By 1950 there were 250 girls at the school. Their uniform of green coats and gold berets was a familiar sight in Hove, and the blazer carried a colourful badge depicting the Sacred Heart.

The nuns eventually left Hove in 1966, and the girls who boarded at the convent school went to Tunbridge Wells Beechwood Sacred Heart School, or Woldingham Woldingham School. The nuns returned to the Mother House at Roehampton.

The site and buildings were acquired by the Diocese and the De La Salle Brothers took over the running of the school a Xaverian college for 420 boys, they had recently occupied Thomas Attree's villa in Queens Park (1909–1966). They became known as the De La Salle School until they moved out in 1971.

=== 1971: The move to Comprehensive schooling ===
Comprehensive schools were introduced to England and Wales in 1965, by the Labour government.
The Diocese of Arundel and Brighton purchased the convent and its grounds for £225,000, Bishop of Arundel and Brighton David Cashman (1912–1971) one time Chaplain to the Duke of Norfolk, was the guiding force behind the establishment of the first Catholic Comprehensive School in Sussex.
In 1971, the school was the amalgamation of De La Salle, an independent Grammar School, Cottesmore Secondary Modern School, Lourdes Convent, Blessed Sacrament Convent, and eventually the Fitzherbert school all became part of the new Cardinal Newman Catholic School. Its first headmaster was Anthony Smith, a plaque in the chapel celebrated the first ten years of the school's inauguration.

In February 2015, Cardinal Newman's new sixth form centre, Newman College, was opened by Cardinal Cormac Murphy-O'Connor (1932–2017). It provides classrooms, a lecture theatre, a library, a common room and offices. In 2018, 78% of A-level students achieved A*-C grades which is the highest of any school sixth form in Brighton and Hove.

== Faculty ==
- School Principal: Claire Jarman
- Head of college: Paul Miller
- Ofsted rating: currently rated as 'Outstanding' (October 2024 Ofsted Report)
- List of 140 + Teaching Staff: (2019)

=== Headteachers ===
- Anthony (Tony) Smith (1971–1981)
- Ian Feely (1981–1994) Article: 'Ian Feely, Teach what he preaches', 11 October 1996
- Peter Evans (1994–2007) Article: 'Headteacher to retire on a high note', 28 November 2007 The Argus
- Malvina Sanders (2007–2011) Retired due to ill health
- James Kilmartin (2011–2021) Retired
- Claire Jarman (2021– present)

== Notable pupils ==
- Princess Marie Louise of Schleswig-Holstein (1872–1956) granddaughter of Queen Victoria
- Herbert Wilcox (1890–1977) film producer and director
- Jacqueline Ann Duncan (1931–) educator, founder of the Inchbald School of Design
- Conor Maynard (1992–) pop star and YouTuber
- Charlie Grice (1993–) middle-distance runner
- Grant Hall (1991–) footballer
- Joe Gatting (1987–) footballer and cricketer
- Josh Poysden (1991–) cricketer
- Ryan Moore (1983–) flat racing jockey
- Ann Quin (1936–1973) novelist
- Bly Twomey (2010–) Paralympics table tennis medallist

== Sports ==
In 2019 Newman Rugby Academy enjoyed a successful season winning the National AoC Final at Moseley, Birmingham. In the final they played against Myerscough College Lancashire who they beat 40-5 crowning them National Champions.

== Sources ==
- Middleton, Judy, Hove in the Past, Convent of the Sacred Heart, Hove, 2003 (revised 2019)
- National Archives: Hove, Convent of the Sacred Heart School (1956–60)
- Convent of the Sacred Heart (HOVE), British Publishing Company, 1938 – Catholic schools – 28 pages
- Middleton, Judith, A History of Women's Lives in Hove and Portslade, (reference to Sacred Heart Convent) Pen & Sword Book, 2018 ISBN 978 1 52671 712 2
