= Milner Street =

Street in Chelsea, London

Coordinates: 51°29′40.89″N 0°9′45.67″W

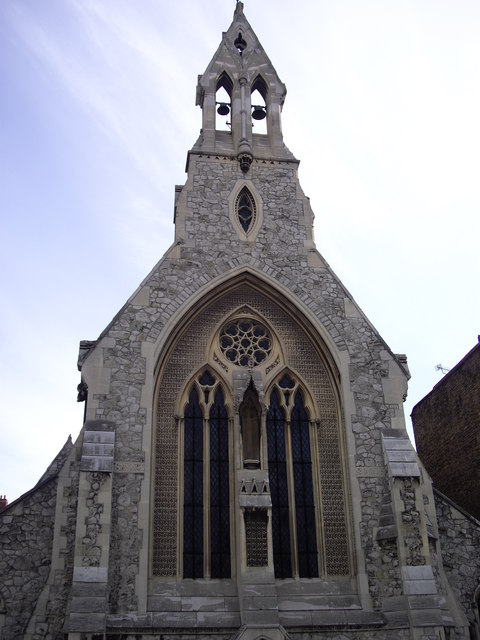
St Simon Zelotes, Milner Street (2009)

Milner Street is a street in Chelsea, London, England. It runs roughly west from Cadogan Square, crossing Ovington Street, Lennox Gardens, and Clabon Mews.

St Simon Zelotes is a grade II listed church in Milner Street, built in 1858–59, designed by the architect Joseph Peacock, and is his "most complete surviving work".

Other notable buildings include 10 Milner Street, sometimes known as Stanley House a grade II listed house built by the Chelsea speculator John Todd in 1855, for his own occupation. It was later home to Sir Courtenay Ilbert. From 1945, his nephew, the interior designer Michael Inchbald lived there, and continued to do so after Ibert's death. It has been grade II listed since 1969.
