= List of chronometers on HMS Beagle =

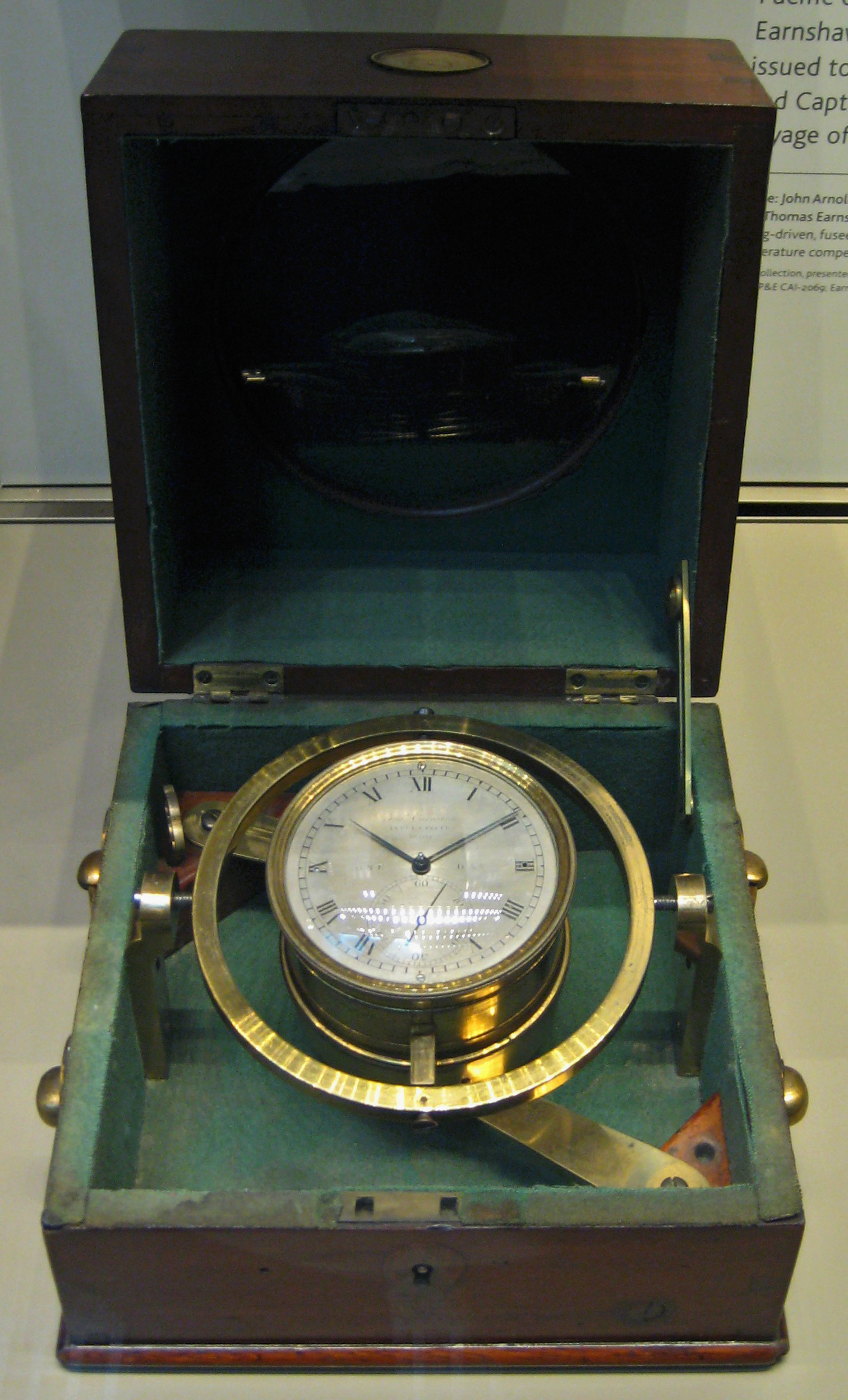
Chronometer made by Thomas Earnshaw, from Beagle's second voyage

Chronometers were formerly used for the accurate determination of longitude by ships at sea. By measuring the time of local solar noon compared to the time of noon at a reference point, the difference in longitude can be directly found. For this system to work, a timepiece showing the time at the reference point must be carried to the measuring point. A timepiece intended to remain accurate while subjected to the motions of a ship at sea and through extreme changes in environment, especially temperature, is called a chronometer. These were first built in the 18th century and were used extensively by mariners in the 19th century and into the 20th century, even after the widespread use of radio for time signals – the time signal was used to set the chronometer, but the instrument was still necessary to display the time.

HMS Beagle was an Admiralty survey ship sent on three major expeditions. The first (1826–1830) was to survey the coast of South America in company with HMS Adventure. The second expedition (1831–1836) was to build on the work of the first in South America and then to go onward to establish a chain of linked reference points encircling the globe. The third expedition (1837–1843) surveyed the coast of Australia.

A chronometer was first carried on a survey ship by James Cook on his second voyage in 1772. This was Larcum Kendall's K1, a copy of John Harrison's H4, the first practical chronometer. From 1818 the Admiralty began issuing chronometers to naval ships. From 1825, this became standard and ships were issued a second chronometer if the captain personally provided a third. Three chronometers was the minimum necessary to be able to identify whether one had become unacceptably inaccurate. By the time of the Beagle voyages, the use of marine chronometers had become routine and the ship carried a large number – an unprecedented 22 on the second voyage. This had become possible because the price of chronometers had decreased steadily as manufacturing increased. H4 had cost over £20,000 (inflation adjusted £3,370,000) to develop. Kendall's K1 cost £500 (now £79,000) and his cheap model, K3, cost £100 (now £13,000), but by the time the Beagle voyages were over the cost of a good chronometer had fallen to under £40 (now £4,400).

Beagle required large numbers of chronometers because some would inevitably break down on long voyages and the chronometers were essential for the mission of the ship. Further, the rates of all chronometers vary with time. Although this can be allowed for by interpolating between the regular rate checks, there is no guarantee that the changes are linear, and often they are not. Averaging the readings from a large number of chronometers, especially if they are of a variety of types, will tend to cancel out such errors.

To reach all points designated by the Admiralty for longitude measurements, it was sometimes necessary to take chronometers ashore, across inlets and up rivers too shallow for the ship. This put the chronometers at risk and the disturbance of moving them affected their accuracy. This was another reason for survey ships to carry a large number – most of them could be kept permanently in a safe, well-cushioned place on the main vessel.

== Chronometer makers ==
Some details of the chronometer makers referred to in the lists below are given in this table. With few exceptions, they were London-based makers.

Chronometer makers
Maker	Details
Arnold	John Arnold (1736–1799) was the leading chronometer maker of his time. He opened his business in The Strand in 1763, and later went into partnership with his son, John Roger Arnold (1769–1843), forming the company Arnold & Son.
Arnold & Dent	This was the successor company to Arnold & Son and was formed by a partnership between John Roger Arnold and Edward John Dent. The partnership lasted from 1830 to 1840. Dent then continued in business in his own right. Arnold & Son was acquired by Charles Frodsham after Arnold's death in 1843.
Dent	Edward John Dent (1790–1853). After the end of the partnership with Arnold, Dent formed a business which was continued by his stepsons. This business ultimately became E. Dent & Co. and continued trading until 1976. Dent is perhaps best known as the designer of the Big Ben clock, which was finished by one of his stepsons.
Earnshaw	Thomas Earnshaw (1749–1829). An important figure in the history of chronometers, Earnshaw invented the spring detent escapement which later became the standard arrangement for all chronometers. He also made improvements to the temperature compensation of balance wheels.
Eiffe	John Sweetman Eiffe (d.1880). Until his death, Eiffe held a grudge against the Admiralty for their failure to give him a reward for his invention of an auxiliary temperature compensation, which was independently discovered and patented by Molyneux while the Admiralty was still examining Eiffe's version.
French	Santiago James Moore French, or sometimes just James Moore French, was active from 1808 to 1842. He was a London chronometer maker operating at the Royal Exchange, later at Cornhill. French won a minor prize from the Board of Longitude for his chronometers and his no. 720 was the standard (that is, considered the best to which the others are compared) for 16 chronometers used to determine the accurate longitude of Madeira in 1822.
Frodsham	Charles Frodsham (1810–1871) was a clockmaker and chronometer maker with premises initially in Finsbury Pavement and then New Bond Street. He purchased the business of John Roger Arnold on Arnold's death in 1843 and was then based at the premises of Arnold's business in The Strand under the name of Arnold & Frodsham. He was granted a Royal Warrant in 1854 and reverted the name to Charles Frodsham & Co. in 1858. Charles Frodsham & Co. Ltd. is still in existence, but has moved from The Strand to another London address.
Gardner	Robert Gardner (d. 1875) was a Glasgow supplier who founded the business of Gardner and McGregor in 1834. He may not be the manufacturer of the chronometers he sold. His son of the same name (b. 1851) was a noted horological collector.
McCabe	McCabe was a London clock and watchmaker active from 1780 to 1811. He was born in Ireland but moved to London in 1775. The business he founded continued to trade until 1883.
Molyneux	Robert Molyneux (d.1876) was a clock and watchmaker with premises in Southampton Row. The partnership R. & H. Molyneux was formed between Robert and his son Henry in 1835. The business was succeeded by Birchall & Appleton in 1842, who in turn were succeeded by William E. Cribb.
Morrice	D. & W. Morrice, chronometer, clock and watchmakers, 80 Cornhill, London.
Murray	James Murray (1780–1847) was a Scottish clock, watch and chronometer maker with a business at the Royal Exchange from 1815 to 1847. His chronometer no. 819 won the top prize in the Greenwich trials for 1823 and later accompanied William Parry on his final attempt to find the Northwest Passage. His chronometers also accompanied James Weddell to the Antarctic Ocean, reaching, in 1823, the most southerly point achieved by any ship or chronometer up to that time. His son, James, continued the business and set up subsidiaries in Melbourne and Calcutta.
Parkinson & Frodsham	William Parkinson and William James Frodsham (1778–1850) formed a London business in 1801. Frodsham came from a long line of watchmakers. He was the grandson of William Frodsham, who was taught by Earnshaw, and his mother was the granddaughter of the famous John Harrison, the inventor of the first marine chronometer. He was also the father of Charles Frodsham. The company continued to trade until 1947.
Pennington	Robert Pennington (1780–1844) was a chronometer maker from Camberwell. Robert Pennington & Son was a partnership between Pennington and his son John that existed between 1832 and 1842. Pennington Sr. invented an improved sector.

== Nomenclature ==
In the following lists, the designation letter ("Des." column) is a reference assigned to the chronometer while it was on board ship and was used to identify the instrument in logged tables of chronometer readings during the voyage. It was a temporary designation with no relevance once the ship's mission was over. The number ("No." column) was a number permanently marked on it by the maker and together with the maker's name uniquely identified the instrument. When referring to chronometers, the maker's name is frequently abbreviated; for instance, Earnshaw's chronometer no. 509 is known simply as E509. The "type" of all chronometers listed here is either box or pocket. A boxed chronometer is mounted on gimbals attached to its box. A pocket chronometer is in the style of a pocketwatch. "Winding" refers to the number of days that a chronometer kept going before needing rewinding. However, they were all wound at precisely the same time every day, except for the eight-day chronometers which were wound weekly.

== First voyage ==
On its first voyage (1826–1830), the Beagle accompanied the Adventure, which led the expedition under the command of Phillip Parker King. The Beagle was initially commanded by Pringle Stokes, but Stokes became depressed and shot himself on 1 August 1828 while the expedition was at Port Famine. He died 12 days later. After a brief temporary command by Lieutenant Skyring, Robert Fitz-Roy, future first head of the Met Office, was appointed the new commander of Beagle.

Beagle carried only three chronometers on this expedition; the majority of the expedition's chronometers were on board Adventure (see next section).

Chronometers on first voyage (Beagle)
Des.	Maker	No.	Owner	Type	Winding	Comments	Ref.
–	Parkinson & Frodsham	228	Government	box	–	Assessed by King as "excellent", These two chronometers had previously been used on polar voyages before being assigned to Beagle.	
–	Parkinson & Frodsham	254	Government	box	–	Assessed by King as "excellent", These two chronometers had previously been used on polar voyages before being assigned to Beagle.	
–	McCabe	228	Government	box	–	Assessed by King as "excellent"	

== Adventure's chronometers ==
As the lead ship, the Adventure carried the majority of the expedition's chronometers during the Beagle's first expedition. They are included here for completeness.

King both commanded the Adventure and led the expedition. His mission was to chart the coast of South America from the southern shore of the Río de la Plata to Tierra del Fuego. King was also ordered to use his chronometers to accurately determine the longitude of several points, mostly Atlantic islands, on the outward journey to South America. These included Madeira, Tenerife, the Cape Verde islands, and Rio de Janeiro.

Chronometers on first voyage (Adventure)
Des.	Maker	No.	Owner	Type	Winding	Comments	Ref.
A	French	3296	Government	box	two-day	Chronometers A to D were fitted in a box divided into compartments with each chronometer suspended from gimbals. Chronometer Z was also included in this box but fitted individually.	
B	French	3295	Government	box	two-day	Chronometers A to D were fitted in a box divided into compartments with each chronometer suspended from gimbals. Chronometer Z was also included in this box but fitted individually.	
C	French	3271	Government	box	two-day	Chronometers A to D were fitted in a box divided into compartments with each chronometer suspended from gimbals. Chronometer Z was also included in this box but fitted individually.	
D	French	3227	Government	box	two-day	Chronometers A to D were fitted in a box divided into compartments with each chronometer suspended from gimbals. Chronometer Z was also included in this box but fitted individually.	
E	French	3290	Government	box	one-day	Chronometers E to H were fitted in a box divided into compartments with each chronometer suspended from gimbals.	
F	French	3291	Government	box	one-day	Chronometers E to H were fitted in a box divided into compartments with each chronometer suspended from gimbals.	
G	French	3292	Government	box	one-day	Chronometers E to H were fitted in a box divided into compartments with each chronometer suspended from gimbals.	
H	French	3293	Government	box	one-day	Chronometers E to H were fitted in a box divided into compartments with each chronometer suspended from gimbals.	
Z	French	3233	Government	box	eight-day	–	

Chronometers A to H were new and King showed concern that they had not yet properly settled to a steady rate. It was the custom for Navy chronometers to be run for six months or so at the Greenwich Observatory and the rate checked before issuing to a ship. It was well known that new chronometers typically took six months to settle to a steady rate.

Chronometer Z and the two boxes containing chronometers A to D and E to H respectively were fixed in a chest and secured to the deck as low down as practicable in the centre of the ship. This placed them near the ship's centre of motion which minimised movement. Fixing them in one place also ensured that the magnetic influence of the ship on the chronometers remained fixed and that the effect this had on the chronometer's rates stayed constant. Since the rates were regularly checked and variations allowed for in the calculations, the magnetic effect of the ship was automatically taken into account.

Chronometers on first voyage (Adventure, additional)
Des.	Maker	No.	Owner	Type	Winding	Comments	Ref.
–	Murray	553	–	pocket	–	–	
–	Parkinson & Frodsham	1048	Parkinson & Frodsham	pocket	–	–	
–	French	–	French	pocket	–	–	

Murray 553 had been on trial at the Greenwich Observatory for several months and had performed well. It was a welcome addition given King's concern over the newness of the French chronometers. Parkinson & Frodsham 1048 was lent to King by the makers for trial during the voyage. However, its manufacture was only completed two days before the Adventure set sail, leaving no time to check and settle the rate. The French pocket chronometer was another loan, this time from the maker of the main batch of government chronometers. It was used by King as a journeyman watch, transferring readings to and from the place of measurement, which allowed the principal chronometers to be left undisturbed.

== Second voyage ==
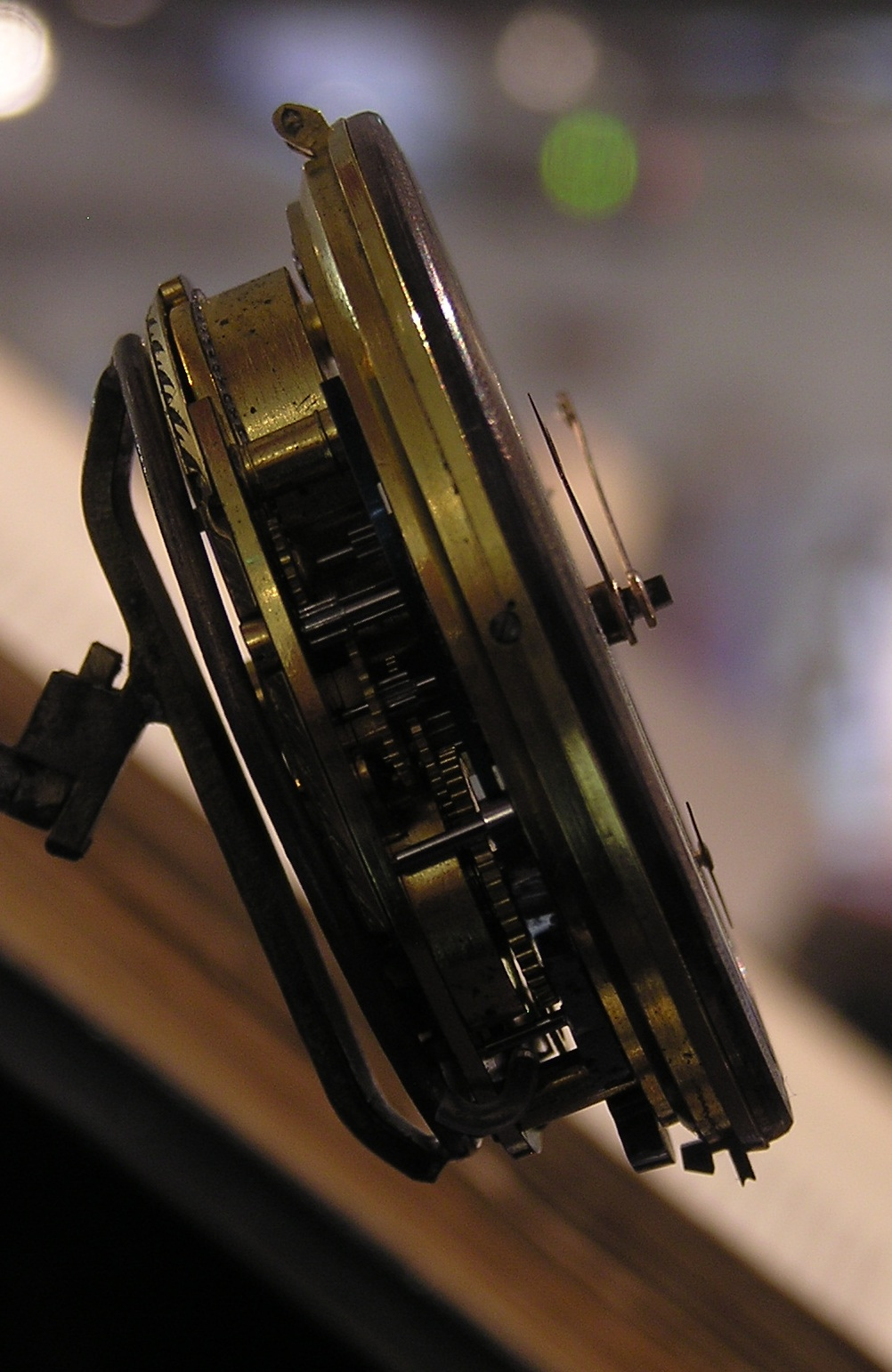
Side view of Pennington's chronometer (chronometer V) showing the movement

The second voyage of the Beagle was commanded by Fitz-Roy and lasted from 1831 to 1836. The mission given to Fitz-Roy was two-fold. Firstly, he was to continue the survey work of South America by King on the first voyage and extend it through Tierra del Fuego around to the coast of Chile on the west side of the continent. Secondly, he was to establish a chain of reference points with known longitudes that could be used by future mariners to accurately set their chronometers. This was also the voyage that carried Charles Darwin. Fitz-Roy was given a detailed list of objectives by the Admiralty Hydrographer's office. The first part of the journey more or less repeated King's, partly to check King's results, but also to break the journey into small sections so that the chronometers could be rated over four days at each stop and changes in temperature between references would not affect them too severely.

Beagle was not allowed to land at Tenerife through fears that those aboard would bring cholera, but the ship proceeded to Cape Verde, Fernando de Noronha and Rio de Janeiro. She then spent some time surveying the coast of South America south from Rio de Janeiro, around Tierra del Fuego, the coast of Chile and as far north as Peru. Fitz-Roy finally detached Beagle from South America in August 1835. The Admiralty had not precisely specified his itinerary across the Pacific since they could not be sure how far north he would be able to survey in the time available, and hence precisely where he would be leaving from. But they did specify that he should stop at Tahiti, a point of previously well-determined longitude. The Admiralty also required that, like the journey across the Atlantic, it should be done in small stages to frequently rate the chronometers. Fitz-Roy chose to go via the Galápagos Islands. Subsequently Beagle visited Tahiti, New Zealand, Australia and Mauritius.

Using chronometers, the crew of Beagle succeeded in providing a chain of longitude distances that completely circled the globe for the first time. The sum of the differences in local noon between each location should have amounted to 24 hours since the Beagle completed a circumnavigation of the globe. The total discrepancy was only 33 seconds but Fitz-Roy considered this too large to be explained by chronometer inaccuracy alone and none of his results disagreed excessively with earlier surveys. He suggested that sailing mostly in the same direction relative to the Earth's magnetic field was having a small unexplained effect on the chronometers. Nevertheless, an error equivalent to only 8.25 nautical miles (15.3 km) on a five-year voyage over tens of thousands of miles was a remarkable achievement.

Each of Beagle's chronometers was contained in its own box, suspended on gimbals. These boxes were planted into a thick bed of sawdust laid in partitioned shelves, like open-top boxes, one partition for each chronometer. The whole assembly was placed in a small, dedicated cabin low down in the ship as near as possible to the ship's centre of motion. Most of the chronometers remained in this cabin throughout the entire trip. Not all of the chronometers were provided by the Government; some were owned personally by Fitz-Roy and one was lent by Lord Ashburnham. Others were lent by chronometer makers, who were keen to gain the prestige of having had instruments aboard major, well-publicised expeditions.

No one was allowed in the chronometer cabin except when it was necessary to read or maintain them. Fitz-Roy employed an instrument maker, George James Stebbing, to look after the chronometers and ensure they were regularly and properly wound. Fitz-Roy paid Stebbing himself since the Admiralty had declined to do so and Fitz-Roy considered the function essential. The Admiralty conceded that Stebbing could be fed from the ship's stores – a favour not extended to Darwin who paid £500 (inflation adjusted £44,800) for his keep.

Chronometers on second voyage
Des.	Extended comments	Maker	No.	Owner	Type	Winding	Comments	Ref.
A		Molyneux	1415	Fitz-Roy	box	eight-day	Assessed by Fitz-Roy as "good"	
B		Gardner	24	Government	box	one-day	Assessed by Fitz-Roy as "bad". It was not used after February 1835. (Note: Although Fitz-Roy states that it was not used, chronometer B appears again in the tables of measurements after Beagle had left Peru, presumably because Fitz-Roy now had a much reduced stock of chronometers.)	
C		Molyneux	1081	Molyneux	box	one-day	Assessed by Fitz-Roy as "rather good"	
D		Murray	542	Murray	box	eight-day	Assessed by Fitz-Roy as "rather good"	
E		Eiffe	E	Government	box	one-day	Assessed by Fitz-Roy as "rather good"	
F		Arnold & Dent	661	Arnold & Dent	box	two-day	Assessed by Fitz-Roy as "rather good"	
G		Arnold & Dent	633	Fitz-Roy	box	one-day	Assessed by Fitz-Roy as "rather good"	
H		Arnold & Dent	261	Fitz-Roy	pocket	one-day	Assessed by Fitz-Roy as "rather good"	
K		Parkinson & Frodsham	1042	Government	pocket	one-day	Assessed by Fitz-Roy as "rather good"	
K	Chronometer K was used as the journeyman chronometer, carried to the place of measurement in its box (despite being a "pocket" chronometer). On most days, while under sail, the place of measurement was the ship's deck to determine the ship's position at sea. It was compared with the two best chronometers (the standards) immediately before and after each use and always agreed with the standard. (Note: Fitz-Roy gives the number of the journeyman chronometer as 1041, but it does not appear to be a different instrument to 1042 in his list of chronometers. There is no Parkinson & Frodsham 1041 listed in the Greenwich ledgers.)							
L		Arnold	634	Fitz-Roy	box	two-day	Assessed by Fitz-Roy as "rather good"	
M		Frodsham	2	Government	box	one-day	Assessed by Fitz-Roy as "rather good".	
M	Chronometer M was later part of a set used to survey the British–US border in North America in 1846. It was reported to have stood up well to the cold conditions.							
N		Molyneux	1175	Fitz-Roy	box	two-day	Assessed by Fitz-Roy as "rather good"	
O		Earnshaw	705	Government	box	one-day	Assessed by Fitz-Roy as "rather good"	
P		Frodsham	1	Government	box	one-day	Assessed by Fitz-Roy as "bad". It was not used after September 1835.	
R		Murray	584	Murray	box	one-day	Assessed by Fitz-Roy as "very good"	
S		Arnold	465	Government	box	one-day	Assessed by Fitz-Roy as "rather good"	
T		Molyneux	1326	Fitz-Roy	pocket	one-day	Assessed by Fitz-Roy as "indifferent"	
V		Pennington	426	Lord Ashburnham	pocket	one-day	Assessed by Fitz-Roy as "rather good"	
V	Chronometer V is at the British Museum (Registration No. 1958,1201.1743). It is one of only three surviving chronometers from the 22 carried on Beagle.							
W		Molyneux	971	Government	box	two-day	Assessed by Fitz-Roy as "good"	
X		Earnshaw	509	Government	box	one-day	Assessed by Fitz-Roy as "rather good"	
X	Main article: Ship's chronometer from HMS Beagle Chronometer X is the second of the three survivors from Beagle's 22 chronometers and is at the British Museum (Registration No. 1958,1006.1957). It was featured in the BBC Radio 4 series A History of the World in 100 Objects as object number 91.							
Y		Morrice	6144	Government	pocket	one-day	Assessed by Fitz-Roy as "rather good"	
Z		French	4214	Government	box	eight-day	Assessed by Fitz-Roy as "good"	

=== Attrition ===
Beagle left with 22 chronometers, but returned to Devonport with only 11 still in working order. Four had been left in Peru with Beagle's Master's Assistant, Alexander Burns Usborne, who had been put in charge of a small boat, Constitución, to continue the survey of the coast of Peru. The mainspring of chronometer R had broken and several others had stopped. The 11 still in use were A, B, C, D, G, H, L, N, O, S and Z.

A chronometer was damaged as Beagle was approaching Cape Horn on 13 January 1833. The ship was hit by three enormous rolling waves in quick succession. The first wave slowed the ship sufficiently that she could no longer make way and the second turned her broadside to the third. This last wave rolled the ship so far that the bulwark on the opposite side went 2 to 3 feet (0.6 to 0.9 m) under water. This was a critical moment for Beagle; many of her class had been lost through capsizing.

== Third voyage ==
The third voyage of Beagle, under the command of John Clements Wickham, began in 1837 with a mission to chart the west coast of Australia between the Fitzroy River and the Swan River, and the Bass Strait – the channel separating mainland Australia from Tasmania. In 1839 Beagle was taken north to explore the Arafura Sea where Port Darwin was discovered and named. The voyage is also notable for the watercolour paintings of fish and other wildlife produced by 1st Lt. James Barker Emery. In March 1841 Wickham gave up command due to illness and returned to England. Command was then given to John Lort Stokes.

Other than mentioning that he carried a pocket chronometer by French which gave good results, Stokes' account of the voyage does not list or even enumerate the chronometers. (Note: The source for the table of the third voyage is the ledgers kept at the Greenwich Observatory of chronometer movements. Although this was the usual Royal Navy source of chronometers at the time, (Gould, p. 253) in the absence of details from the ship's captain it cannot be guaranteed that additional chronometers were not supplied from other depots, or the personal property of the ship's officers. Nor does the issue of a chronometer indicate how well it actually worked in the field or even if it was used at all.) It may be that chronometers were now so commonplace that their use was no longer something of note. However it is quite clear that the chronometers remained a key part of the mission; frequent stops were made throughout the voyage to check the rates. On 7 December 1839 Stokes went ashore at Point Pearce near the mouth of Victoria River to make observations. Even though he knew the indigenous Australians could be dangerous, he left behind his gun to more safely carry a chronometer. While separated, Stokes was pursued by a group of Australians, one of whom pierced Stokes' chest cavity with a spear throw. Despite his wounds and profuse bleeding, Stokes considered the chronometer to be valuable enough to save; he carried it while he staggered back to his comrades barely able to walk and still being pursued by his attackers.

Chronometers on third voyage
Des.	Extended comments	Maker	No.	Owner	Type	Winding	Comments	Ref.
–		Arnold	818	Government	box	–	Issued to Beagle on 27 May 1837 and returned to Greenwich on 13 October 1843.	
–		Dent	114	Government	box	one-day	Issued to Beagle on 27 May 1837 and returned to Greenwich on 13 October 1843.	
–		French	4214	Government	box	eight-day	Issued to Beagle on 27 May 1837 and returned to Greenwich on 13 October 1843.	
–	This chronometer was also on the second voyage. It was lost in HMS Erebus when she was abandoned ice-bound in the Arctic during Franklin's lost expedition to find the Northwest Passage.							Erebus was rediscovered in 2014.
–		Arnold and Dent	633	Government	box	one-day	Issued to Beagle on 27 May 1837 and returned to Greenwich on 13 October 1843. This chronometer was also on the second voyage. It was the personal property of Fitzroy. It was purchased from him on 6 May 1837.	
–		Molyneux	1175	Government	box	two-day	Issued to Beagle on 27 May 1837 and returned to Greenwich on 13 October 1843.	
–	This chronometer was also on the second voyage and was the personal property of Fitzroy. It was purchased from him on 6 May 1837. The chronometer was believed lost in the battleship HMS Irresistible when she was sunk in the Dardanelles on 18 March 1915 after she struck a mine and came under fire from Turkish shore batteries during the Dardanelles Campaign of World War I.							In 2014, the chronometer resurfaced and was auctioned by Bonhams.
–		French	210/3036	Government	pocket	–	Issued to Beagle on 27 May 1837 and returned to Greenwich on 13 October 1843. The chronometer was disposed of during the Syrian expedition of 1860.	
–		Arnold	138	Government	pocket	–	Issued to Beagle on 22 May 1837 directly from Arnold & Son and returned to Devonport in 1842.	
–		Arnold	294	Government	–	–	Issued to Beagle on 3 June 1837 and returned to Greenwich on 13 October 1843. This chronometer was thought to be lost with Erebus in the Arctic but was otherwise mislaid and converted into a carriage clock.	
–		Eiffe	E	Government	box	one-day	Issued to Beagle on 3 June 1837 and returned to Greenwich on 13 October 1843. This chronometer was also on the second voyage.	

== Bibliography ==
- Anderson, Katharine, Predicting the Weather: Victorians and the Science of Meteorology, Chicago: University of Chicago Press, 2005 ISBN 0-226-01968-3.
- Britten, Frederick James, Old Clocks and Watches & Their Makers, London: E. & N. Spon Limited, 1922 OCLC 192215931.
- Chamberlain, Paul Mellen, It's About Time, New York: Richard R. Smith, 1941 OCLC 396120.
- Darwin, Charles The Origin of Species and the Voyage of the Beagle, New York: Alfred A. Knopf 2003 ISBN 1-4000-4127-9.
- Delgado, James P., Across the Top of the World: the Quest for the Northwest Passage, Vancouver: Douglas & McIntyre, 1999 ISBN 1-55054-734-8.
- Fisher, Robin; Johnston, Hugh J. M., From maps to metaphors: the Pacific world of George Vancouver, Vancouver: UBC Press, 1993 ISBN 0-7748-0470-X.
- Fitz-Roy, Robert, Narrative of the Surveying Voyages of His Majesty's Ships Adventure and Beagle, Between the Years 1826 and 1836, Volume 2 (1831–1836), London: Henry Colburn, 1839 OCLC 8076691.
  - Fitz-Roy, Robert; King, Phillip Parker, "Remarks on the chronometrical observations made during the surveying voyages of H. M. Ships Adventure and Beagle, between the years 1826 and 1836", Appendix to Volume 2, pp. 318–345.
- Gould, Rupert T., The Marine Chronometer, London: Holland Press 1960 OCLC 7447074
- Haycox, Stephen W.; Barnett, James; Liburd, Caedmon, Enlightenment and Exploration in the North Pacific, 1741–1805, Seattle: University of Washington Press, 1997 ISBN 0-295-97583-0.
- King, Phillip Parker, Narrative of the Surveying Voyages of His Majesty's Ships Adventure and Beagle, Between the Years 1826 and 1836, Volume 1 (1826–1830), London: Henry Colburn, 1839 OCLC 222739205.
- Leahy, Frank, "William John Wills as scientist", McCann, D. A.; Joyce, E. B. (eds), Burke and Wills: The Scientific Legacy of the Victorian Exploring Expedition, pp. 23–57, Australia: Csiro Publishing, 2011 ISBN 0-643-10332-5.
- Macdonald, Fiona, Inside the Beagle with Charles Darwin, Brighton: Salariya Publishers, 2005 ISBN 1-904642-92-6.
- Nicholas, F. W.; Nicholas, Janice Mary, Charles Darwin in Australia, Cambridge: Cambridge University Press, 2002 ISBN 0-521-01702-5.
- Pipon, John H., "Narrative of the survey, by the British Commission, of the boundary between the British possessions in North America and the United States of America, under the Treaty of Washington of the 9th of August 1842", Corps Papers and Memoirs on Military Subjects, The Royal Engineers and East India Company's Engineers, vol. 1, no. 2, pp. 107–169, London: John Weale 1849 OCLC 13671974.
- Robson, William, Robson's London Directory, Street Key, Classification of Trades, and Royal Court Guide and Peerage, London: Robson and Co., 1842 OCLC 701644407.
- Rubin, Jeff, Antarctica, London: Lonely Planet, 2008 ISBN 1-74104-549-5.
- Stokes, John Lort, Discoveries in Australia; With an Account of the Coasts and Rivers Explored and Surveyed During The Voyage of H.M.S. Beagle, in the Years 1837-38-39-40-41-42-43, Volume 1, Volume 2, London: T. and W. Boone 1846 OCLC 68647763.
- Taylor, James, The Voyage of the Beagle: Darwin's Extraordinary Adventure in Fitzroy's Famous Survey Ship, London: Anova Books, 2008 ISBN 1-84486-066-3.
- Thompson, Julian, Imperial War Museum Book of the War at Sea 1914–18, London: Pan Macmillan, 2011 ISBN 0-330-54076-9.
- Williams, Nat; Dent, Margaret, National Treasures from Australia's Great Libraries, Canberra: National Library Australia, 2005 ISBN 0-642-27620-X.
