= Inchbald School of Design =

Coordinates: 51.491912°N 0.145319°W

The Inchbald School of Design was founded in Chelsea, London, England in 1960 by Jacqueline Ann Duncan (then Jacqueline Inchbald, married to and working with designer Michael Inchbald), in the family home at 10 Milner Street.

== Description ==
The impetus for this project arose as a result of a London visit by a group of American designers under the aegis of the American Institute of Designers (AID) on their way to Venice. Prominent among them was the New York designer William Pahlmann, who expressed surprise that England did not have either a formalised professional body or any specific educational centre for interior design training.

Jacqueline researched the possibility of a school and this coincided with a burgeoning interest in interiors in the climate of resuscitation in the post war years. This interest was fostered by the media in the form of domestic magazines, images from abroad particularly America and the founding of the English House & Garden magazine under the editorship of Anthony Hunt.

The school started as a Ten Week Course, programmed to answer the demand for more and practical information about the design and decoration of the domestic interior. Within ten years the school premises were moved to a large house on the Belgravia Estate, No 7 Eaton Gate, and the programmes now included a more professionally orientated Year Course in Interior Design. As a result of this more structured approach Inchbald students became much in demand in the profession and famous graduates like Nina Campbell, Stephen Ryan, Kelly Hoppen and Lady Henrietta Spencer-Churchill all started their careers at Inchbald.

In 1974 Jacqueline Inchbald started the Garden Design School, a new concept developed to train professional Garden Designers interested in private clients, to complement the skills of the Landscape Designers in a market section which had been largely confined to hobbyists. Alumni include Luciano Giubellei, Phillip Nixon, Marcus Barnett, all of them Gold medallists at Chelsea.

These two Faculties were then the only specialist centres outside America, in itself an interesting point since it could be said that it was the Americans who created a demand on a broad scale for the best available in interior design; and it was the American concept of contemporary lifestyle which prompted the notion that the small garden should be prioritised as an important facility in exactly the same way as the Interior of the house.

In 1999, after nearly forty outstandingly successful years during which Inchbald established an international reputation, the School was validated by the University of Wales.

The present curriculum includes Architectural Interior Design, Interior Decoration and Garden Design.

In 2007, Inchbald Online was introduced. Currently, the entire curriculum is available online.

Jacqueline Duncan, now known as the Dean and still running the School, was 86 on 16 December 2017.
