= Lennox Gardens, London =

Garden square in Knightsbridge, London

Coordinates: 51°29′44.07″N 0°9′47.39″W

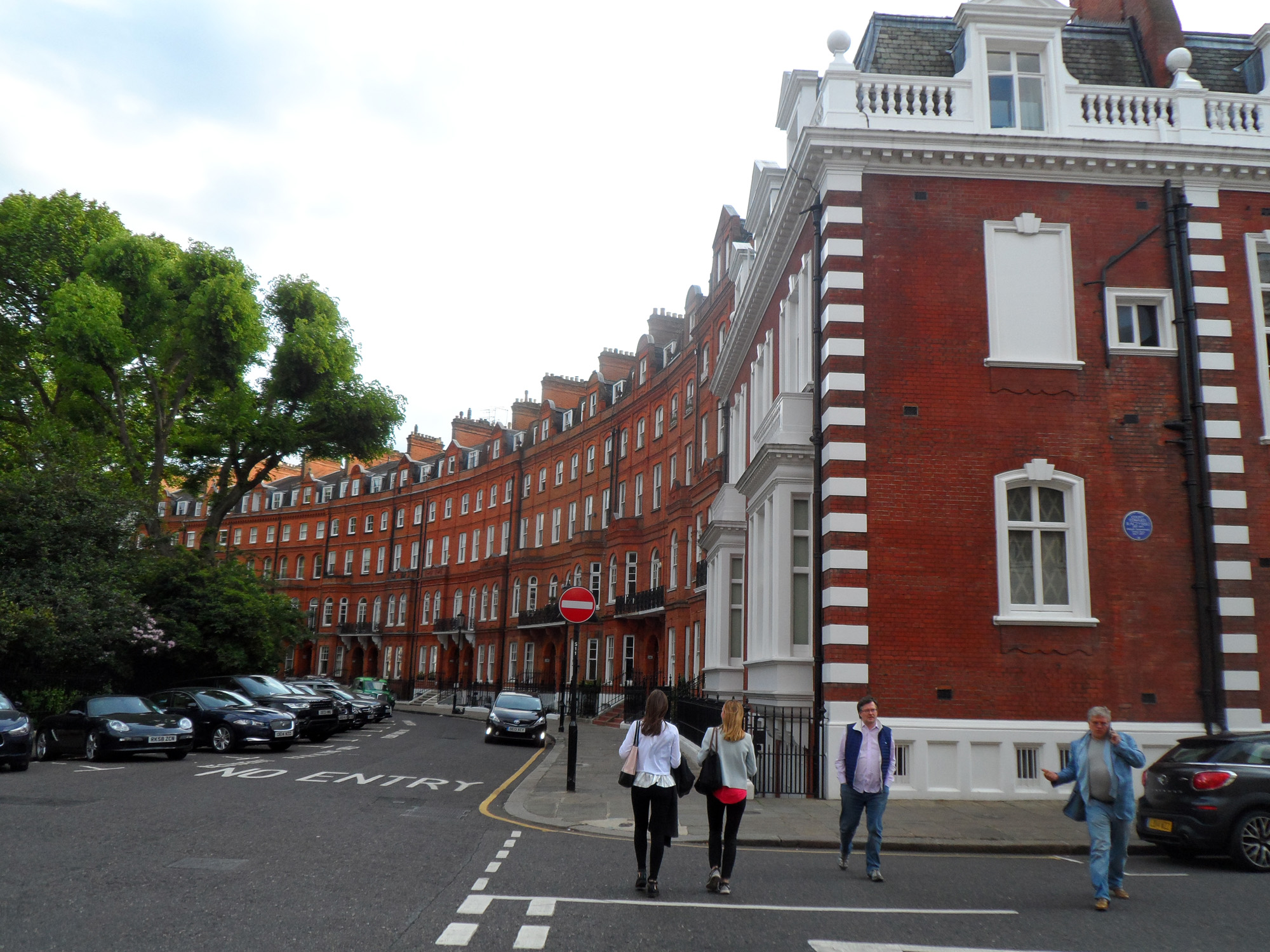
Lennox Gardens in July 2015

Lennox Gardens is a garden square in the Knightsbridge district of London SW1X. It is one of the most exclusive garden squares in Knightsbridge, and houses on the square are valued at up to £40 million.

The houses surrounding the gardens were built around 1886 as part of the development of Smith's Charity Estate.

Nos 1, 3 and 5, and 2, 4 and 6, at the northern end of Lennox Gardens on opposite sides of the junction with Walton Street are listed Grade II on the National Heritage List for England as is No 8 opposite the rear of St Columba's Church. The east side of the church faces the entrance to Lennox Gardens from Pont Street. 17–43 Lennox Gardens on the east side and of the gardens and No 52 (Lennox Lodge) at the left side of the entrance from Milner Street are also listed Grade II.

The private communal gardens in the centre of Lennox Gardens are 0.4610 hectares (1.139 acres) in size. The gardens are laid out on the pitch of the late 19th-century Prince's Club's former Prince's Cricket Ground, which itself had been laid out on Cattleugh's nursery gardens.

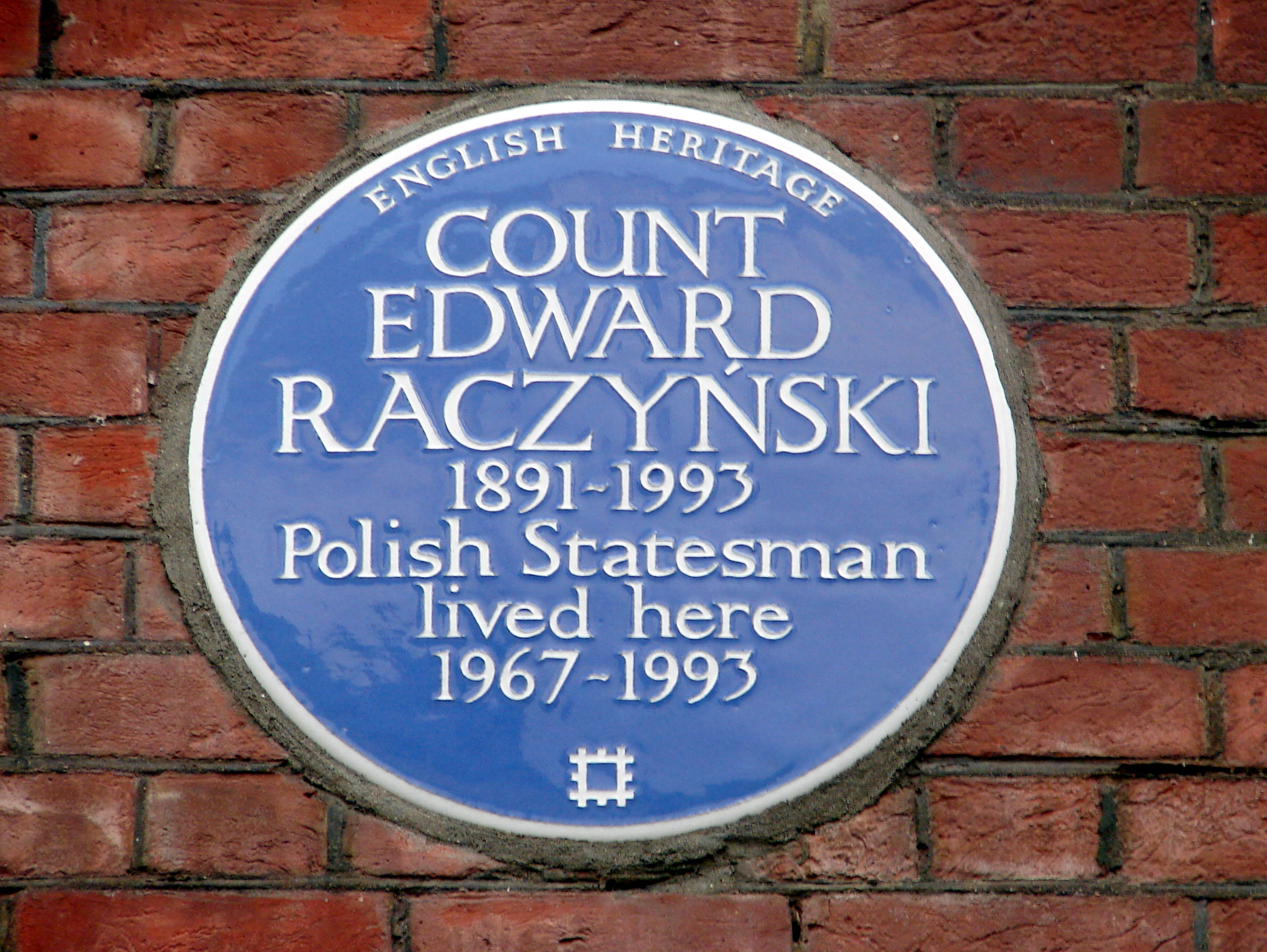
Blue plaque for Count Edward Raczynski, Polish statesman, who lived at no 8, 1967–1993

John Dunbar and his wife Marianne Faithfull lived in a flat in Lennox Gardens in the late 1960s, as did the American writer Anne Edwards and her husband Leon. James Gilbey, a scion of the Gilbey gin family, owned an apartment in Lennox Gardens and it was here that he would meet Diana, Princess of Wales during their romance from the summer of 1989. Their relationship was later captured in the Squidgygate tapes.

Section 2 of the American poet Charles Wright's 1983 poem A Journal of English Days is set during a rainy afternoon in Lennox Gardens where the narrator imagines the Greek ferryman of the underworld, Charon crossing the River Thames in the rain. Section 4 of the poem depicts a walk around the area immediately surrounding Lennox Gardens.

Lord Wakehurst and his family lived in a house in Lennox Gardens in the 1950s, his son, the future businessman and art collector Robert Loder let his friend Jonathan Gathorne-Hardy stay in a flat on the top floor of their property. Gathorne-Hardy recalled living in Lennox Gardens in his 2004 memoir, Half an Arch.

George Devey's design for a house for Samuel Juler Wyand at 25 Lennox Gardens is in the collection of the British Architectural Library.

The average price of a property in Lennox Gardens was £2.2 million in 2018.
