= Lovell Squire =

British meteorologist and poet (1809–1892)

Lovell Squire (1809–1892) was a Quaker schoolteacher, meteorologist and writer of sacred verse.

== Birth and education ==
He was born 8 May 1809 at Earith in Huntingdonshire, the son of Lovell Squire (1779–1837) and Sarah (born Brown 1783–1860). His mother was a Recorded Minister of the Religious Society of Friends. He was educated at Godmanchester Grammar School.

== Teaching ==
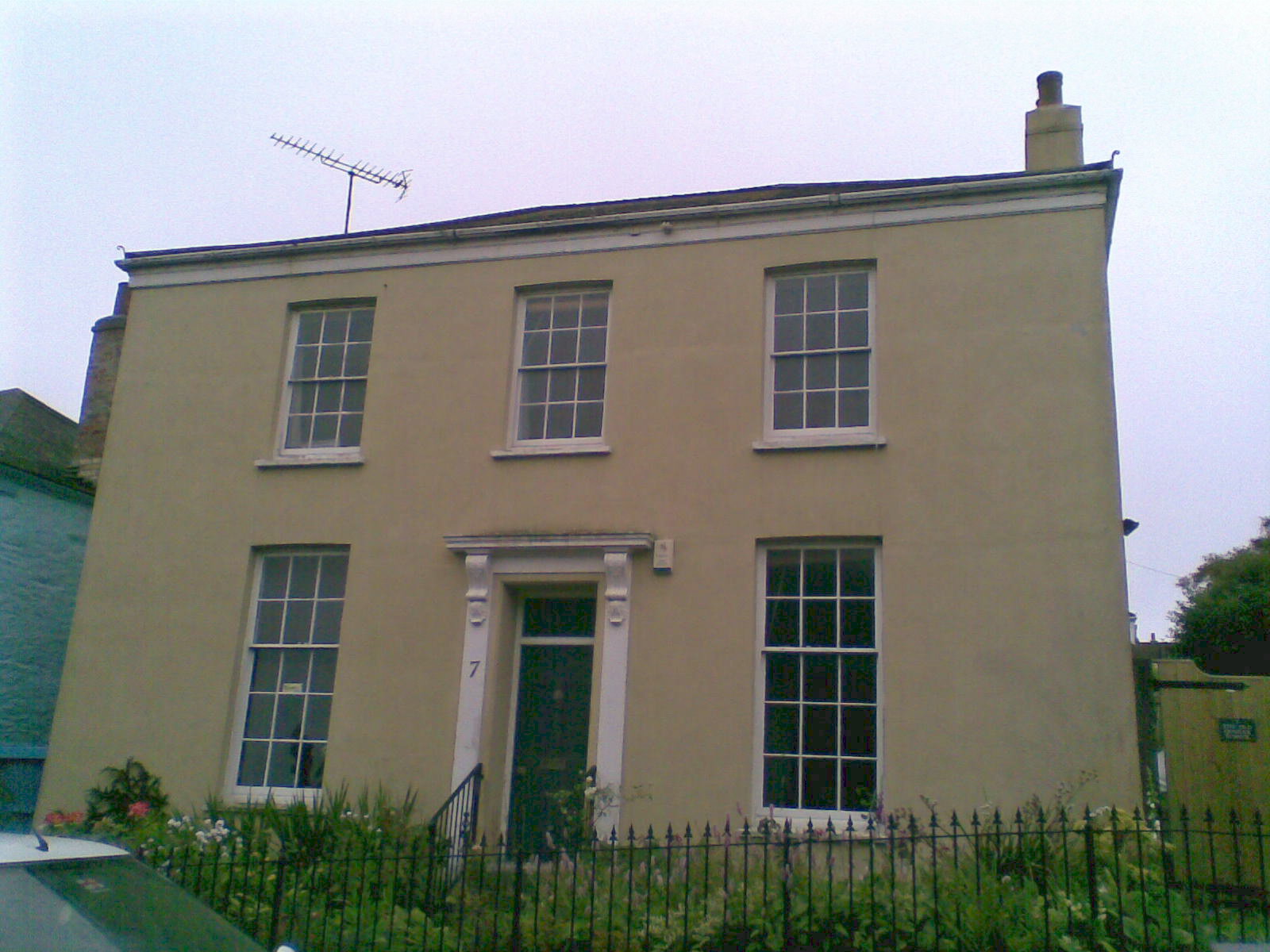
Building in Kimberley Place, Falmouth, which used to be Lovell Squire's school

In 1829, he became a teacher at York School (later called Bootham School). He introduced the study of Natural History there.

In 1834, he moved to Cornwall, where he was tutor to the children of John (1780–1875) and Ann (born Richards) Stephens and their friends at Ashfield, near Falmouth This work developed into a Quaker boarding school, which ran from at least 1839 to 1849.

The school was advertised with a flyer. The copy said:

School for Friends' children / FALMOUTH/Conducted by / LOVELL SQUIRE /Terms / Board and Instruction in the usual Branches of a good / English Education £35 Pr. Annum / Latin & Greek, each £2 extra French £4 drawing £4.4.0 WASHING £2.2 / SEPARATE BEDROOMS AT AN EXTRA CHARGE OF £5 Pr. ANNUM / Lectures on various branches of Natural Philosophy are given weekly in the winter months / A vacation of six weeks in the Summer / Three months notice is requested previously to the removal of a pupil / NB The pupils have the advantage of sea bathing.

After the school closed, he became again a private tutor to Barclay Fox's family. Fox died in 1855: it is presumed that before 1849, the older boys attended the school.

== Marriage and family ==
On 27 June 1836, he married Henrietta Crouch, daughter of William and Lucretia (born Anson) Crouch. Henrietta Squire died in 1848 at the age of 40, after having given birth to seven children. His sister-in-law, Elizabeth Crouch, is shown as housekeeper in the 1851 Census, along with three resident pupils.

=== Children ===
- Lovell 28 April 1837
- Henrietta Elizabeth 28 June 1838, died 8 July 1840
- Anson 24 February 1840
- Henrietta Elizabeth 1 July 1841
- Margaret 26 July 1843
- William Crouch 14 July 1845
- Edward 21 September 1847

== The Penjerrick Foxes ==
He was recorded as a Minister of the Religious Society of Friends in 1863, as was his mother, Sarah Squire. She visited Falmouth in September 1836.

In his journal, Barclay Fox records (1st day, 18th of 9th month) that she spoke and prayed extensively at a revivalist meeting in Breage and then on 20th "paid us a religious visit" – "After much counsel &c. to us in family assembled, she had a private interview with me in the dining room in order to go more into particulars. No doubt if I could have kept to her precepts I should be much better than I am. She informed me inferentially that there was room for improvement. Methought I could have told her that much & much more if I thought it necessary".

However, this admonitory experience did not prevent Barclay Fox supporting the school: in his Journal, he records arranging a number of parties and entertainments for the boys at his property at Penjerrick.

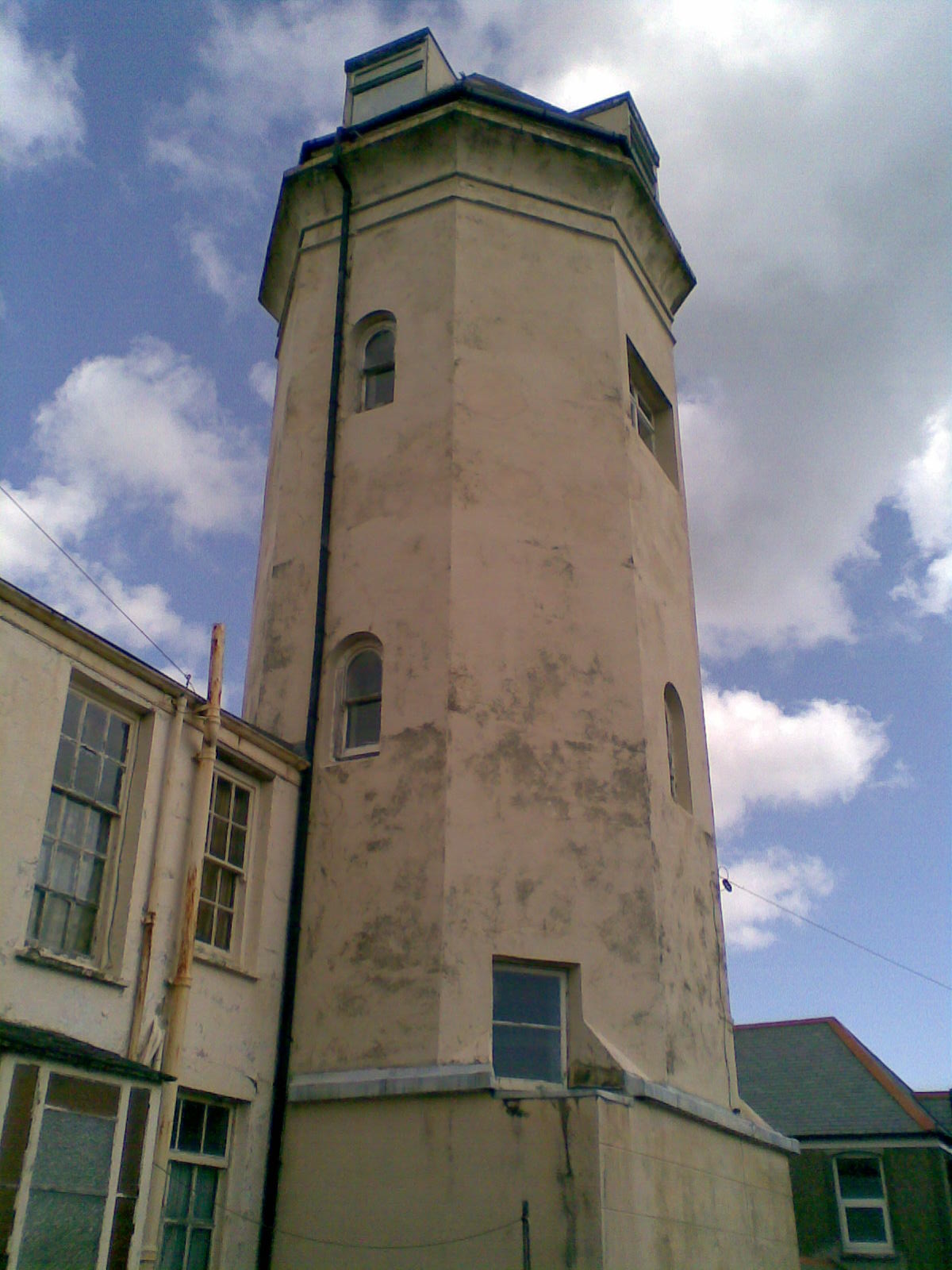
The first meteorological Observatory built by the Royal Cornwall Polytechnic Society and superintended by Lovell Squire

== Scientific and philanthropic work ==
Lovell Squire moved away from Falmouth in 1864 but returned when appointed as Superintendent of the new Meteorological Observatory, that the Royal Cornwall Polytechnic Society had erected. He served until 1882.

During this time "he identified himself with all the scientific and philanthropic work going on in Falmouth : he was assistant secretary to the Polytechnic . . . honorary secretary to the Dispensary and the Humane Society and one of the directors of the Cornwall Sailors' Home, and he learned Italian in order to read the Bible, in this Home, to Italian sailors".

In his journal entry for 2 November 1841, Barclay Fox records: "Assisted at Lovell Squire's lecture on Useful applications of Science, with some striking illustrations. Davy's lamp & the Bude light, both of which, as well as the invention of the gas light by burning carburetted hydrogen, which was invented by Murdock, were of Cornish origin. . . . It was a good and useful lecture, well delivered, without pretension or fear."

== Later life ==
In 1882, he retired and moved to Hammersmith. He died 7 March 1892, aged 82 in Chiswick.

== Publications ==
He was the author of some religious poetry, published by Charles Gilpin, his wife's sister's husband, under the title A selection of scriptural poetry in 1838, which was reprinted twice, with additional hymns in the 1848 edition. In 1876 he published a volume entitled Day by Day consisting of biblical texts and original verses for each day of the year. A sample of his verse is included in Evelyn Armitage's biographies and anthology of the verse of Quaker poets (1896), page 248.
