= Jacqueline Ann Duncan =

British educator

Jacqueline Ann Duncan OBE (née Pentney, born 16 December 1931) is a British educator, and the founder of the Inchbald School of Design (when she was Jacqueline Inchbald).

== Early life ==
She was born Jacqueline Ann Pentney on 16 December 1931, daughter of Sonia Pentney, She was educated at Convent of the Sacred Heart, Brighton, and the House of Citizenship, London.

== Honours ==
She was appointed an OBE in 2013.

== Personal life ==
In 1955, she married Michael Inchbald, they had one son and one daughter, and divorced in 1964. On 5 June 1974, she married Brigadier Peter Trevenen Thwaites (1926-1991), younger son of Lt. Col. N. G. Thwaites, who died in 1991. In 1994, she married Colonel Andrew Tobin Warwick Duncan, LVO, OBE.
