= Michael Inchbald =

British architectural and interior designer

- Born: Michael John Chantrey Inchbald; 8 March 1920
- Died: 23 February 2013 (aged 92)
- Education: Sherborne School
- Alma mater: Architectural Association
- Occupations: Architectural and interior designer
- Spouse(s): Jacqueline Ann Bromley (married 1955-1964); Eunice Haymes (married 1964-1970)
- Children: 2
- Relatives: Sir Courtenay Ilbert (great-uncle)

Michael John Chantrey Inchbald (8 March 1920 - 23 February 2013) was a British architectural and interior designer.

Michael Inchbald was born on 8 March 1920, the son of Geoffrey H. E. Inchbald and Rosemary Ilbert, daughter of Arthur Ilbert and niece of Sir Courtenay Ilbert. He was educated at Sherborne School, followed by studying architecture at the Architectural Association in London.

From 1945, he lived with his uncle horologist Courtenay Adrian Ilbert at his home, Stanley House, 10 Milner Street, Chelsea, and took over the house when his uncle died in 1956.

In 1955, he married Jacqueline Ann Bromley, they had one son and one daughter and divorced in 1964. In 1964, he married Eunice Haymes, and they divorced in 1970.
