= Thomas Earnshaw =

18th and 19th-century British watchmaker

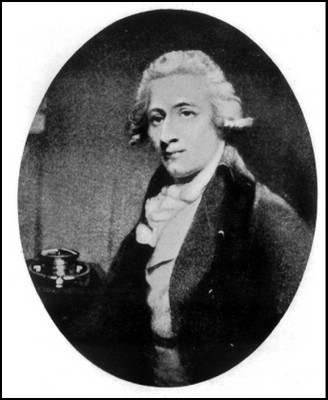
- Born: 4 February 1749; Ashton-under-Lyne, Lancashire, England
- Died: 1 March 1829 (aged 80); London, England
- Occupation: Watchmaker

Thomas Earnshaw (4 February 1749 – 1 March 1829) was an English watchmaker who, following John Arnold's earlier work, further simplified the process of marine chronometer production, making them available to the general public. He is also known for his improvements to the transit clock at the Royal Greenwich Observatory in London and his invention of a chronometer escapement and a form of bimetallic compensation balance.

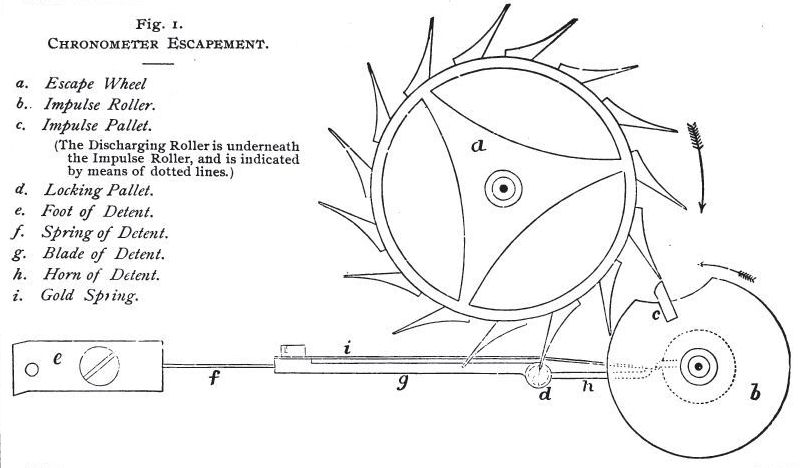
Diagram of Earnshaw's standard chronometer detent escapement.

In 1780, he devised a modification to the detached chronometer escapement, the detent being mounted on a spring instead of on pivots. This spring detent escapement was patented by Thomas Wright (for whom he worked) in 1783. Whilst initially the design was crude and unsuccessful, with modifications it later became the standard form in marine chronometers, following the invention of the detent escapement by Pierre Le Roy in 1748. John Arnold also invented a similar escapement in 1782.

In 1805, Earnshaw and Arnold were granted awards by the Board of Longitude for their improvements to chronometers; Earnshaw received £2500 and John Arnold's son John Roger Arnold received £1672. The bimetallic compensation balance and the spring detent escapement in the forms designed by Earnshaw have been used essentially universally in marine chronometers since then, and for this reason Earnshaw is generally regarded as one of the pioneers of chronometer development.

Although he was principally a watchmaker, he did not shy away from building clocks. When asked by Nevil Maskelyne, he produced a clock for the Armagh Observatory. This clock incorporated Earnshaw's new design of escapement and had a number of novel features, including an airtight case (designed to reduce dust and draughts). It was highly praised by John Thomas Romney Robinson in the 19th century, who at that time believed it to be the most accurate clock in the world. In 1794, its purchase price was £100 and Earnshaw charged £100 to travel with it to Armagh and set it up in the new Observatory.

The Observatory also purchased Earnshaw's second clock which was operated at sidereal rate with Edward Troughton's Equatorial Telescope.

== Chronometers on notable voyages ==
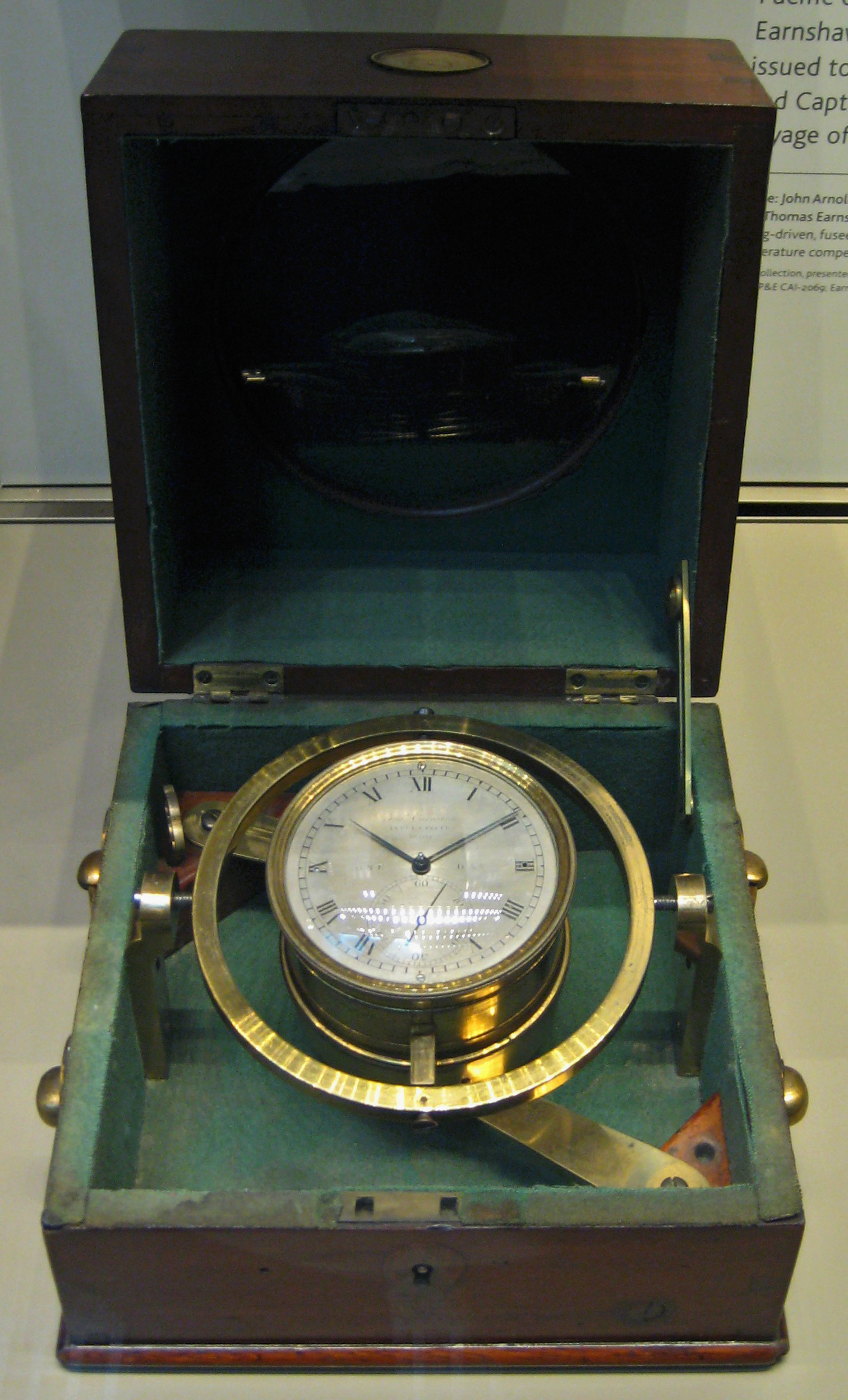
Earnshaw chronometer No. 506

In July, 1791, Captain William Bligh purchased on behalf of the Admiralty Earnshaw's chronometer no. 1503 at a price of 40 Guineas for an expedition he was to command in HMS Providence to transport breadfruit plants from Tahiti to the West Indies. This was the second expedition that Bligh had undertaken with this mission. The first expedition was with HMS Bounty which had ended in the infamous mutiny led by Fletcher Christian and from which Bligh returned to England only with the greatest of difficulties. The second expedition, however, was entirely successful.

Around 1796 Earnshaw, who had temporarily lost interest in the Board of Longitude reward, was tempted back by the failure of Josiah Emery to win it. Earnshaw had a low opinion of Emery's chronometers and claimed that an already existing chronometer of his, no. 265, could outperform Emery's even though it had just returned from a voyage to the West Indies and had not been cleaned (dirty oil has an adverse effect on the going of a chronometer). Earnshaw was easily proved right in this and his chronometer had a good average rate over a 12-month trial. However, he failed to win any reward because the method of rating required that the rate of the piece in the first month be used as the baseline for the trial rather than the absolute timekeeping of the instrument. Ironically, this method had originally been proposed by Earnshaw's ally Maskelyne.

In June 1801, Matthew Flinders' ship, HMS Investigator, carried two boxed Timekeepers by Earnshaw E520 and E543, at a cost of 100 Guineas each. Investigator also carried two of Arnled's timekeepers on the first circumnavigation and mapping of the coastline of Australia. The chronometer, E520, was mounted in a wooden box with gimbals to compensate for the motion of the ship. Flinders went to shore regularly to check the settings of the chronometers against the stars. The Earnshaw chronometer was the only one working at the end of the journey, causing Flinders to refer to it in his book A Voyage to Terra Australis as "this excellent timekeeper". Flinders was taken prisoner-of-war by the French in Mauritius. In 1805 Captain Aken, a fellow prisoner, was released and returned to England. Flinders gave him the chronometers to return to the Greenwich Observatory. By some unknown sequence of events, the Earnshaw 520 was sold to an Australian collector and in 1937 became the property of the Museum of Applied Arts and Sciences (Powerhouse Museum) in Sydney. It was not until 1976 that it was identified as the chronometer of Flinders' historic journey.

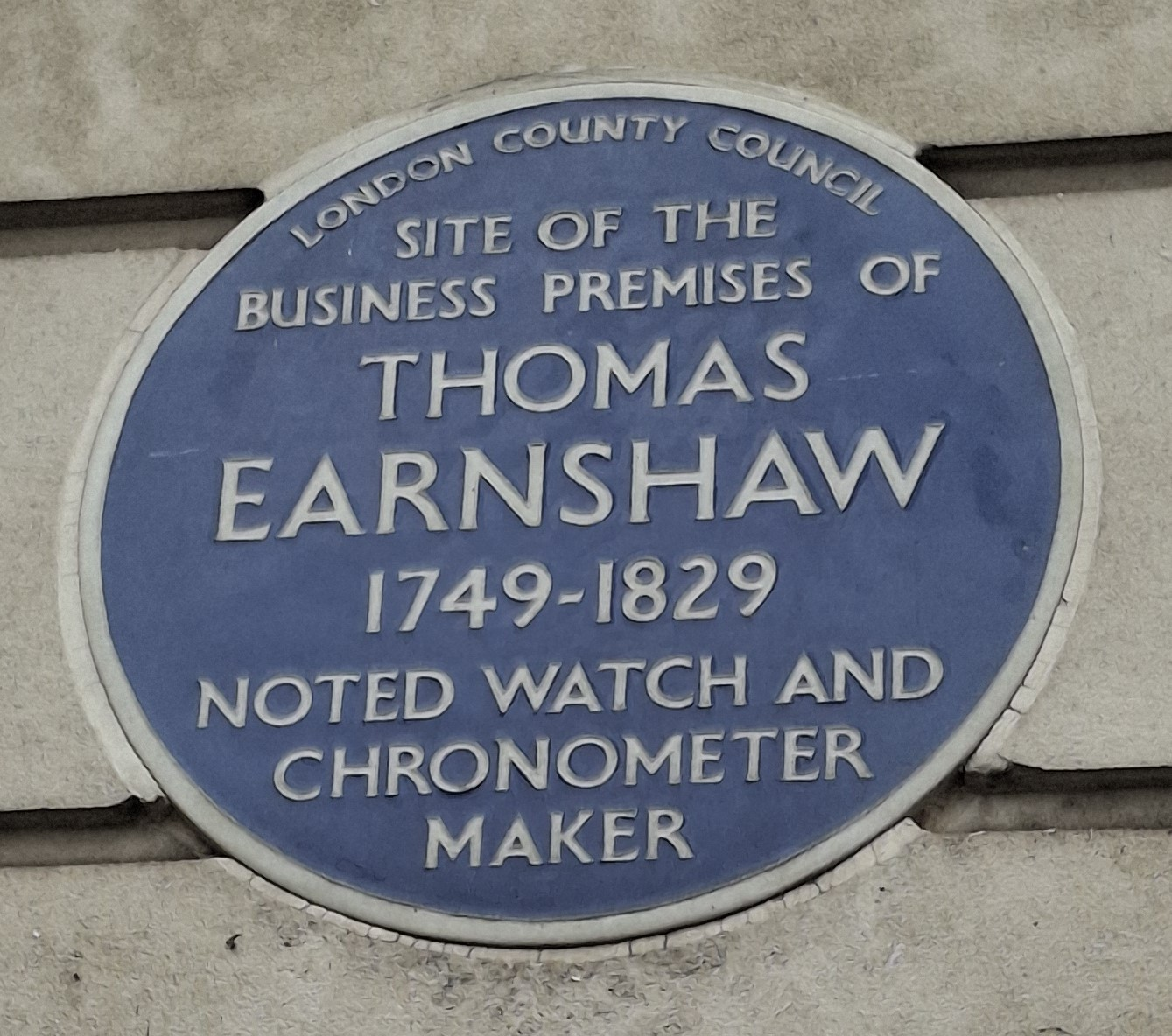
Blue plaque on "Site of the business premises of Thomas Earnshaw 1749-1829 Noted watch and chronometer maker" opposite Holborn tube station entrance on Holborn, London

Between 1831 and 1836, chronometer no. 509 was carried on HMS Beagle on a voyage to circumnavigate the globe and establish, for the first time, a chain of points around the world of accurately-known longitude. The ship was commanded by Captain Robert FitzRoy, a future Vice-Admiral and founder of the Meteorological Office. This was only one of many chronometers carried by the Beagle since great accuracy was required for this task. This was also the voyage that carried Charles Darwin who was afterwards inspired to write his book about the theory of evolution, On the Origin of Species. The chronometer is object 91 in the BBC Radio 4 series A History of the World in 100 Objects.
