= 2023 Central Bedfordshire Council election =

2023 UK local government election

- 4 May 2023

All 63 seats to Central Bedfordshire Council 32 seats needed for a majority

	First party	Second party	Third party
Leader	Adam Zerny	Richard Wenham	Shaun Roberts
Party	Independent	Conservative	Liberal Democrats
Last election	13 seats, 18.3%	41 seats, 43.3%	3 seats, 9.7%
Seats won	27	20	10
Seat change	▲14	▼21	▲7
Popular vote	27,595	22,176	12,645
Percentage	32.7%	26.3%	15.0%
Swing	▲14.4%	▼17.0%	▲5.3%
	Fourth party	Fifth party
Leader	Matthew Brennan	Susan Clinch
Party	Labour	Green
Last election	1 seat, 19.8%	0 seats, 0%
Seats won	5	1
Seat change	▲4	▲1
Popular vote	15,729	5,068
Percentage	18.6%	6.0%
Swing	▼1.2%	▲2.8%
- Winner of each seat at the 2023 Central Bedfordshire Council election
Leader before election
Richard Wenham
Conservative
Leader after election
Adam Zerny
Independent
No overall control

The 2023 Central Bedfordshire Council election took place on 4 May 2023 to elect members of Central Bedfordshire Council in Bedfordshire, England. This was on the same day as other local elections. New ward boundaries increased the number of seats on the council by four.

Ahead of the election, the Conservative administration had frozen council tax at a time when most councils were raising it to cover the increased cost of delivering public services. The extent to which this was the right course of action was debated by the candidates.

The Conservatives lost control of the council, only winning 20 of the 63 seats. They had previously held a majority of the seats on the council since its creation in 2009. Independent candidates won 27 of the seats, with the resulting council being under no overall control. An independent-led administration subsequently formed, with Adam Zerny being appointed leader of the council at the annual meeting on 25 May 2023.

== Summary ==
=== Election result ===
2023 Central Bedfordshire Council election
Party	Candidates	Seats	Gains	Losses	Net gain/loss	Seats %	Votes %	Votes	+/−
Independent	48	27	6	1	▲14	42.9	32.7	27,595	+14.4
Conservative	61	20	1	7	▼21	31.7	26.3	22,176	–17.0
Liberal Democrats	43	10	7	0	▲7	15.9	15.0	12,645	+5.3
Labour	63	5	5	0	▲4	7.9	18.6	15,729	–1.2
Green	21	1	1	0	▲1	1.6	6.0	5,068	+2.8
Reform	6	0	0	0	Steady	0.0	1.3	1,065	N/A
English Democrat	1	0	0	0	Steady	0.0	0.2	133	N/A

== Ward results ==
The Statement of Persons Nominated, which details the candidates standing in each ward, was released by Central Bedfordshire Council following the close of nominations on 5 April 2023.

=== Ampthill ===
Ampthill (3 seats)
Party	Candidate	Votes	%	±%
Independent	Mark Smith*	1,923	47.5	–7.2
Independent	Gary Summerfield	1,513	37.4	N/A
Green	Susan Clinch	1,330	32.9	+2.3
Conservative	Mike Blair*	1,268	31.3	–9.6
Conservative	Stephen Addy	1,197	29.6	–9.9
Conservative	Paul Duckett*	1,092	27.0	–13.1
Green	Julia Jones	906	22.4	N/A
Liberal Democrats	Catherine Brown	572	14.1	–10.7
Labour	Louise Chinnery	485	12.0	+0.5
Labour	Alan Worley	436	10.8	+1.2
Labour	David Short	341	8.4	+1.7
Reform	Maggie Moriondo	149	3.7	N/A
Turnout		4,046	37.2	–1.1
Registered electors		10,888		
Independent hold				
Independent gain from Conservative				
Green gain from Conservative				

=== Arlesey & Fairfield ===
Arlesey & Fairfield (2 seats)
Party	Candidate	Votes	%
Independent	Jodie Chillery	895	39.5
Labour	Nick Andrews	724	32.0
Liberal Democrats	Neil Stevenson	620	27.4
Conservative	Jilleane Brown	458	20.2
Conservative	Ian Dalgarno*	434	19.2
Labour	Tudor Fox	431	19.0
Independent	Nicola Harris*	430	19.0
Turnout		2,263	33.4
Registered electors		6,771	
Labour win (new seat)			
Independent win (new seat)			

=== Aspley and Woburn ===
Aspley and Woburn
Party	Candidate	Votes	%	±%
Independent	John Michael Baker*	1,844	90.4	+11.9
Conservative	Martin Hawkins	103	5.1	–12.2
Labour	Neil Davies	68	3.3	–0.9
Liberal Democrats	James Alan Emm	24	1.2	N/A
Majority		1,741	85.3	
Turnout		2,041	54.9	–2.5
Registered electors		3,713		
Independent hold		Swing	▲12.1	

=== Barton-le-Clay and Silsoe ===
Barton-le-Clay and Silsoe (2 seats)
Party	Candidate	Votes	%
Independent	Anna French	882	37.2
Independent	Liz Childs	879	37.1
Conservative	Joe Irwin	596	25.2
Conservative	Aarron Colin Byng	573	24.2
Liberal Democrats	Jonathan Paxton	403	17.0
Labour	Gemma Widdowfield	376	15.9
Labour	Sanho Lupata	340	14.4
Liberal Democrats	Paul Martin	199	8.4
Reform	Mandy Ellis	97	4.1
Turnout		2,368	37.5
Registered electors		6,314	
Independent win (new seat)			
Independent win (new seat)			

=== Biggleswade East ===
Biggleswade East (2 seats)
Party	Candidate	Votes	%
Independent	Gareth Tranter	769	37.3
Conservative	Grant Fage	676	32.8
Conservative	Mark Foster*	659	31.9
Labour	Andrew Skilton	658	31.9
Independent	Mollie Smy	513	24.9
Labour	George Tookey	428	20.7
Green	Alistair Nelson	140	6.8
Liberal Democrats	Jacob Holland-Lindsay	73	3.5
Turnout		2,064	32.8
Registered electors		6,300	
Independent win (new seat)			
Conservative win (new seat)			

=== Biggleswade West ===
Biggleswade West (3 seats)
Party	Candidate	Votes	%
Independent	Hayley Whitaker*	2,192	62.1
Independent	Steven Watkins*	1,581	44.8
Independent	Paul How	1,325	37.5
Labour	Julian Vaughan	739	20.9
Labour	Natalie Ashton	698	19.8
Labour	Paul Burgin	698	19.8
Conservative	Madeline Russell	692	19.6
Conservative	Ian Bond*	678	19.2
Conservative	Sarju Patel	589	16.7
Liberal Democrats	Tommy Godfrey	179	5.1
Turnout		3,529	34.6
Registered electors		10,195	
Independent win (new seat)			
Independent win (new seat)			
Independent win (new seat)			

=== Caddington ===
Caddington (2 seats)
Party	Candidate	Votes	%	±%
Independent	Vicky Malone	1,394	47.4	N/A
Conservative	Kevin Collins*	1,043	35.5	–13.0
Conservative	Michael Stott	719	24.4	–18.6
Independent	John Waller	651	22.1	–13.5
Labour	Shirley Smith	421	14.3	–4.6
Labour	Mala Dinsdale	333	11.3	–3.9
Green	Matt Russell	309	10.5	N/A
Liberal Democrats	Eila Goss	289	9.8	N/A
Liberal Democrats	Susan Thorne	145	4.9	N/A
Turnout		2,941	38.2	+1.2
Registered electors		7,706		
Independent gain from Conservative				
Conservative hold				

=== Clifton, Henlow & Langford ===
Clifton, Henlow & Langford (3 seats)
Party	Candidate	Votes	%
Conservative	Drew Richardson	1,680	48.6
Conservative	David Shelvey	1,667	48.2
Conservative	Richard Wenham	1,589	46.0
Labour	Laura Abbott	1,270	36.7
Labour	Kevin O'Daly	1,001	29.0
Labour	Vipulkumar Patel	881	25.5
Green	Linda Fuller	742	21.5
Liberal Democrats	David Mann	647	18.7
Turnout		3,456	30.8
Registered electors		11,203	
Conservative win (new seat)			
Conservative win (new seat)			
Conservative win (new seat)			

=== Cranfield & Marston Moretaine ===
Cranfield & Marston Moretaine (3 seats)
Party	Candidate	Votes	%	±%
Conservative	Sue Clark*	1,406	41.3	–4.0
Independent	Saverlo Bongo	1,312	38.6	N/A
Conservative	Robert Morris*	984	28.9	–6.6
Independent	Alan Victor	925	27.2	N/A
Conservative	Bhaumik Dalal	888	26.1	–12.5
Labour	Elizabeth Rooney	767	22.5	+3.6
Labour	Karl O'Dell	695	20.4	+5.2
Labour	Joel Durojaiye	581	17.1	+4.0
Green	Andrew Tyrtania	507	14.9	–8.3
Independent	Gillian Clough	444	13.1	N/A
Liberal Democrats	Juliet Taylor	425	12.5	N/A
Reform	Norman Maclean	176	5.2	N/A
Turnout		3,402	29.4	–1.3
Registered electors		11,584		
Conservative hold				
Independent gain from Conservative				
Conservative hold				

=== Dunstable Central ===
Dunstable Central
Party	Candidate	Votes	%	±%
Conservative	Carole Hegley*	368	36.4	–18.1
Labour	Gregory Alderman	351	34.7	+7.1
Independent	Andy Palmer	221	21.9	N/A
Liberal Democrats	David Jones	71	7.0	–10.9
Majority		17	1.7	
Turnout		1,019	28.0	–1.5
Registered electors		3,641		
Conservative hold		Swing	▼12.6	

=== Dunstable East ===
Dunstable East (2 seats)
Party	Candidate	Votes	%
Independent	John Gurney	716	35.0
Independent	Kenson Gurney	565	27.6
Conservative	Gloria Martin	536	26.2
Labour	Gemma Russell	490	24.0
Labour	Shafi Kottadan	473	23.1
Conservative	Jay Patel	393	19.2
Independent	Louise O'Riordan	316	15.5
Liberal Democrats	Richard Hunt	180	8.8
Liberal Democrats	Rita Egan	154	7.5
Turnout		2,044	27.0
Registered electors		7,559	
Independent gain from Conservative			
Independent gain from Conservative			

=== Dunstable North ===
Dunstable North (2 seats)
Party	Candidate	Votes	%
Labour	Matthew Brennan	647	39.6
Labour	Matthew Neall	524	32.1
Conservative	Johnson Tamara*	492	30.1
Conservative	John Kane	469	28.7
Independent	Bev Coleman	381	23.3
Independent	Alan Corkhill	261	16.0
Green	Paul Hundal	110	6.7
Liberal Democrats	Elaine Morgan	103	6.3
Liberal Democrats	Ken Wattingham	63	3.9
Turnout		1,632	22.7
Registered electors		7,206	
Labour gain from Conservative			
Labour gain from Conservative			

=== Dunstable South ===
Dunstable South
Party	Candidate	Votes	%
Conservative	Philip Crawley*	290	30.5
Independent	Nicholas Kotarski	288	30.3
Labour	Sally Kimondo	266	28.0
Liberal Democrats	Pat Larkman	106	11.2
Turnout		955	26.7
Registered electors		3,572	
Conservative hold			

=== Dunstable West ===
Dunstable West (2 seats)
Party	Candidate	Votes	%
Conservative	Eugene Ghent*	893	39.9
Conservative	Nigel Young	819	36.6
Independent	Richard Attwell	697	31.1
Labour	Roger Pepworth	526	23.5
Independent	Khaleel Morrison	439	19.6
Labour	Philip Crooks	462	20.6
Liberal Democrats	Elizabeth Owen	251	11.2
Liberal Democrats	Ian Witherick	195	8.7
Turnout		2,240	31.1
Registered electors		7,211	
Conservative hold			
Conservative hold			

=== Eaton Bray ===
Eaton Bray
Party	Candidate	Votes	%	±%
Conservative	Philip Spicer*	693	63.3	–5.5
Green	Dominic Scholfield	209	19.1	–4.1
Labour	Keith Faulkner	193	17.6	+9.6
Majority		484	43.6	
Turnout		1,107	33.1	–1.7
Registered electors		3,343		
Conservative hold		Swing	▲0.7	

=== Flitwick ===
Flitwick (3 seats)
Party	Candidate	Votes	%	±%
Independent	Gareth Mackey*	2,248	57.9	+18.7
Independent	Heather Townsend	1,785	45.9	N/A
Conservative	Ian Adams	1,138	34.4	+1.1
Conservative	Neil Bunyan*	1,090	28.1	–13.0
Conservative	Tim Parsons	854	22.0	–9.4
Labour	Chris Yates	698	18.0	+1.1
Labour	Nick London	493	12.7	–3.2
Labour	Klaus Dudas	469	12.1	–3.1
Green	Kai Roberts	429	11.0	N/A
Green	Robert Harley	292	7.5	N/A
Green	Leisa Milne	252	6.5	N/A
Liberal Democrats	Andrea Kidd	209	5.4	–10.1
Reform	Russ Shaw	192	4.9	N/A
Liberal Democrats	Alan White	147	3.8	–11.0
Turnout		3,885	36.9	+2.9
Registered electors		10,535		
Independent hold				
Independent gain from Conservative				
Conservative hold				

=== Heath & Reach ===
Heath & Reach
Party	Candidate	Votes	%	±%
Conservative	Mark Versallion*	782	59.7	–15.5
Labour	Christine Sheppard	209	16.0	+6.3
Liberal Democrats	Rhiannon Leaman	143	10.9	N/A
Reform	Harry Palmer	121	9.2	N/A
Green	Sebastien Hine	54	4.1	–11.0
Majority		573	43.7	
Turnout		1,311	37.9	–2.2
Registered electors		3,461		
Conservative hold		Swing	▼10.9	

=== Houghton Conquest & Haynes ===
Houghton Conquest & Haynes
Party	Candidate	Votes	%	±%
Independent	Rebecca Hares*	628	56.7	+14.7
Conservative	Mark Smith	233	21.0	–13.1
Labour	Keith Brown	149	13.5	+1.8
Liberal Democrats	Paul Forster	49	4.4	N/A
Green	Penny Hartley	48	4.3	N/A
Majority		395	35.7	
Turnout		1,113	30.6	–8.6
Registered electors		3,663		
Independent hold		Swing	▲13.9	

=== Houghton Regis East ===
Houghton Regis East (3 seats)
Party	Candidate	Votes	%
Independent	Pat Hamill*	730	39.8
Independent	Tracey McMahon	619	33.8
Labour	Chloe Alderman	563	30.7
Labour	Andrew Green	466	25.4
Labour	Sam Russell	463	25.3
Independent	Jan Cooper	434	23.7
Liberal Democrats	Laura Ellaway	366	20.0
Liberal Democrats	Debra Taylor	345	18.8
Liberal Democrats	Marion Rolfe	296	16.2
Conservative	Nicola Hampton-Daly	239	13.0
Conservative	Nigel Warren	201	11.0
Green	Gillia Patrick	121	6.6
Turnout		1,832	22.0
Registered electors		8,343	
Independent win (new seat)			
Independent win (new seat)			
Labour win (new seat)			

=== Houghton Regis West ===
Houghton Regis West (2 seats)
Party	Candidate	Votes	%
Liberal Democrats	Susan Goodchild*	498	38.0
Liberal Democrats	Yvonne Farrell*	392	29.9
Labour	Wendy Bater	341	26.0
Labour	Alex Butler	292	22.3
Conservative	Olga Krupski	228	17.4
Independent	Jimmy Carroll	190	14.5
Independent	Michelle Herber	185	14.1
Conservative	Vera Nnadozie	182	13.9
Green	Catherine Aganoglu	103	7.9
Turnout		1,311	20.9
Registered electors		6,260	
Liberal Democrats hold			
Liberal Democrats hold			

=== Leighton Linslade North ===
Leighton Linslade North (3 seats)
Party	Candidate	Votes	%
Liberal Democrats	David Bligh	1,285	39.8
Liberal Democrats	Kevin Pughe	1,271	39.4
Liberal Democrats	Nigel Carnell	1,200	37.2
Labour	Mike Bishop	976	30.2
Conservative	Steve Jones	956	29.6
Labour	Patrick Carberry	920	28.5
Conservative	Tony Morris	911	28.2
Labour	Jane Woodman	876	27.1
Conservative	Ewan Wallace	864	26.8
English Democrat	Antonio Vitiello	133	4.1
Turnout		3,228	29.5
Registered electors		10,941	
Liberal Democrats gain from Conservative			
Liberal Democrats gain from Conservative			
Liberal Democrats gain from Conservative			

=== Leighton Linslade South ===
Leighton Linslade South (3 seats)
Party	Candidate	Votes	%
Liberal Democrats	Emma Holland-Lindsay	2,355	60.6
Liberal Democrats	Chris Leaman	2,211	56.9
Liberal Democrats	Shaun Roberts	2,146	55.2
Conservative	Amanda Dodwell*	696	17.9
Conservative	Ray Berry*	652	16.8
Labour	Graham Marsden	577	14.8
Conservative	Branko Bjelobaba	566	14.6
Labour	Clive Betts	539	13.9
Labour	Daniel Scott	537	13.8
Independent	June Tobin	422	10.9
Independent	Sarah Cursons	387	10.0
Turnout		3,889	35.5
Registered electors		10,949	
Liberal Democrats gain from Conservative			
Liberal Democrats gain from Conservative			
Liberal Democrats gain from Conservative			

=== Leighton Linslade West ===
Leighton Linslade West (3 seats)
Party	Candidate	Votes	%
Independent	Victoria Harvey*	1,786	42.8
Liberal Democrats	Steve Owen	1,756	42.0
Liberal Democrats	Russ Goodchild	1,583	37.9
Liberal Democrats	Joseph Worrall	1,021	24.4
Conservative	Julian Gallie	942	22.6
Labour	Benjamin Bowles	939	22.5
Labour	Kieran Roan	888	21.3
Conservative	Adam Fahn	862	20.6
Labour	Beverley McBain	838	20.1
Independent	Ryan Battams	618	14.8
Turnout		4,177	39.8
Registered electors		10,486	
Independent hold			
Liberal Democrats gain from Conservative			
Liberal Democrats hold			

=== Meppershall & Shillington ===
Meppershall & Shillington
Party	Candidate	Votes	%
Conservative	Blake Stephenson	778	55.8
Labour	Glenda Tizard	239	17.1
Reform	Dave Holland	165	11.8
Liberal Democrats	Ray Morgan	123	8.8
Independent	Ian Shingler*	89	6.3
Majority		539	38.7
Turnout		1,403	37.5
Registered electors		3,746	
Conservative win (new seat)			

=== Northill ===
Northill
Party	Candidate	Votes	%	±%
Conservative	Paul Daniels	676	47.4	–31.6
Independent	Simon Sheridan	541	37.9	N/A
Labour	Andrew Harland	210	14.7	–6.3
Majority		135	9.5	
Turnout		1,432	39.3	+3.3
Registered electors		3,644		
Conservative hold		Swing	N/A	

=== Potton ===
Potton (2 seats)
Party	Candidate	Votes	%	±%
Independent	Adam Zerny*	2,296	84.0	–1.8
Independent	Tracey Wye*	1,908	69.8	+2.2
Conservative	Suzanne Worboys	288	10.5	–3.3
Conservative	Robert Pullinger	272	9.9	–1.9
Green	Rebecca Beattie	216	7.9	N/A
Labour	Rhiannon Barrow	163	6.0	+0.8
Labour	Robert Cheesewright	109	4.0	+0.8
Turnout		2,734	39.7	–10.4
Registered electors		6,889		
Independent hold				
Independent hold				

=== Sandy ===
Sandy (3 seats)
Party	Candidate	Votes	%	±%
Independent	Simon Ford*	2,124	62.2	+3.3
Independent	Sue Bell	1,325	38.8	N/A
Independent	Robert Pashby	1,124	32.9	N/A
Conservative	Caroline Maudlin*	1,018	29.8	–1.7
Liberal Democrats	Nigel Aldis	831	24.3	–3.0
Conservative	Joanna Hewitt	802	23.5	–5.2
Conservative	Morgan Gilling	589	17.2	–6.3
Labour	Andy King	586	17.2	+8.5
Labour	Wendy Mott	425	12.4	+4.7
Labour	Matthew Yardley	339	9.9	+2.5
Turnout		3,415	34.3	–2.9
Registered electors		9,971		
Independent hold				
Independent gain from Conservative				
Independent gain from Conservative				

=== Shefford ===
Shefford (2 seats)
Party	Candidate	Votes	%	±%
Conservative	Mark Liddiard*	918	47.6	–18.1
Conservative	Tony Brown*	907	47.0	–18.4
Labour	Jack Risbridger	752	39.0	+8.3
Labour	John Tizard	747	38.7	+13.7
Liberal Democrats	Jack Moore	315	16.3	N/A
Turnout		1,929	29.3	+0.3
Registered electors		6,595		
Conservative hold				
Conservative hold				

=== Stotfold ===
Stotfold (2 seats)
Party	Candidate	Votes	%
Independent	Kathryn Woodfine	1,348	55.4
Labour	Helen Wightwick	743	30.5
Conservative	Steven Dixon*	604	24.8
Labour	Satinderjit Dhaliwal	569	23.4
Conservative	Josie Richardson	527	21.7
Liberal Democrats	Rachel McGann	386	15.9
Turnout		2,433	33.9
Registered electors		7,181	
Independent win (new seat)			
Labour win (new seat)			

=== Toddington ===
Toddington (2 seats)
Party	Candidate	Votes	%	±%
Independent	Mary Walsh*	1,418	57.4	+14.4
Conservative	Gary Purser	716	29.0	+2.1
Green	Steven Winslet	618	25.0	N/A
Conservative	Shahid Akhter	562	22.8	+3.4
Labour	Maggie Herod	467	18.9	+3.6
Labour	Connell Owen	326	13.2	+0.9
Liberal Democrats	Miranda Roberts	313	12.7	N/A
Turnout		2,469	33.2	–7.0
Registered electors		7,433		
Independent hold				
Conservative gain from Independent				

=== Westoning, Flitton & Greenfield ===
Westoning, Flitton & Greenfield
Party	Candidate	Votes	%	±%
Conservative	James Jamieson*	793	54.7	–16.6
Independent	Ekta Bhasin	261	18.0	N/A
Green	Gareth Ellis	186	12.8	–9.3
Labour	Nick Hickman	136	9.4	+2.9
Liberal Democrats	Drew Bowater	73	5.0	N/A
Majority		532	36.6	
Turnout		1,453	39.4	–3.4
Registered electors		3,692		
Conservative hold		Swing	N/A	

== Changes 2023–2027 ==
=== Affiliation changes ===
Leighton-Linslade West councillor Steve Owen left the Liberal Democrats to sit as an independent on 19 June 2023, accusing the party of "censorship".

Fellow Leighton-Linslade West councillor Russ Goodchild left the Liberal Democrats to sit as an independent on 11 November 2024, saying his former colleagues had abandoned their 2023 election pledges on town centre regeneration.

Houghton Regis East councillor Pat Hamill left the Independent Alliance in March 2025 and joined Reform UK, confirmed by the party on 9 May 2025.

=== By-elections ===
==== Stotfold ====
Stotfold by-election: 11 September 2025
Party	Candidate	Votes	%	±%
Reform	Marion Mason	823	30.8	N/A
Conservative	Ian Dalgarno	559	20.9	−3.9
Labour	Rachel Burgin	532	19.9	–10.6
Green	Katie Hill-Lines	416	15.6	N/A
Liberal Democrats	Neil Stevenson	339	12.7	−3.2
Majority		264	9.9	N/A
Turnout		2,680	35.7	+1.8
Registered electors		7,511		
Reform gain from Labour				
