= Mid Bedfordshire (constituency) =

Parliamentary constituency in the United Kingdom, 1918 onwards

Coordinates: 52.027°N 0.383°W

- County constituency for the House of Commons
- Interactive map of boundaries from 2024
- Location within the East of England
- County: Bedfordshire
- Electorate: 71,748 (March 2020)
- Major settlements: Ampthill, Flitwick

Current constituency
- Created: 1918
- Member of Parliament: Blake Stephenson (Conservative)
- Seats: One
- Created from: Luton and Biggleswade
- During its existence contributed to new seat(s) of: North East Bedfordshire (1997)

Mid Bedfordshire is a constituency (Note: A county constituency (for the purposes of election expenses and type of returning officer)) represented in the House of Commons of the UK Parliament by Blake Stephenson of the Conservative Party since the 2024 United Kingdom general election. (Note: As with all constituencies, the constituency elects one Member of Parliament (MP) by the first past the post system of election at least every five years.)

== Constituency profile ==
Mid Bedfordshire is a constituency in Bedfordshire. Its largest settlement is the town of Flitwick, which has a population of around 14,000. Other settlements in the constituency include the small towns of Ampthill and Wixams and the villages of Barton-le-Clay, Toddington, Silsoe, Marston Moreteyne, Cranfield and Wootton.

This is a mostly rural constituency covering the areas between Bedford, Luton and Milton Keynes. It is well-connected by road and rail to the nearby large towns and cities and also to London, which lies around 40 miles (64 km) to the south. The area thus houses many middle-class commuters. Many of the towns and villages in the constituency have new housing developments; Wixams in particular is a new town that began construction in 2007. Cranfield is known for its airport and its university, a postgraduate institution that specialises in the aerospace industry. The constituency is highly affluent with low levels of deprivation, and house prices are higher than national and regional averages.

In general, residents of Mid Bedfordshire are well-educated and have high rates of homeownership. The average household income is very high and a large proportion of residents work in professional occupations, particularly in the transport and education sectors. Very few residents claim unemployment benefits and the child poverty rate is less than half the national figure. White people made up 89% of the population at the 2021 census.

At the local council level, Mid Bedfordshire is represented by a mixture of independent and Conservative councillors. An estimated 52% of voters in the constituency supported leaving the European Union in the 2016 referendum, identical to the nationwide figure.

== History ==
Mid Bedfordshire was created under the Representation of the People Act 1918.

It had elected Conservative MPs since the 1931 general election. It was held from 1983 to 1997 by the Attorney General Nicholas Lyell, who then transferred to the newly created seat of North East Bedfordshire; his old seat was won by Jonathan Sayeed, a former MP in Bristol. Sayeed was forced to retire in 2005 due to ill health, following a row over allegations he had profited from his private educational tours of Parliament and a resulting deselection attempt by the constituency party. Nadine Dorries then held the seat until 2023; the Conservative whip was withdrawn from her in 2012 and returned six months later, after she had appeared on the reality television series I'm a Celebrity...Get Me Out of Here!. Dorries resigned her seat in August 2023. In the ensuing by-election, the seat was taken by Alistair Strathern of the Labour Party, the first time a Labour member had held the seat in its 105-year history. In the 2024 United Kingdom general election the seat was regained by the Conservatives, now represented by Blake Stephenson. Incumbent MP Alistair Strathern had stood in Hitchin instead and was successfully elected there, which brought in some wards from Mid Bedfordshire in boundary changes.

== Boundaries and boundary changes ==
=== Historic ===
==== 1918–1950 ====
The constituency was created as a Division of Bedfordshire by the Representation of the People Act 1918, comprising:

- the Urban Districts of Ampthill, Biggleswade, and Leighton Buzzard; and
- the Rural Districts of Ampthill, Biggleswade, and Eaton Bray.

Ampthill and Biggleswade had been part of the abolished Biggleswade Division, and Leighton Buzzard was transferred from the Luton Division.

==== 1950–1974 ====
- The Urban Districts of Ampthill, Biggleswade, and Sandy^{1};
- the Rural Districts of Ampthill and Biggleswade; and
- part of the Rural District of Bedford.

^{1}Created as an Urban District out of the Rural District of Biggleswade in 1927.

Gained southern and eastern rural areas of Bedford. Leighton Buzzard and surrounding rural areas (equivalent to the abolished Rural District of Eaton Bray, which had been absorbed by the Rural District of Luton) transferred to the new constituency of South Bedfordshire.

==== 1974–1983 ====
As above, apart from changes to the Rural District of Bedford.

The village of Eaton Socon had been absorbed by the Urban District of St Neots and was transferred to the county constituency of Huntingdonshire.

==== 1983–1997 ====
- The District of Mid Bedfordshire wards of Ampthill, Arlesey, Biggleswade Ivel, Biggleswade Stratton, Blunham, Campton and Meppershall, Clifton and Henlow, Clophill, Haynes and Houghton Conquest, Langford, Maulden, Northill, Old Warden and Southill, Potton, Sandy All Saints, Sandy St Swithun's, Shefford, Shillington and Stondon, Stotfold, Wensley, and Wrest; and
- The Borough of North Bedfordshire wards of Eastcotts, Great Barford, Kempston East, Kempston Rural, Kempston West, Wilshamstead, and Wootton.

Kempston transferred from the abolished constituency of Bedford. Parts included in the new constituencies of North Bedfordshire (far north-eastern area), South West Bedfordshire (south-western parts) and North Luton (including Flitwick).

==== 1997–2010 ====
- The Borough of Bedford wards of Kempston Rural, Wilshamstead, and Wootton;
- The District of Mid Bedfordshire wards of Ampthill, Aspley Guise, Campton and Meppershall, Cranfield, Clifton and Henlow, Clophill, Flitton and Pulloxhill, Flitwick East, Flitwick West, Harlington, Haynes and Houghton Conquest, Marston, Maulden, Shefford, Shillington and Stondon, Westoning, Woburn, and Wrest; and
- The District of South Bedfordshire wards of Barton-le-Clay, Streatley, and Toddington.

Wholesale changes, with eastern parts, comprising about half of the electorate, including Biggleswade and Sandy, being transferred to the new constituency of North East Bedfordshire. Kempston was transferred back to the re-established borough constituency of Bedford. Regained parts of the District of Mid Bedfordshire previously transferred to South West Bedfordshire and North Luton (including Flitwick), together with the parts of the District of South Bedfordshire, also previously in North Luton.

==== 2010–2024 ====
Map of boundaries 2010–2024

- The Borough of Bedford wards of Turvey, Wilshamstead, and Wootton;
- Central Bedfordshire wards of Ampthill, Aspley Guise, Barton-le-Clay, Clifton and Meppershall, Cranfield, Flitton, Greenfield and Pulloxhill, Flitwick East, Flitwick West, Harlington, Houghton, Haynes, Southill and Old Warden, Marston, Maulden and Clophill, Shefford, Campton and Gravenhurst, Shillington, Silsoe, Stondon and Henlow Camp, Streatley, Toddington, Westoning and Tingrith, Woburn.

Marginal changes due to revision of local authority wards.

=== Current ===
Further to the 2023 review of Westminster constituencies, which came into effect for the 2024 general election, the composition of the constituency was defined as follows (as they existed on 1 December 2020):

- The Borough of Bedford wards of: Elstow and Stewartby; Wilshamstead; Wootton.
- The District of Central Bedfordshire wards of: Ampthill; Aspley and Woburn; Barton-le-Clay; Cranfield and Marston Moretaine; Flitwick; Houghton Conquest and Haynes; Silsoe and Shillington; Toddington; Westoning, Flitton and Greenfield.

Eastern areas, including the town of Shefford, were transferred out to the re-established, cross-county boundary constituency of Hitchin.

Following further local government boundary reviews in Bedford and Central Bedfordshire which came into effect in May 2023, the constituency now comprises the following from the 2024 general election:

- The Borough of Bedford wards of: Cauldwell (small part); Wixhams & Wilstead; Wootton & Kempston Rural (Wootton parish).
- The District of Central Bedfordshire wards of: Ampthill; Aspley & Woburn; Barton-le-Clay & Silsoe; Cranfield & Marston Moretaine; Flitwick; Houghton Conquest & Haynes; Meppershall & Shillington (Gravenhurst and Shillington parishes); Toddington; Westoning, Flitton & Greenfield.

== Members of Parliament ==
Luton and Biggleswade prior to 1918

Election	Member	Party	Notes
1918	Max Townley	Conservative	
1922	Frederick Linfield	Liberal	
1924	William Warner	Conservative	
1929	Milner Gray	Liberal	
1931	Alan Lennox-Boyd	Conservative	Secretary of State for the Colonies (1954–1959); Raised to the peerage as Viscount Boyd of Merton
1960 by-election	Stephen Hastings	Conservative	
1983	Nicholas Lyell	Conservative	Contested North East Bedfordshire following redistribution
Constituency split, majority renamed North East Bedfordshire, minority merged with part of Luton North
1997	Jonathan Sayeed	Conservative	Member for Bristol East (1983–1992)
2005	Nadine Dorries	Conservative	Secretary of State for Digital, Culture, Media and Sport (2021–2022)
2023 by-election	Alistair Strathern	Labour	Contested Hitchin in 2024 following redistribution
2024	Blake Stephenson	Conservative	

== Elections ==
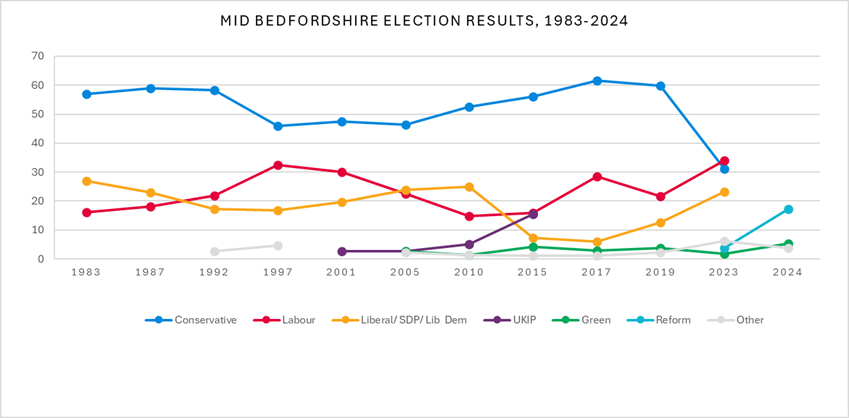
Mid Bedfordshire election results 1983–2024

== Election results 2024–present ==
=== Elections in the 2020s ===
General election 2024: Mid Bedfordshire*
Party	Candidate	Votes	%	±%
Conservative	Blake Stephenson	16,912	34.1	−26.4
Labour	Maahwish Mirza	15,591	31.4	+10.9
Reform	David Holland	8,594	17.3	N/A
Liberal Democrats	Stuart Roberts	4,068	8.2	−4.3
Green	Cade Sibley	2,584	5.2	+1.3
Independent	Gareth Mackey	1,700	3.4	+3.4
SDP	Richard Brunning	172	0.3	+0.3
Majority		1,321	2.7	−36.7
Turnout		49,621	65.1	−6.4
Registered electors		76,218		
Conservative hold		Swing	−18.6	

* Vote share changes compared to the 2019 election, not the 2023 by-election.

2019 notional result
Party	Vote	%
Conservative	31,034	60.5
Labour	10,525	20.5
Liberal Democrats	6,420	12.5
Green	1,998	3.9
Others	1,348	2.6
Turnout	51,325	71.5
Electorate	71,748	

== Election results 1997–2024 ==
=== Elections in the 2020s ===
2023 Mid Bedfordshire by-election*
Party	Candidate	Votes	%	±%
Labour	Alistair Strathern	13,872	34.1	+12.4
Conservative	Festus Akinbusoye	12,680	31.1	−28.7
Liberal Democrats	Emma Holland-Lindsay	9,420	23.1	+10.5
Independent	Gareth Mackey	1,865	4.6	N/A
Reform	Dave Holland	1,487	3.7	N/A
Green	Cade Sibley	732	1.8	−2.0
Monster Raving Loony	Ann Kelly	249	0.6	−0.2
English Democrat	Antonio Vitiello	107	0.3	N/A
CPA	Sid Cordle	101	0.2	N/A
True & Fair Party	Alan Victor	93	0.2	N/A
Heritage	Alberto Thomas	63	0.1	N/A
No description	Prince Ankit Love, Emperor of India	27	0.1	N/A
Mainstream	Chris Rooney	24	0.1	N/A
Majority		1,192	3.0	N/A
Turnout		40,720	44.1	−29.6
Labour gain from Conservative		Swing	+20.5	

* The 2024 boundary changes were not in effect for the by-election.

=== Elections in the 2010s ===
General election 2019: Mid Bedfordshire
Party	Candidate	Votes	%	±%
Conservative	Nadine Dorries	38,692	59.8	−1.8
Labour	Rhiannon Meades	14,028	21.7	−6.7
Liberal Democrats	Rachel McGann	8,171	12.6	+6.6
Green	Gareth Ellis	2,478	3.8	+1.0
Independent	Alan Victor	812	1.3	N/A
Monster Raving Loony	Ann Kelly	536	0.8	−0.3
Majority		24,664	38.1	+4.9
Turnout		64,717	73.7	−3.0
Conservative hold		Swing	+2.4	

General election 2017: Mid Bedfordshire
Party	Candidate	Votes	%	±%
Conservative	Nadine Dorries	38,936	61.6	+5.5
Labour	Rhiannon Meades	17,953	28.4	+12.5
Liberal Democrats	Lisa French	3,798	6.0	−1.2
Green	Gareth Ellis	1,794	2.8	−1.4
Monster Raving Loony	Ann Kelly	667	1.1	+0.6
Majority		20,983	33.2	−7.0
Turnout		63,148	76.7	+5.1
Conservative hold		Swing	−3.5	

General election 2015: Mid Bedfordshire
Party	Candidate	Votes	%	±%
Conservative	Nadine Dorries	32,544	56.1	+3.6
Labour	Charlynne Pullen	9,217	15.9	+1.1
UKIP	Nigel Wickens	8,966	15.4	+10.3
Liberal Democrats	Linda Jack	4,193	7.2	−17.7
Green	Gareth Ellis	2,462	4.2	+2.8
Independent	Tim Ireland	384	0.7	N/A
Monster Raving Loony	Ann Kelly	294	0.5	N/A
Majority		23,327	40.2	+12.6
Turnout		58,060	71.6	−0.6
Conservative hold		Swing	+1.3	

In June 2015 the independent candidate, Tim Ireland, lodged an unsuccessful election petition accusing Nadine Dorries of breaches of section 106 of the Representation of the People Act 1983 by making false statements about his character. The petition was dismissed by the courts on 30 July 2015.

General election 2010: Mid Bedfordshire
Party	Candidate	Votes	%	±%
Conservative	Nadine Dorries	28,815	52.5	+5.9
Liberal Democrats	Linda Jack	13,663	24.9	+1.4
Labour	David Reeves	8,108	14.8	−7.7
UKIP	Bill Hall	2,826	5.1	+2.4
Green	Malcolm Bailey	773	1.4	−1.2
English Democrat	John Cooper	712	1.3	N/A
Majority		15,152	27.6	+5.1
Turnout		54,897	72.2	+3.5
Conservative hold		Swing	+2.3	

=== Elections in the 2000s ===
General election 2005: Mid Bedfordshire
Party	Candidate	Votes	%	±%
Conservative	Nadine Dorries	23,345	46.3	−1.1
Liberal Democrats	Mark Chapman	11,990	23.8	+4.1
Labour	Martin Lindsay	11,351	22.5	−7.6
UKIP	Richard Joselyn	1,372	2.7	0.0
Green	Ben Foley	1,292	2.6	N/A
Veritas	Howard Martin	769	1.5	N/A
Independent	Saqhib Ali	301	0.6	N/A
Majority		11,355	22.5	+5.2
Turnout		50,420	68.3	+2.4
Conservative hold		Swing	−2.6	

General election 2001: Mid Bedfordshire
Party	Candidate	Votes	%	±%
Conservative	Jonathan Sayeed	22,109	47.4	+1.4
Labour	James Valentine	14,043	30.1	−2.4
Liberal Democrats	Graham Mabbutt	9,205	19.7	+2.9
UKIP	Chris Laurence	1,281	2.7	N/A
Majority		8,066	17.3	+3.3
Turnout		46,638	65.9	−13.0
Conservative hold		Swing	+1.9	

=== Elections in the 1990s ===
General election 1997: Mid Bedfordshire
Party	Candidate	Votes	%	±%
Conservative	Jonathan Sayeed	24,176	46.0	−16.4
Labour	Neil Mallett	17,086	32.5	+12.7
Liberal Democrats	Tim J. Hill	8,823	16.8	+1.0
Referendum	Shirley C. Marler	2,257	4.3	N/A
Natural Law	Marek J. Lorys	174	0.3	N/A
Majority		7,090	14.0	−22.4
Turnout		52,516	78.9	−5.5
Conservative hold		Swing	−14.6	

== Election results 1918–1997 ==
=== Elections in the 1990s ===
General election 1992: Mid Bedfordshire
Party	Candidate	Votes	%	±%
Conservative	Nicholas Lyell	40,230	58.2	−0.8
Labour	Richard A. Clayton	15,092	21.8	+3.7
Liberal Democrats	Nikolas Hills	11,957	17.3	−5.6
Liberal	Phil Cottier	1,582	2.3	N/A
Natural Law	Marek J. Lorys	279	0.4	N/A
Majority		25,138	36.4	+0.4
Turnout		69,140	84.4	+5.8
Conservative hold		Swing	−2.3	

=== Elections in the 1980s ===
General election 1987: Mid Bedfordshire
Party	Candidate	Votes	%	±%
Conservative	Nicholas Lyell	37,411	59.0	+2.1
SDP	Nikolas Hills	14,560	23.0	−3.9
Labour	John Heywood	11,463	18.1	+1.9
Majority		22,851	36.0	+6.0
Turnout		63,434	78.6	+1.7
Conservative hold		Swing	+3.0	

General election 1983: Mid Bedfordshire
Party	Candidate	Votes	%	±%
Conservative	Nicholas Lyell	33,042	56.9	
Liberal	Monica Howes	15,661	26.9	
Labour	John Tizard	9,420	16.2	
Majority		17,381	30.0	
Turnout		58,123	76.9	
Conservative hold		Swing		

=== Elections in the 1970s ===
General election 1979: Mid Bedfordshire
Party	Candidate	Votes	%	±%
Conservative	Stephen Hastings	37,724	56.87	
Labour	F.G. Peacock	17,140	25.84	
Liberal	C.A.P. Smout	11,467	17.29	
Majority		20,584	31.03	
Turnout		66,331	81.32	
Conservative hold		Swing		

General election October 1974: Mid Bedfordshire
Party	Candidate	Votes	%	±%
Conservative	Stephen Hastings	26,885	45.70	
Labour	J.E. Crow	17,559	29.85	
Liberal	P.W. Meyer	14,388	24.46	
Majority		9,326	15.85	
Turnout		58,832	78.26	
Conservative hold		Swing		

General election February 1974: Mid Bedfordshire
Party	Candidate	Votes	%	±%
Conservative	Stephen Hastings	28,973	45.28	
Labour	David F. Harrowell	17,862	27.92	
Liberal	P.W. Meyer	17,151	26.80	
Majority		11,111	17.36	
Turnout		63,986	85.87	
Conservative hold		Swing		

General election 1970: Mid Bedfordshire
Party	Candidate	Votes	%	±%
Conservative	Stephen Hastings	29,670	52.51	
Labour	David F Harrowell	19,035	33.69	
Liberal	John P. Christian	7,799	13.80	
Majority		10,635	18.82	
Turnout		56,504	77.28	
Conservative hold		Swing		

=== Elections in the 1960s ===
General election 1966: Mid Bedfordshire
Party	Candidate	Votes	%	±%
Conservative	Stephen Hastings	23,477	46.02	
Labour	C. Trevor Bell	20,369	39.98	
Liberal	Paul L. Rose	7,138	14.01	
Majority		3,078	6.04	
Turnout		50,984	82.29	
Conservative hold		Swing		

General election 1964: Mid Bedfordshire
Party	Candidate	Votes	%	±%
Conservative	Stephen Hastings	22,414	46.03	
Labour	C. Trevor Bell	17,096	35.11	
Liberal	Wilfred G. Matthews	9,184	18.86	
Majority		5,318	10.92	
Turnout		48,694	83.04	
Conservative hold		Swing		

1960 Mid Bedfordshire by-election
Party	Candidate	Votes	%	±%
Conservative	Stephen Hastings	17,503	45.38	−1.41
Labour	Bryan Magee	11,281	29.25	−6.17
Liberal	Wilfred G. Matthews	9,550	24.76	+6.97
New Conservative	C. F. H. Gilliard	235	0.61	N/A
Majority		6,222	16.13	+4.76
Turnout		38,569	71.10	
Conservative hold		Swing		

=== Elections in the 1950s ===
General election 1959: Mid Bedfordshire
Party	Candidate	Votes	%	±%
Conservative	Alan Lennox-Boyd	21,301	46.79	
Labour	Bryan Magee	16,127	35.42	
Liberal	Wilfred G. Matthews	8,099	17.79	N/A
Majority		5,174	11.37	
Turnout		45,527	84.48	
Conservative hold		Swing		

General election 1955: Mid Bedfordshire
Party	Candidate	Votes	%	±%
Conservative	Alan Lennox-Boyd	23,012	54.71	
Labour	Thomas Skeffington-Lodge	19,048	45.29	
Majority		3,964	9.42	
Turnout		42,060	81.36	
Conservative hold		Swing		

General election 1951: Mid Bedfordshire
Party	Candidate	Votes	%	±%
Conservative	Alan Lennox-Boyd	19,681	45.39	
Labour	T.L. 'Addy' Taylor	17,818	41.09	
Liberal	Donald Tweddle	5,863	13.52	
Majority		1,863	4.30	
Turnout		43,362	85.34	
Conservative hold		Swing		

General election 1950: Mid Bedfordshire
Party	Candidate	Votes	%	±%
Conservative	Alan Lennox-Boyd	17,671	41.39	
Labour	W. Howell	15,512	36.33	
Liberal	Ewart Kenneth Martell	9,511	22.28	
Majority		2,159	5.06	
Turnout		42,694	86.22	
Conservative hold		Swing		

=== Elections in the 1940s ===
General election 1945: Bedfordshire Mid
Party	Candidate	Votes	%	±%
Conservative	Alan Lennox-Boyd	13,954	37.0	−13.3
Labour	W Howell	12,073	32.1	+18.9
Liberal	Ewart Kenneth Martell	11,641	30.9	−5.5
Majority		1,881	5.0	−8.9
Turnout		37,668	73.19	−3.10
Conservative hold		Swing		

General Election 1939–40: Another General Election was required to take place before the end of 1940. The political parties had been making preparations for an election to take place from 1939 and by the end of this year, the following candidates had been selected;

- Conservative: Alan Lennox-Boyd
- Labour: George Matthews
- Liberal: Dr Leonard T M Gray

=== Election in the 1930s ===
General election 1935: Bedfordshire Mid
Party	Candidate	Votes	%	±%
Conservative	Alan Lennox-Boyd	16,054	50.3	+2.9
Liberal	Milner Gray	11,623	36.4	−6.4
Labour	Thomas Henry Knight	4,224	13.2	+3.4
Majority		4,431	13.89	+9.26
Turnout		31,901	76.29	−2.85
Conservative hold		Swing		

General election 1931: Bedfordshire Mid
Party	Candidate	Votes	%	±%
Conservative	Alan Lennox-Boyd	15,213	47.4	+6.7
Liberal	Milner Gray	13,726	42.8	−4.1
Labour	Henry William Fenner	3,156	9.8	−2.6
Majority		1,487	4.63	N/A
Turnout		32,095	79.14	
Conservative gain from Liberal		Swing		

=== Election in the 1920s ===
General election 30 May 1929: Bedfordshire Mid
Party	Candidate	Votes	%	±%
Liberal	Milner Gray	14,595	46.9	−1.1
Unionist	William Warner	12,682	40.7	−11.3
Labour	Henry William Fenner	3,853	12.4	N/A
Majority		1,913	6.2	N/A
Turnout		31,130	79.5	+3.0
Liberal gain from Unionist		Swing	+5.1	

General election 29 October 1924: Bedfordshire Mid
Party	Candidate	Votes	%	±%
Unionist	William Warner	12,317	52.0	+10.1
Liberal	Frederick Linfield	11,356	48.0	−3.0
Majority		961	4.0	N/A
Turnout		23,673	76.5	+3.9
Unionist gain from Liberal		Swing		

General election 6 December 1923: Bedfordshire Mid
Party	Candidate	Votes	%	±%
Liberal	Frederick Linfield	11,310	51.0	−5.5
Unionist	William Warner	9,287	41.9	−1.6
Labour	Robert Leonard Wigzell	1,567	7.1	N/A
Majority		2,023	9.1	−3.9
Turnout		22,164	72.6	+2.5
Liberal hold		Swing		

General election 15 November 1922: Bedfordshire Mid
Party	Candidate	Votes	%	±%
Liberal	Frederick Linfield	11,874	56.5	+11.7
Unionist	Max Townley	9,137	43.5	−11.7
Majority		2,737	13.0	N/A
Turnout		21,011	70.1	+15.3
Liberal gain from Unionist		Swing	+11.7	

=== Election in the 1910s ===
General election 14 December 1918: Bedfordshire Mid
Party		Candidate	Votes	%
C	Unionist	Max Townley	9,073	55.2
	Liberal	Arthur Black	7,352	44.8
Majority			1,721	10.4
Turnout			16,425	54.8
	Unionist win (new seat)			
C indicates candidate endorsed by the coalition government.

== See also ==
- List of parliamentary constituencies in Bedfordshire
- List of parliamentary constituencies in the East of England (region)
- Mid Bedfordshire by-election
