= Mid Bedfordshire by-election =

Mid Bedfordshire by-election may refer to:

- 1960 Mid Bedfordshire by-election, following the elevation to the peerage of Alan Lennox-Boyd
- 2023 Mid Bedfordshire by-election, following the resignation of Nadine Dorries
