= Alistair Strathern =

British politician (born 1990)

Alistair Strathern MP
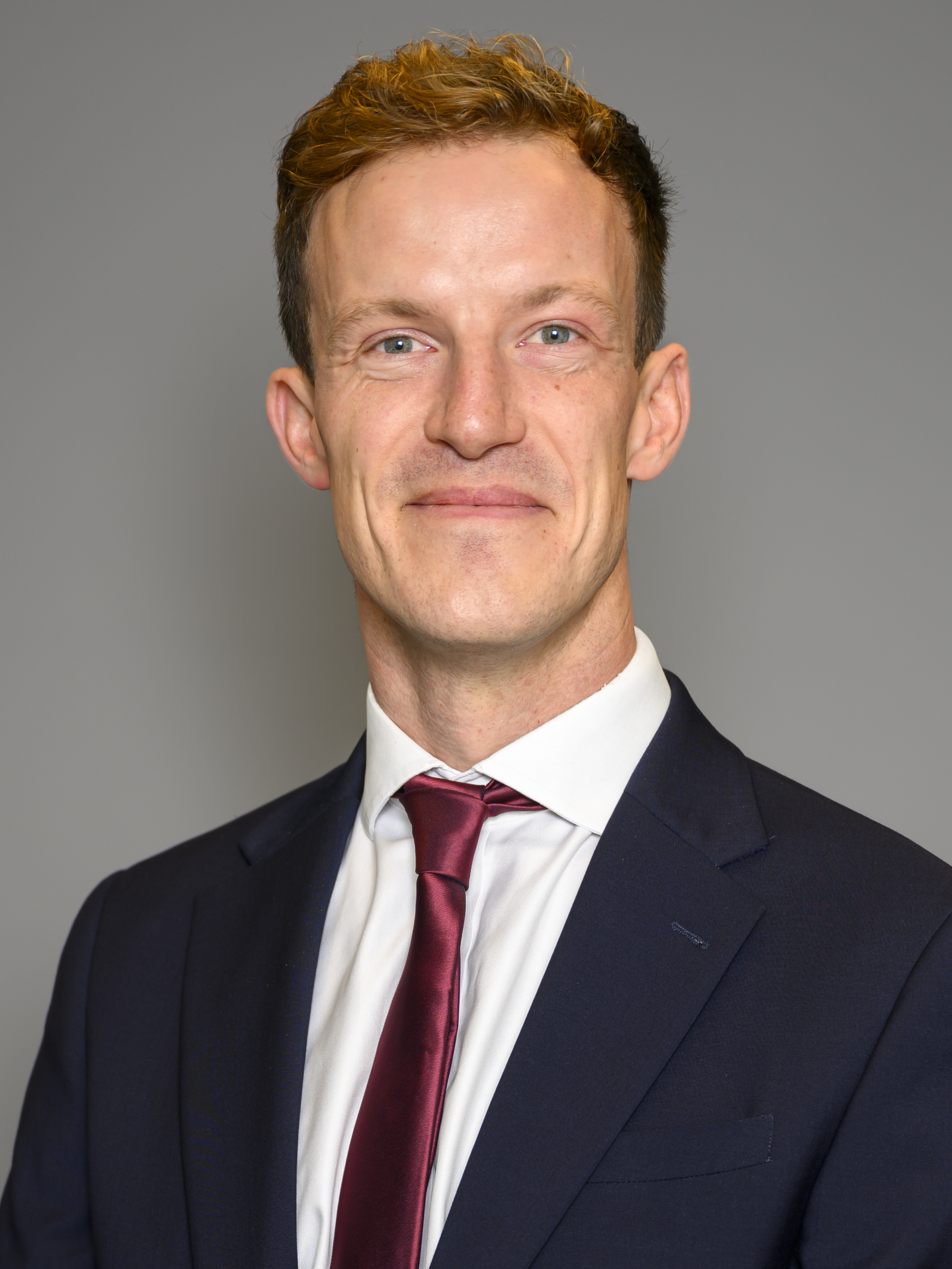
- Official portrait, 2023

Member of Parliament for Hitchin
- Incumbent
- Assumed office 4 July 2024
- Preceded by: Bim Afolami (Hitchin and Harpenden)
- Majority: 8,109 (15.4%)

Member of Parliament for Mid Bedfordshire
- In office 19 October 2023 – 30 May 2024
- Preceded by: Nadine Dorries
- Succeeded by: Blake Stephenson

Member of Waltham Forest Council for Higham Hill
- In office 26 May 2014 – 5 September 2023
- Succeeded by: Shumon Ali-Rahman

Personal details
- Born: Alistair Luke Strathern; 5 March 1990 (age 36)
- Party: Labour
- Domestic partner: Megan Corton Scott
- Relatives: Theresa May (first cousin once removed)
- Education: St Anne's College, Oxford (BA)
- Website: alistairstrathern.com

Alistair Luke Strathern (born 5 March 1990) is a British Labour Party politician who has served as the Member of Parliament (MP) for Hitchin since 2024. He previously served as MP for Mid Bedfordshire after winning a by-election in 2023.

== Early life and education ==
Alistair Strathern was born on 5 March 1990, and grew up in Bedfordshire. He was educated at Sharnbrook Academy in Sharnbrook, before studying philosophy, politics and economics at St Anne's College, Oxford, graduating with a Bachelor of Arts degree. While a student at Oxford, Strathern chaired the Oxford University Labour Club. While still at university, he stood in the 2010 Oxford City Council election for the ward of Holywell, finishing fourth.

== Early career ==
Strathern worked as a mathematics teacher.

After graduating, Strathern was employed by the Bank of England in regulating climate risk insurance.

He was a Labour councillor for the ward of Higham Hill on Waltham Forest London Borough Council from 26 May 2014 until his resignation on 5 September 2023. At Waltham Forest, Strathern held the post of "Cabinet Member for 15-Minute Neighbourhoods". Between 2014 and 2015, he was a director of Ascham Homes Limited, an arms-length management organisation that provided council housing in Waltham Forest.

== Parliamentary career ==
At the 2023 Mid Bedfordshire by-election, Strathern was elected to Parliament as MP for Mid Bedfordshire with 34.1% of the vote and a majority of 1,192. The Guardian described the result as "delivering a significant blow to Rishi Sunak's hopes of holding on to power at the 2024 general election".

In January 2024, Strathern was appointed as Parliamentary private secretary to both the Shadow Chancellor, Rachel Reeves, and Shadow Climate Secretary, Ed Miliband.

Also in January 2024, he announced his intention to contest Hitchin at the 2024 general election, which would include his home in Shefford and other parts of Mid Bedfordshire due to boundary changes. At the general election, Strathern was elected to Parliament as MP for Hitchin with 44.8% of the vote and a majority of 8,109.

== Personal life ==
Strathern has taken part in protests organised by the environmental campaign group Greenpeace, including a stunt carried out in 2022 outside the Home Office by a group opposed to the Public Order Act. His involvement in the protest was revealed some months later, and sparked calls by the defence secretary Grant Shapps for his parliamentary candidacy to be withdrawn. A photograph of Strathern at the protest dressed as a zombie appeared on the front page of The Sun on 8 August 2023, under the headline "Wannabe Labour MP unmasked as 'zombie' Greenpeace zealot". Strathern stated that he does not regret the protest.

Strathern's partner is Megan Corton Scott, the deputy director of Labour Climate and Environment Forum.

Strathern has a lisp, which has become less pronounced with age.

He is a first cousin, once removed, of former Prime Minister Theresa May.

Parliament of the United Kingdom
Preceded by Nadine Dorries	Member of Parliament for Mid Bedfordshire; 2023–2024	Succeeded by Blake Stephenson
Preceded by Bim Afolami	Member of Parliament for Hitchin; 2024–present	Incumbent
