= Nicholas Lyell =

English politician (1938–2010)

The Right Honourable The Lord Lyell of Markyate PC QC

Shadow Attorney General for England and Wales
- In office 2 May 1997 – 19 June 1997
- Leader: John Major
- Preceded by: John Morris
- Succeeded by: Edward Garnier

Attorney General for England and Wales Attorney General for Northern Ireland
- In office 10 April 1992 – 2 May 1997
- Prime Minister: John Major
- Preceded by: Patrick Mayhew
- Succeeded by: John Morris

Solicitor General for England and Wales
- In office 13 June 1987 – 10 April 1992
- Prime Minister: Margaret Thatcher; John Major
- Preceded by: Patrick Mayhew
- Succeeded by: Derek Spencer

Parliamentary Under-Secretary of State for Health and Social Security
- In office 10 September 1986 – 13 June 1987
- Prime Minister: Margaret Thatcher
- Preceded by: John Major
- Succeeded by: Michael Portillo

Member of Parliament for North East Bedfordshire
- In office 1 May 1997 – 14 May 2001
- Preceded by: Constituency established
- Succeeded by: Alistair Burt

Member of Parliament for Mid Bedfordshire
- In office 9 June 1983 – 8 April 1997
- Preceded by: Stephen Hastings
- Succeeded by: Jonathan Sayeed

Member of Parliament for Hemel Hempstead
- In office 3 May 1979 – 13 May 1983
- Preceded by: Robin Corbett
- Succeeded by: Constituency abolished

Member of the House of Lords
- Lord Temporal
- Life peerage 27 June 2005 – 30 August 2010

Personal details
- Born: 6 December 1938 London, England
- Died: 30 August 2010 (aged 71) Berkhamsted, Hertfordshire, England
- Party: Conservative
- Education: Christ Church, Oxford

Nicholas Walter Lyell, Baron Lyell of Markyate, PC, QC (6 December 1938 – 30 August 2010) was a British Conservative Party politician, known for much of his active political career as Sir Nicholas Lyell.

== Early life ==
Born in London, he was the son of Sir Maurice Lyell, a High Court judge, and Veronica Luard, a sculptor and designer whose father, Lowes Dalbiac Luard, had been a contemporary of Augustus John and Walter Sickert. His mother died when he was 11, leaving Lyell and his sister Prue to continue their mother's work to preserve the work of their grandfather.

Educated at Wellesley House School in the coastal town of Broadstairs in Kent and at Stowe School, he was his father's best man when he married the also widowed Kitty, Lady Farrar, younger daughter of Walter Runciman, 1st Viscount Runciman of Doxford. Lyell read modern history at Christ Church, Oxford, where he joined the Bullingdon club, and after National Service with the Royal Artillery trained as a lawyer.

== Legal career ==
Lyell trained with the firm associated with his stepmother's family, Walter Runciman and Co, and was called to the bar at Inner Temple in 1965. He served his pupillage with Gordon Slynn, and after being part of the team that debated a case over the world's first onion-peeling machine, specialised in commercial and public law.

== Political career ==
After unsuccessfully contesting Lambeth Central in October 1974, Lyell was elected Member of Parliament for Hemel Hempstead winning the seat from Labour in 1979, then Mid Bedfordshire from 1983, and moved to North East Bedfordshire at the 1997 election, having been defeated for the nomination by former Bristol MP Jonathan Sayeed in the Mid Bedfordshire constituency.

Lyell was one of very few lawyers to have combined a successful career in Parliament and a major private practice. He was also the longest continuously serving law officer for more than 100 years. After 20 years at the Bar he was appointed Solicitor-General from 1987 to 1992 under Margaret Thatcher, during which time he appeared in the Factortame case, and Attorney General for England and Wales and Northern Ireland under John Major from 1992 to 1997. He was knighted in 1987. He stood down as an MP at the 2001 election.

Commenting on Lyell's retirement as an MP, Conservative Party chairman Michael Ancram said:

Nick Lyell served his country and his party extremely well as attorney general and in a number of other senior roles in the last Conservative Government and he has been a tireless servant of his constituents during his 21 years in Parliament. His presence will be missed by all at Westminster. I am extremely grateful for all the years of service Nick has put in for the Conservative Party and I wish him well in his retirement.

=== Matrix Churchill affair ===
Lyell was at the centre of the Matrix Churchill affair, the controversy to sell arms to Saddam Hussein's Iraq. In 1996, the Scott Report directly criticised Lyell as Attorney General for trying to obtain a "gagging order" to prevent the disclosure of secret documents concerning machine tool and material supply to Baghdad. Prime Minister John Major chose to stand by Lyell.

== Peerage ==
On 13 May 2005, it was announced that he would be created a life peer, and on 27 June 2005 he was created Baron Lyell of Markyate, of Markyate in the County of Hertfordshire.

== Other interests ==
Lyell was a former chairman of the board of Governors of Stowe School, standing down from the role at the end of the 2006–7 academic year. Always interested in the countryside and culture, he was from 2005 Chairman of the Federation of British Artists at the Mall Galleries in London.

Lyell was an underwriting 'Name' at the Lloyd's of London insurance market. He joined in 1974 but suffered enormous losses in the bad years 1989 – 1992 as a result of the Piper Alpha oil rig disaster in 1988 and the tsunami of claims from asbestos-related Mesothelioma personal injury. His losses have variously been estimated to be between £622,591 and £2,000,000; he underwrote on numerous syndicates.

== Personal life ==
Lyell was married to Susanna Fletcher, granddaughter of Lord Mottistone, the couple had two sons and two daughters. Lyell died in the Hospice of St Francis in Berkhamsted, Hertfordshire after a 12-year battle with cancer on 30 August 2010.

Parliament of the United Kingdom
Preceded by Robin Corbett	Member of Parliament for Hemel Hempstead; 1979–1983	Constituency abolished
Preceded by Stephen Hastings	Member of Parliament for Mid Bedfordshire; 1983–1997	Succeeded by Jonathan Sayeed
New constituency	Member of Parliament for North East Bedfordshire; 1997–2001	Succeeded by Alistair Burt
Political offices
Preceded by Patrick Mayhew	Solicitor General for England and Wales; 1987–1992	Succeeded by Derek Spencer
Preceded by Patrick Mayhew	Attorney General for England and Wales; 1992–1997	Succeeded by John Morris
Preceded by Patrick Mayhew	Attorney General for Northern Ireland; 1992–1997	Succeeded by John Morris
Preceded by The Lord Morris of Aberavon	Shadow Attorney General; 1997	Succeeded by Edward Garnier
