= North East Bedfordshire =

UK Parliament constituency (1997–2024)

Coordinates: 52.221°N 0.574°W

- Former county constituency for the House of Commons
- Boundary of North East Bedfordshire in Bedfordshire

- Location of Bedfordshire within England
- County: Bedfordshire
- Electorate: 87,143 (2018)
- Major settlements: Biggleswade and Sandy

1997–2024
- Seats: One
- Created from: Mid Bedfordshire, North Bedfordshire
- Replaced by: North Bedfordshire, Hitchin

North East Bedfordshire was a constituency (Note: A county constituency (for the purposes of election expenses and type of returning officer)) represented in the House of Commons of the Parliament of the United Kingdom from 1997 to 2024. (Note: As with all constituencies, the constituency elects one Member of Parliament (MP) by the first past the post system of election at least every five years.)

Further to the completion of the 2023 Periodic Review of Westminster constituencies, the seat was abolished. Subject to moderate boundary changes, it reverted to the name of North Bedfordshire, first contested at the 2024 general election. South eastern areas, including the communities of Arlesey, Langford and Stotfold, were included in the re-established, cross-county boundary, constituency of Hitchin.

== Constituency profile ==
This is a mainly rural, professional area, with medium level incomes, low unemployment and a low proportion of social housing. The East Coast Main Line runs through the east part of the seat, with several stations connecting to Central London.

== Boundaries and boundary changes ==
Map of boundaries 2010–2024

1997–2010: The District of Mid Bedfordshire wards of Arlesey, Biggleswade Ivel, Biggleswade Stratton, Blunham, Langford, Northill, Old Warden and Southill, Potton, Sandy All Saints, Sandy St Swithun's, Stotfold, and Wensley; and the Borough of Bedford wards of Bromham, Carlton, Clapham, Eastcotts, Felmersham, Great Barford, Harrold, Oakley, Renhold, Riseley, Roxton, and Sharnbrook.

Formed primarily from the eastern half of Mid Bedfordshire, including Biggleswade and Sandy. It also includes rural areas previously in the abolished constituency of North Bedfordshire.

2010–2024: The District of Mid Bedfordshire wards of Arlesey, Biggleswade Holme, Biggleswade Ivel, Biggleswade Stratton, Langford and Henlow Village, Northill and Blunham, Potton and Wensley, Sandy Ivel, Sandy Pinnacle, and Stotfold; and the Borough of Bedford wards of Bromham, Carlton, Clapham, Eastcotts, Great Barford, Harrold, Oakley, Riseley, Roxton, and Sharnbrook.

Marginal loss to Mid Bedfordshire due to revision of local authority wards.

== Members of Parliament ==
Election	Member	Party
1997	Nicholas Lyell	Conservative
2001	Alistair Burt	Conservative
2019	Alistair Burt	Independent (3 September 2019 – 29 October 2019)
2019	Alistair Burt	Conservative
2019	Richard Fuller	Conservative

== Elections ==
=== Elections in the 2010s ===
General election 2019: North East Bedfordshire
Party	Candidate	Votes	%	±%
Conservative	Richard Fuller	38,443	59.1	−1.8
Labour	Julian Vaughan	14,160	21.8	−6.7
Liberal Democrats	Daniel Norton	7,999	12.3	+6.5
Independent	Adam Zerny	2,525	3.9	New
Green	Philippa Fleming	1,891	2.9	+1.0
Majority		24,283	37.3	+4.9
Turnout		65,018	71.7	−1.7
Conservative hold		Swing	+2.4	

General election 2017: North East Bedfordshire
Party	Candidate	Votes	%	±%
Conservative	Alistair Burt	39,139	60.9	+1.4
Labour	Julian Vaughan	18,277	28.5	+12.7
Liberal Democrats	Stephen Rutherford	3,693	5.8	0.0
UKIP	Duncan Strachan	1,896	3.0	−11.6
Green	Philippa Fleming	1,215	1.9	−2.4
Majority		20,862	32.4	−11.3
Turnout		64,220	73.4	+3.2
Conservative hold		Swing	-5.6	

General election 2015: North East Bedfordshire
Party	Candidate	Votes	%	±%
Conservative	Alistair Burt	34,891	59.5	+3.7
Labour	Saqhib Ali	9,247	15.8	−0.3
UKIP	Adrianne Smyth	8,579	14.6	+10.5
Liberal Democrats	Peter Morris	3,418	5.8	−15.9
Green	Mark Bowler	2,537	4.3	New
Majority		25,644	43.7	+9.6
Turnout		58,672	70.2	−1.0
Conservative hold		Swing	+2.0	

General election 2010: North East Bedfordshire
Party	Candidate	Votes	%	±%
Conservative	Alistair Burt	30,989	55.8	+5.9
Liberal Democrats	Mike Pitt	12,047	21.7	+0.9
Labour	Ed Brown	8,957	16.1	−9.1
UKIP	Brian Capell	2,294	4.1	+0.1
BNP	Ian Seeby	1,265	2.3	New
Majority		18,942	34.1	+9.3
Turnout		55,552	71.2	+3.2
Conservative hold		Swing	+3.4	

=== Elections in the 2000s ===
General election 2005: North East Bedfordshire
Party	Candidate	Votes	%	±%
Conservative	Alistair Burt	24,725	49.9	0.0
Labour	Keith White	12,474	25.2	−5.8
Liberal Democrats	Stephen Rutherford	10,320	20.8	+4.4
UKIP	James May	1,986	4.0	+1.3
Majority		12,251	24.7	+5.8
Turnout		49,505	68.0	+3.2
Conservative hold		Swing	+2.9	

General election 2001: North East Bedfordshire
Party	Candidate	Votes	%	±%
Conservative	Alistair Burt	22,586	49.9	+5.6
Labour	Philip Ross	14,009	31.0	−1.6
Liberal Democrats	Dan Rogerson	7,409	16.4	+2.2
UKIP	Rosalind Hill	1,242	2.7	New
Majority		8,577	18.9	+7.2
Turnout		45,246	64.8	−12.4
Conservative hold		Swing	+3.6	

=== Elections in the 1990s ===
General election 1997: North East Bedfordshire
Party	Candidate	Votes	%	±%
Conservative	Nicholas Lyell	22,311	44.3	
Labour	John Lehal	16,428	32.6	
Liberal Democrats	Philip Bristow	7,179	14.2	
Referendum	John Taylor	2,490	4.9	
Ind. Conservative	Frank Foley	1,842	3.7	
Natural Law	Bernard Bence	138	0.3	
Majority		5,883	11.7	
Turnout		50,388	77.2	
Conservative win (new seat)				

== See also ==
- List of parliamentary constituencies in Bedfordshire
