= A Question of Europe =

1975 UK televised debate

External videos
- A Question of Europe
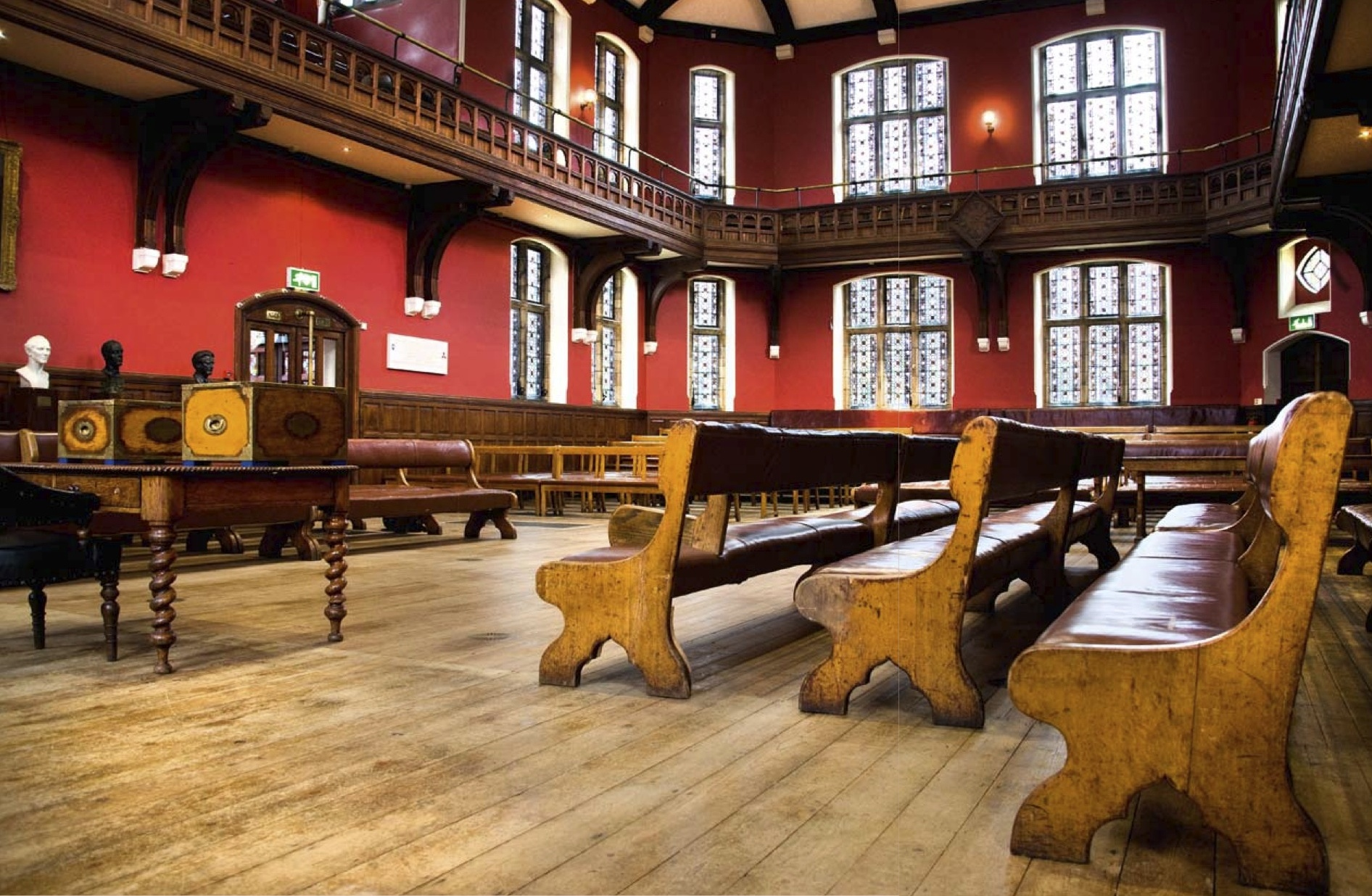
- The Oxford Union debate chamber
- A Question of Europe as broadcast in 1975 on YouTube

A Question of Europe was a televised debate of the Oxford Union held on 3 June 1975. The debate was held two days before the 1975 referendum, in which the electorate were asked if Britain should remain a member of the European Economic Community (EEC) which it had joined in 1973. The statement debated was "that this House would say yes to Europe". Former prime minister Edward Heath and the leader of the Liberal Party Jeremy Thorpe spoke in favour of the motion and Labour ministers Barbara Castle and Peter Shore spoke against it. Heath judged that the audience were largely in favour of the motion anyway and in the vote after the debate, the statement was approved by 493 votes to 92. The debate was broadcast live on BBC1 with an introduction by Robin Day and Ludovic Kennedy; at the end of the programme David Dimbleby provided an update on other developments in the referendum campaign. The result of the 5 June referendum was 67% in favour of remaining within the EEC.

== Background ==
The EEC in 1975

The European Economic Community (EEC), a common market for Western European nations, was founded by the 1957 Treaty of Rome. In 1961 Conservative Prime Minister Harold Macmillan instructed the Lord Privy Seal, Edward Heath to enter negotiations to join the EEC. This was vetoed by French president Charles de Gaulle in 1963. Heath became prime minister in 1970 and, de Gaulle having resigned, resumed his application. Britain joined the EEC in 1973 after the ratification of the Treaty of Accession 1972.

Harold Wilson's Labour Party won the October 1974 United Kingdom general election, with a manifesto promising a referendum on continued British membership of the EEC. Wilson negotiated a number of concessions from the EEC regarding the Common Agricultural Policy, the level of British contribution to the EEC budget, harmonisation of VAT regulations, ongoing Economic and Monetary Union, and the maintenance of parliamentary sovereignty. Wilson announced a referendum on continued British membership of the EEC on 7 January 1975 to be held on 5 June.

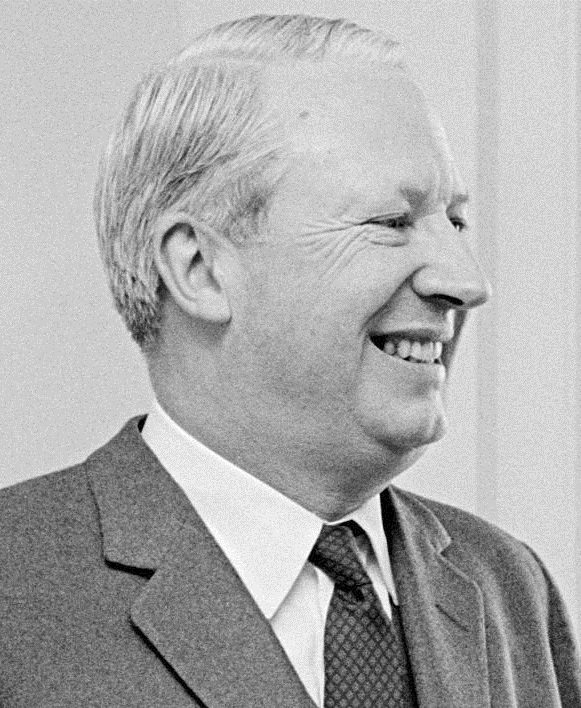
Edward Heath

On 18 March Wilson's cabinet endorsed his renegotiation and the House of Commons voted to support them on 9 April. The Conservative Parliamentary Party largely supported continued membership. Heath was challenged for the leadership of the party in February and lost to future prime minister Margaret Thatcher. Thatcher deliberately played a low-key role in the referendum, regarding Europe as "Ted's issue", Heath therefore played a more prominent role in the pro-EEC Britain in Europe campaign.

The Oxford Union is a debating society associated with Oxford University. It has held formal debates on contemporary and historic matters since the early 19th-century. The debates at this time were organised along formal lines, they followed a quasi-parliamentary procedure and all attendees wore dinner dress. A debate on EEC membership was chosen for 3 June, just two days prior to the referendum. The statement for the debate, that attendees would vote whether to approve, was "that this House would say yes to Europe".

The BBC decided to cover the event live on BBC1 and a slot in the schedule was allocated between 9:35 pm and 11:50 pm. The programme, entitled A Question of Europe, was introduced by Robin Day (who was a former president of the Oxford Union) and Ludovic Kennedy. The BBC's producers were Philip S. Gilbert, Tam Fry and its editor was Michael Townson. The event was anticipated as being one of the most historic to have been held by the Union.

== Debate ==
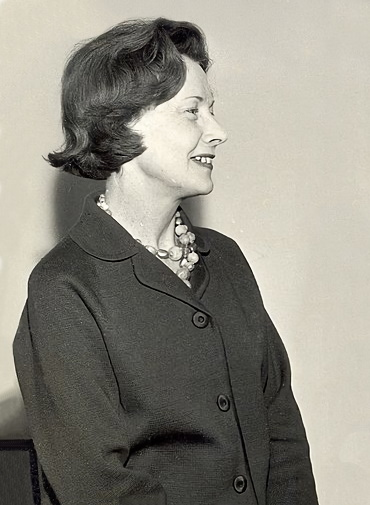
Barbara Castle

Heath and Liberal Party leader Jeremy Thorpe spoke in favour of the statement and Labour Secretary of State for Health and Social Services Barbara Castle and Secretary of State for Trade Peter Shore spoke against it. The debate was preceded by interviews of the speakers by Day and Kennedy and presided over by Oxford Union 1974/75 Trinity term president Victor van Amerongen. There were almost 600 attendees in the Union's debate chamber for the debate, amongst them was future Conservative minister Alistair Burt, then a student at Oxford who attended wearing the stereotyped French dress of a beret, striped shirt, and string of onions. Heath wrote afterwards that he thought that the audience was largely pro-yes.

Heath recalled, at the start of his oratory, that he had taken part in a Union debate as a student in which he opposed the Munich Agreement in the lead up to the Second World War. Heath went on to argue that the EEC was a vital institution to demonstrate that Europe had progressed since the two World Wars and to ensure continued peace. He claimed that Britain would be better able to maintain its sovereignty from within the community than if it were apart from it and questioned how the anti-EEC campaign could claim to support parliamentary sovereignty yet oppose the result of the Commons vote on accession. Heath maintained that a no vote would lead to a "siege economy" with protectionist import and monetary controls. Thorpe questioned how Britain would obtain cheap food supplies if membership was not continued. He described anti-EEC campaigners as a "coalition of 19th-century imperialists and 20th-century Marxists". Thorpe asked that if membership was not continued from where else would the country source affordable food.

Castle described the EEC as too exclusive indirectly citing the then principle of Community preference and that it would compel Britain to provide favourable treatment to its members in all fields, not just trade. She said that the EEC was a step towards creating a European superstate that would be to the detriment of the poorer countries of the world. When Thorpe asked Castle if she would resign if the British public voted to remain a member, she replied that in such circumstances she considered that "my country will need me more than ever". This drew jeers from the crowd and seemed to displease Thorpe and Heath. Castle stated that she expected to lose the vote after the debate, as she considered the Union to be a part of The Establishment. During his speech Shore claimed that the sovereignty of parliament was central to British democracy. He stated that if it remained a member of the EEC the 1957 Treaty of Rome, which founded the organisation, would effectively become Britain's first written constitution and one to which no British citizen had contributed (Britain considered it had an unwritten constitution). He also stated that "the message that comes out [from the yes campaign] is fear, fear, fear. Fear because you won't have any food. Fear of unemployment. Fear that we've somehow been so reduced as a country that we can no longer, as it were, totter about in the world independent as a nation." Roger Berthoud, writing in The Times, commended the standard of Shore's oratory and noted that he received applause even though most of the audience disagreed with his views.

In the post-debate vote the statement "that this House would say yes to Europe" was approved by 493 votes to 92. The speakers and others retired after the event to the Union's President's Room to have drinks with van Amerongen.

The BBC programme was concluded with a summary of other recent events in the referendum campaign presented by David Dimbleby from London. The broadcast reached an audience of almost 11 million people.

== Subsequent events ==
It was generally considered that Heath and Thorpe, who had both previously been presidents of the Union and were familiar with its debates, had performed best. As part of the broadcast commentary Day asked Kennedy what he thought of the applause at the end of Heath's speech; the reply was that it was "very deserved" for a "marvellous speech". Heath stated in his 1998 autobiography that he received letters of congratulations on his performance from actor Kenneth Williams and comedian Dave Allen. Heath also stated that he suspected Castle and Shore later regretted agreeing to take part in the debate. Castle herself wrote on the night of the debate that she thought her performance "a flop" and noted that she "sat down to the thinnest applause of the evening". She praised Heath for the strength of his oratory and genuineness. The debate was referred to as one of the most famous ever held at the Union by Latvian politician Valdis Dombrovskis during a 2018 Oxford Union debate on the statement that "the euro is stronger than ever". Quentin Letts noted in 2017 that Heath's main argument was one of agreement with the European project, rather than economical necessity.

The EEC referendum took place on 5 June 1975 and, on a 64% turnout, returned a result of 67% in favour of continuing membership. The United Kingdom remained a member of the EEC and its successor, the European Union, until 31 January 2020 when it withdrew from the Union following the 2016 United Kingdom European Union membership referendum. Letts noted there were no complaints in 1975 about the electorate not being well-enough informed to make a decision, unlike after the 2016 referendum. Letts also noted that Shore brought up the use of fear by the "yes" campaign to persuade the electorate, similar to complaints of a "Project Fear" of economic ruin used by chancellor George Osborne in his pro-EU 2016 referendum campaign.
