= Stephen Hastings =

British politician (1921-2005)

Sir Stephen Hastings MC

Member of Parliament for Mid Bedfordshire
- In office 16 November 1960 – 13 May 1983
- Preceded by: Alan Lennox-Boyd
- Succeeded by: Nicholas Lyell

Personal details
- Born: Stephen Lewis Edmonstone Hastings; 4 May 1921 Knightsbridge, London
- Died: 10 January 2005 (aged 83) Wansford, Cambridgeshire
- Party: Conservative
- Spouses: Harriet Tomlin (m. 1948; div. 1971) Elizabeth Naylor-Leyland (m. 1975; died 1997)
- Children: 2 (by Tomlin)
- Relatives: Max Hastings (cousin)
- Education: RMC Sandhurst
- Awards: Military Cross

Military service
- Allegiance: United Kingdom
- Branch/service: British Army
- Years of service: 1940–1948
- Rank: Major
- Unit: Scots Guards
- Battles/wars: Second World War
- Service No.: 112983

Sir Stephen Lewis Edmonstone Hastings MC (4 May 1921 – 10 January 2005) was a British Conservative politician who was elected Member of Parliament for Mid Bedfordshire in a 1960 by-election and held it until he stood down at the 1983 general election. He was also a soldier, MI6 operative, Master of Foxhounds and author.

The son of a Southern Rhodesian farmer and politician, Hastings spent a short time as a young child there but grew up with tales of the veldt and the farm. A year after he was elected to Parliament, he accepted an invitation from the British South Africa Company to visit the country, and from then on made frequent visits, getting to know the leading politicians of the white minority regime. Over the next twenty years, Hastings devoted his political energies to injecting what he felt was much needed balance into the debate about Rhodesia's future. When Rhodesia's Prime Minister, Ian Smith, unilaterally declared the independence of Rhodesia in 1965, Hastings was a prominent member of the Rhodesia lobby opposing sanctions – against the official party line. He strongly supported the 1978 Internal Settlement between Smith and the moderate nationalist leaders under which Bishop Abel Muzorewa became Prime Minister, though effective power remained in white hands. He saw the Lancaster House Agreement of 1979, which created an independent Republic of Zimbabwe and led to Robert Mugabe's election as Prime Minister of Zimbabwe in 1980, as a disaster caused by "unnecessary deference to the delusion of the Commonwealth, the Afro-Asian lobby and to the Americans by a series of British governments".

Although Hastings claimed to have been invited to join Edward Heath's ministry, his stance on Rhodesia effectively rendered him ineligible for office. Even Margaret Thatcher, whom he counted as an ally, kept him on the backbenches, though she recommended him for a knighthood in 1983. In his latter years at his Cambridgeshire home, Stibbington Hall, the only person whose photographs were displayed in more than one room (apart from those of his beloved late wife, Elizabeth) were those of Ian Smith.

== Early life ==
Hastings was born at Knightsbridge in Central London, son of Major Lewis Aloysius Macdonald Hastings (1880-1966) and Meriel Eda St John (1888-1971), daughter of Lieutenant-Colonel Neil Edmonstone, of the 4th Hussars. Lewis Hastings had run away to Southern Rhodesia at the age of 17 after leaving his school, going on to prospect for diamonds, serve in the Cape Mounted Police, and operate as a political organizer; after the First World War, he bought a farm there, founded the Southern Rhodesia Tobacco Growers' Association, and became an MP and war correspondent for the BBC.

For the first two years of his life, Stephen lived with his parents on the farm; then he and his younger sister were sent home to England, where they were brought up by their doting and affluent maternal grandmother in Berkshire. Hastings was proud of his Scottish ancestry, among whose relations were the MacDonalds of Sleat. He had an abiding affection for his cousin the historian and journalist, Max Hastings.

He learned to ride in Windsor Great Park, becoming an accomplished horseman. He attended Durnford School in Dorset (1929–34) and Eton College (1934–39). At Eton he managed to combine an undistinguished academic career, and with the clandestine help of his grandmother and her chauffeur, to engage in racing as an amateur jockey and, more importantly for his future, Hastings began a lifelong love for steeplechasing and fox hunting.

== Military career ==
On leaving school, his grandmother offered to pull strings to enable him to pursue a career either as a racehorse trainer or in the Scots Guards. He chose the latter. Commissioned in the Scots Guards from Royal Military College, Sandhurst in January 1940, with the service number of 112983, Hastings saw action against the Italians and Germans in the Western Desert, taking part in Operation Crusader, which relieved Tobruk and threw Rommel out of Cyrenaica.

After disagreements with his company commander he joined the SAS, and before El Alamein participated in a successful operation against an airfield, and a disastrous one against Benghazi, earning a Mention in Dispatches.

Then, after being diagnosed with chronic bronchitis, he landed a job in Cairo as ADC to the Minister of State, Richard Casey. By mid-1943 Hastings was pronounced fit again, and joined SOE. His first assignment was to accompany the Franco-American landing in the south of France. He arrived in the newly liberated Paris in August 1944, then was dropped with a wireless operator and interpreter behind enemy lines in the Apennines as chief liaison officer to the Italian partisans.

He found them demoralised and largely non-existent, but successfully trained and armed them, despite internal conflicts and frequent enemy attempts to capture him. By early April he had organised three divisions of about 4,000 partisans, which seized Piacenza and held a bridgehead over the River Po in a three-day operation. Hastings was constantly to the fore, coolly directing and encouraging his men while under constant machine-gun and mortar fire, according to the citation for his Military Cross.

After the capture of Piacenza, Hastings and a few companions journeyed through German-held territory, and strode into the piazza of a seaside village on the Adriatic. Hastings thereupon convinced the German officer in charge that it would be in his best interest to provide them with a fine seaside villa and supplies of champagne for the weeks that it would take the Allies to arrive.

At the end of April 1945, Hastings was in the Piazzale Loreto at Milan and saw the bodies of Benito Mussolini and Clara Petacci, who along with other executed fascists, were hanging upside down. He noted that Petacci's skirt had been pinned to her stockings to prevent her underwear from being revealed. Hastings considered this to be a perfect example of the often paradoxical delicacy of the Italian temperament.

The Piacenza operation was universally considered a major contribution to the Allied advance. He also found time to assemble a scratch pack - the Brindisi Vale Hounds - which hunted a reported, but probably non-existent, fox.

He was spared a posting to Nagasaki by a friend finding him a job in the economic division of the control commission in Austria, a post for which, he admitted at his interview, he had no relevant qualifications. When the friend returned to England, Hastings remained in Austria, taking a staff job with the Army with the sole duty of looking after the polo ponies, and occasionally played himself.

He was then sent to a former Wehrmacht training centre, above the Judenburg in Styria, where he captained the British troops' ski-racing team but broke a leg during a competition against the French.

== 1948 onwards ==
Finding peacetime duties unexciting, Hastings left the Army in 1948. He turned down an offer from Gillette and was refused a job by the BBC. Eventually he was invited by a friend to join MI6, which sent him in 1950 to Finland, disguised as an assistant military attaché. Four years later he moved to Paris, where he observed the conspiracy over the Suez operation and the machinations that preceded Charles de Gaulle's return to power. From 1958 to 1960, he worked in the political office of the Middle East forces in Cyprus. As a result of his work countering the KGB, Hastings was one of the few Englishmen of his class and age to enjoy vodka neat, as well as the company of all and sundry. He, like his wife Elizabeth, was utterly unsnobbish.

The unproven imputations put forward in the book Spycatcher, in which Hastings was portrayed as participating in an attempt to destabilise the Harold Wilson government were always vehemently denied by him. The book's author, Peter Wright, was regularly denounced by Hastings as "that traitor", though no one knew exactly to what betrayal he was referring.

His disgust at the Suez Crisis led to his putting his name down with Conservative Central Office as a candidate, and in 1960 he was offered the safe seat of Mid Bedfordshire; He won a 1960 by-election caused by the elevation to the peerage of Alan Lennox-Boyd. He retained his seat in the subsequent general elections in 1964, 1966, 1970, February 1974, October 1974, and 1979, but stood down at the 1983 general election, when he was succeeded by fellow-Conservative Sir Nicholas Lyell. Hastings quickly established his credentials on the Right of the party, becoming a stalwart of the Monday Club and an ally of the likes of Julian Amery and Ronald Bell. He served on various backbench committees, becoming a member of the executive of the 1922 Committee and vice-chairman of the Conservative backbench Foreign Affairs Committee. At the 1964 Conservative Party Conference, he was cheered to the rafters by conference delegates for a speech deeply critical of the party leadership; he was never invited to speak again.

He could be an effective Commons performer. His self-confident, upper-class drawl and theatrical oratorical style enraged Labour MPs. He was often embroiled in controversy concerning Communist infiltration. In 1977 he alleged that five prominent trades union officials were agents for communist countries, based on tape recordings made by the Czech defector Josef Frolík. The following year, before Margaret Thatcher came into office, Hastings and Brian Crozier wrote her a paper setting out "the diabolical nature of the Communist conspiracy" against Britain. At Hastings's suggestion she appointed a committee comprising Willie Whitelaw, Lord Carrington, Sir Keith Joseph and Hastings himself. This proposed forming a counter-subversion executive but the scheme was quietly dropped after the Tories came to power in 1979.

In 1986 Hastings successfully sued The Observer newspaper for libel following allegations that he had been one of two Conservative MPs involved in an MI5 plot to oust Harold Wilson.

Hastings remained a friend of Thatcher after his retirement from the Commons in 1983. He and his wife entertained the Thatchers and other notables at Milton Hall, the largest private house in Cambridgeshire. In 1982 Margaret and Denis Thatcher were at dinner with the Hastings at Milton when the butler entered to ask the Prime Minister to the telephone, by which Mrs Thatcher was informed of Argentina's invasion of the British South Atlantic island of South Georgia. This marked the start of the Falklands War.

Outside his parliamentary duties, Hastings continued to ride, hunting regularly with the Fitzwilliam and other hunts. In 1982 he was elected chairman of the British Field Sports Society in succession to Sir Marcus Kimball. After retiring from Parliament, he became a partner and manager of the Milton Park Stud, a member of the council of the Thoroughbred Breeders' Association, and joint master of the Fitzwilliam Hunt. He had maintained his lifelong love of racing and each evening before dinner, a glass of champagne in hand, he would watch the races of the day, prerecorded by his butler.

Hastings was chairman of the Peterborough Cathedral Development and Preservation Trust and helped raise millions of pounds for the cathedral's restoration. He was patron of 32 livings, and took his duty to help provide priests for his parishes seriously. He and Elizabeth could be found in the squire's pew at the Church of St Mary the Virgin, Marholm, any Sunday they were at Milton.

Hastings was an accomplished painter, a fine sculptor, and wrote two books, The Murder of TSR2 (1966) and a well-received autobiography, The Drums of Memory (1995). He regularly skied in Switzerland until he was in his ninth decade, and hunted with the Fitzwilliam over forty times in the year before his death.

Stephen Hastings married first, in 1948 (dissolved 1971), Harriet Tomlin, with whom he had a son Neil and a daughter Carola. He married secondly, in 1975, Elizabeth Anne Marie Gabrielle, the former Lady Naylor-Leyland. Lady Hastings was born the younger daughter of the 2nd and last Viscount FitzAlan of Derwent and Joyce Langdale of Houghton Hall, West Riding, Yorkshire, who secondly married Thomas Wentworth-Fitzwilliam, 10th and last Earl Fitzwilliam.

In 1979 Lord Fizwilliam left the bulk of his great art collection and the estates of Milton, Cambridgeshire, Wentworth Woodhouse, near Doncaster, and Malton, North Yorkshire, as well as a grand town house in Belgrave Square to his widow, and to Elizabeth, who was widely known in society as the daughter of Lord Fitzwilliam, a fact which she was known to confirm from time to time, though with reservations. Lady Hastings died from cancer at Milton in 1997. She was succeeded in her stewardship of the Fitzwilliam heritage by her son, Philip Naylor-Leyland, 4th Baronet.

Sir Stephen Hastings died on 10 January 2005 at Stibbington House, Cambridgeshire, from oesophageal cancer.

Parliament of the United Kingdom
Preceded by Alan Lennox-Boyd	Member of Parliament for Mid Bedfordshire; 1960–1983	Succeeded by Sir Nicholas Lyell
