= Maurice Lyell =

British barrister and judge

Sir Maurice Legat Lyell (28 July 1901 – 27 May 1975) was a British barrister and judge, who sat in the Queen's Bench Division of the High Court of Justice from 1962 to 1971.

== Life ==
Lyell was born on 28 July 1901 and educated at Trinity College, Glenalmond in Glenalmond, Scotland. He was educated at Keble College, Oxford, where he was a classics scholar, and he obtained a second-class degree in Modern History in 1923. He was called to the bar (becoming a barrister) as a member of Inner Temple in 1926, and practised in London and on the North-Eastern Circuit. He was Director of Press Censorship at the Ministry of Information between 1940 and 1945. In 1954, he was appointed Queen's Counsel. He became a High Court Judge in 1962, receiving the customary knighthood, and was assigned to the Queen's Bench Division. He was also made an Honorary Fellow of Keble College in 1962. He retired from the bench in 1971, and died on 27 May 1975.

He was the father of Nicholas Lyell, Baron Lyell of Markyate, Attorney-General from 1992 to 1997.
