= Alistair Burt =

British politician (born 1955)

The Right Honourable Alistair Burt
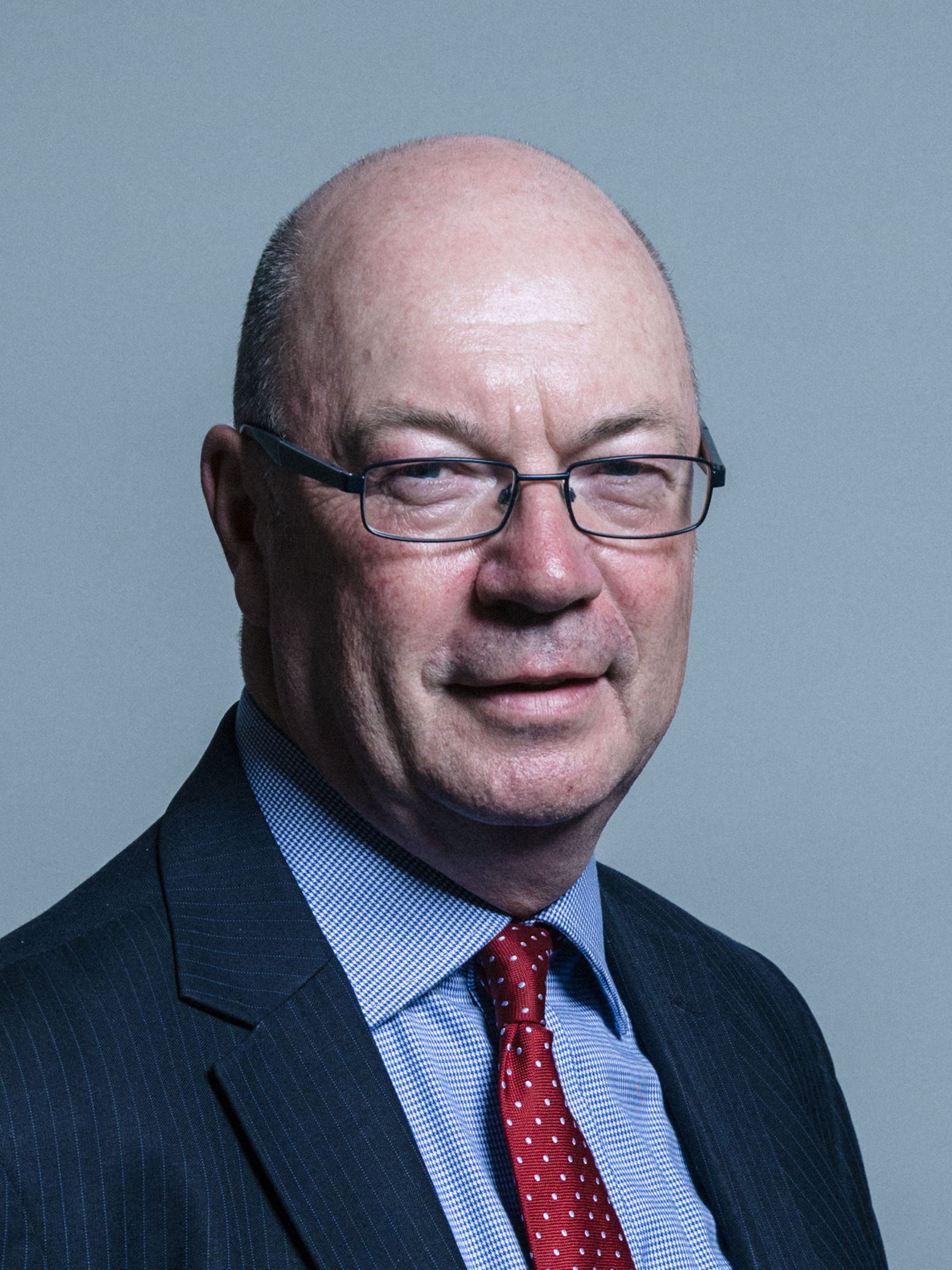
- Official portrait, 2017

Minister of State for Middle East and North Africa (Note: Parliamentary Under-Secretary of State (2010–13))
- In office 13 June 2017 – 25 March 2019
- Prime Minister: Theresa May
- Preceded by: Tobias Ellwood
- Succeeded by: Andrew Murrison
- In office 13 May 2010 – 7 October 2013
- Prime Minister: David Cameron
- Preceded by: Office established
- Succeeded by: Hugh Robertson

Minister of State for International Development
- In office 13 June 2017 – 25 March 2019
- Prime Minister: Theresa May
- Preceded by: James Wharton
- Succeeded by: Andrew Murrison

Minister of State for Community and Social Care
- In office 11 May 2015 – 15 July 2016
- Prime Minister: David Cameron
- Preceded by: Norman Lamb
- Succeeded by: David Mowat

Minister of State for Disabled People
- In office 5 July 1995 – 4 May 1997
- Prime Minister: John Major
- Preceded by: William Hague
- Succeeded by: Paul Boateng

Member of Parliament for North East Bedfordshire
- In office 7 June 2001 – 6 November 2019
- Preceded by: Nicholas Lyell
- Succeeded by: Richard Fuller

Member of Parliament for Bury North
- In office 9 June 1983 – 8 April 1997
- Preceded by: New constituency
- Succeeded by: David Chaytor

Pro-Chancellor of Lancaster University
- Incumbent
- Assumed office 1 October 2020
- Chancellor: Alan Milburn
- Preceded by: The Lord Liddle

Personal details
- Born: Alistair James Hendrie Burt; 25 May 1955 (age 71) Bury, Lancashire, England
- Party: Conservative (until 2019, 2019–2024)
- Other political affiliations: Independent (2019)
- Spouse: Eve Alexandra Twite
- Education: St John's College, Oxford

Alistair James Hendrie Burt (born 25 May 1955) is a Conservative British politician who has served as UK Envoy for Complex Consular Detentions since July 2026, and who served as Member of Parliament (MP) for North East Bedfordshire from 2001 until 2019. He was previously MP for his native Bury North in Greater Manchester from 1983 until 1997. Burt was Parliamentary Under Secretary of State then Minister of State at the Department of Social Security from 1992 to 1997, and Parliamentary Under Secretary of State at the Foreign and Commonwealth Office from 2010 to 2013. Burt was also Minister of State at the Department of Health from May 2015 to July 2016.

First elected as a Conservative, Burt had the Conservative whip removed on 3 September 2019. On 29 October he was one of ten Conservative MPs to have the whip restored. He retired at the 2019 general election.

== Early life and education ==
Alistair Burt was born in Bury, Lancashire, and was educated at the Bury Grammar School, where he was appointed Head Boy in 1973. He read Jurisprudence at St John's College, Oxford, graduating in 1977. Whilst a student at Oxford, Burt attended the televised 1975 A Question of Europe debate wearing the stereotyped French dress of a beret, striped shirt, and string of onions. He was elected president of the Oxford Law Society in 1976. He became an articled clerk with Slater Heelis & Co. of Manchester in 1978, becoming a solicitor with Watts Vallence & Vallence in 1980 where he remained until 1983.

== Early parliamentary career ==
Burt was elected as a councillor on Haringey Borough Council in 1982 and left the council in 1984. He contested the new seat of Bury North at the 1983 general election at which he was elected as the Conservative MP with a majority of 2,792 votes. He represented the seat until 1997 and returned to parliament again in 2001.

In Parliament Alistair Burt became the Parliamentary Private Secretary (PPS) to the Secretary of State for the Environment Kenneth Baker in 1985, he remained as PPS to Baker in his role as Secretary of State for Education and Science from 1986 and in his role as the Chancellor of the Duchy of Lancaster from 1989 until 1990. Following the 1992 general election Burt was promoted to the government of John Major and became the Parliamentary Under Secretary of State at the Department of Social Security where he remained until 1995, when he was promoted further with the rank of Minister of State at the same department. He was one of many ministers who lost their seats at the 1997 general election when Bury North fell to Labour's David Chaytor by 7,866 votes. From 1997 to 2001, he worked at executive search firm Whitehead Mann GKR.

== Opposition years ==
Alistair Burt re-entered parliament at the 2001 general election for the very safe Conservative seat of Bedfordshire North East, previously represented in parliament by the former Attorney General Nicholas Lyell who had retired. Burt was elected with a majority of 8,577; he was made an opposition spokesman on Education and Skills under William Hague in 2001, before becoming PPS to the Leader of the Opposition Iain Duncan Smith in 2002. The following year, Burt carried on as PPS to the new leader Michael Howard.

Following the 2005 general election, he rejoined the front bench and was a spokesman on Local Government Affairs and Communities. However, in January 2008, Burt was promoted to Assistant Chief Whip and Deputy Chairman of the Conservative Party with responsibility for Internal Development.

Burt is a former officer of the Conservative Friends of Israel, a position which he resigned upon entering government as a Minister in the Foreign and Commonwealth Office. In December 2008, he led an all-Party group meeting with the Red Cross to campaign for visiting rights for the Israeli hostage Gilad Shalit. 2013–14 He was a member of the Political Council of the Henry Jackson Society. He is also joint founder and first Chairman of The Enterprise Forum, an organisation set up in 1997 to facilitate discussions on policy between the Business Community and the Conservative Party. He is a vice-president of the Tory Reform Group.

== Cameron–Clegg ministry ==
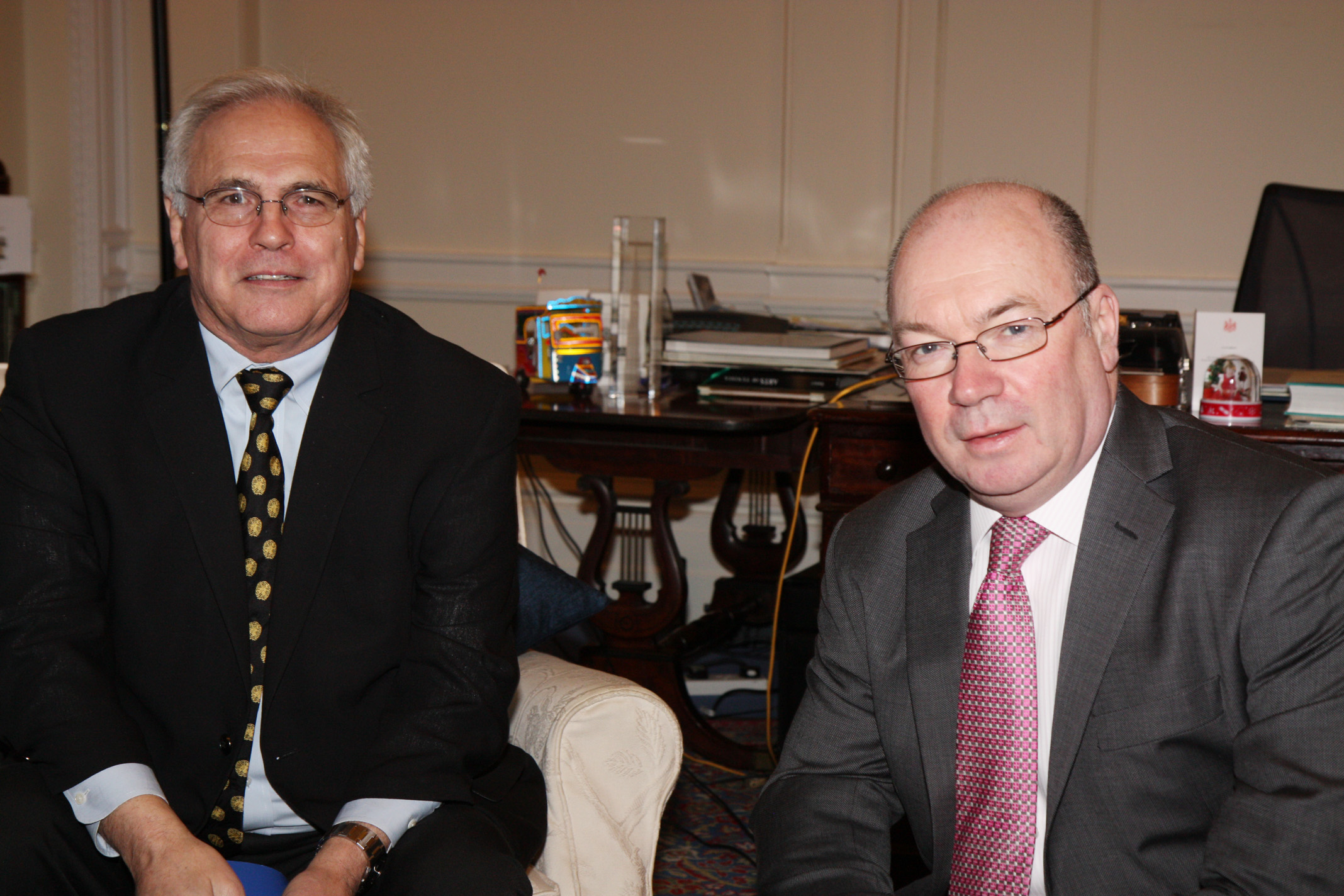
Burt (right) with Christopher W. S. Ross in 2009

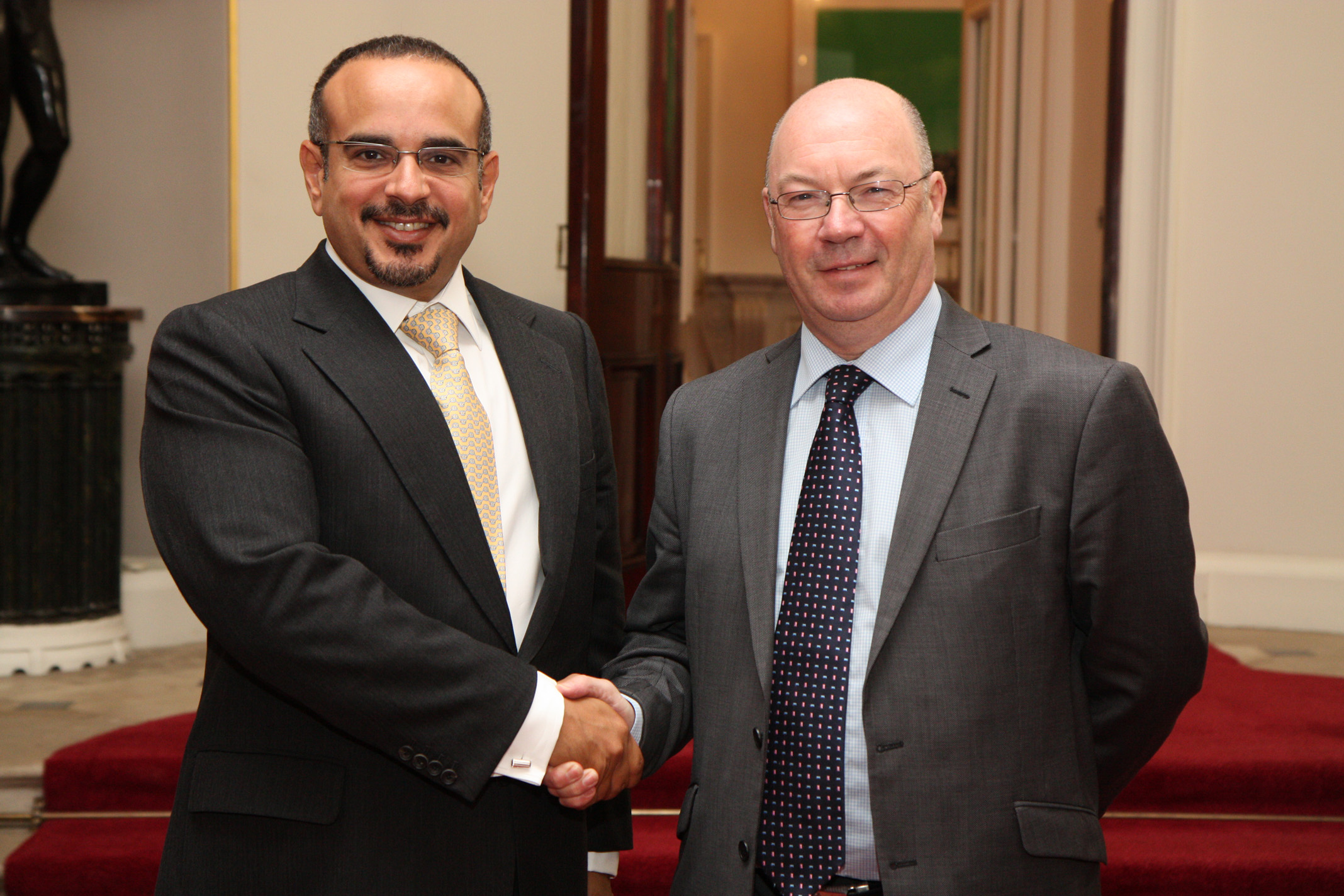
Burt with Salman, Crown Prince of Bahrain, in October 2012

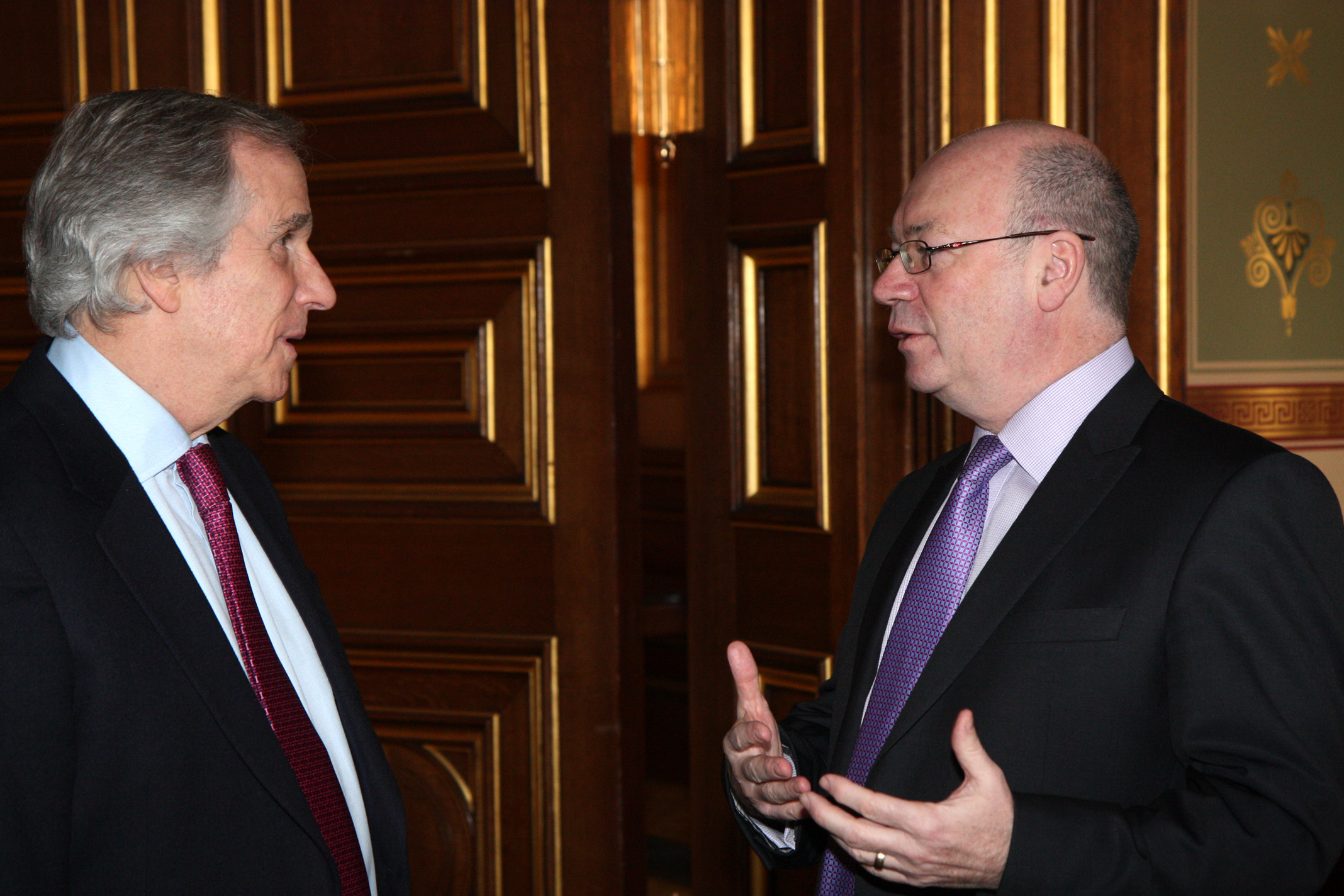
Burt with American actor Henry Winkler who spoke at the Foreign Office in London on his experience of living with Dyslexia, 5 March 2013

Burt was appointed Parliamentary Under Secretary of State at the Foreign and Commonwealth Office (FCO) on 14 May 2010. His roles there included overseeing British-Syria policy for three years that included the start of the Syrian civil war, and leading on Israeli issues for the government at the United Nations. Burt was angered at the failure of MPs in August 2013 to support the British government's plan to participate in military strikes against the Syrian government, in the wake of a chemical-weapons attack at Ghouta. He stepped down on 7 October 2013. Burt had been delegated under William Hague specific responsibilities for advancing FCO policy on:

- Afghanistan and South Asia
- Middle East and North Africa
- North America
- Counter terrorism
- Counter proliferation
- FCO finance
- Human resources and diversity

After standing down from the FCO, Burt was made a Privy Councillor on 16 October 2013, and in December that year, was appointed a Commissioner of the International Commission on Missing Persons.

=== Critic of Syria policy ===
As a former minister, he was freed to argue that the parliamentary vote against taking military action in Syria was a bad precedent, and it would be better if the government made decisions such as this in future by "executive action". In June 2014 Burt called the lack of intervention in Syria "a disaster".

== Cameron ministry ==
Following the Conservative victory in the 2015 general election on 11 May, Burt returned to Government as Minister of State for Community and Social Care in the Department of Health.

As a Conservative health minister, he blocked a new law to provide cheap and effective drugs for the NHS by championing medicines whose patents have expired. Burt spoke in Parliament for nearly half an hour to filibuster the proposed Off-Patent Drugs Bill, a plan that had cross-party support from backbenchers. He said “It is not always the case that something brought forward by a charity and advocated passionately by colleagues is always the answer. It's not disgraceful – it's the right answer.” The Bill was subsequently revised and placed into law with agreement from all sides on the issue

As the Minister of State for Community and Social Care, he announced on 17 July 2015 that the implementation of the cap on care costs would be delayed until April 2020. The introduction of the cap had been passed into law as part of the Care Act 2014 during the coalition government, and implementation of that part of the law from 2016 onwards had been accepted by all main political parties during the general election of 2015.

== Later parliamentary career ==
In July 2016, Burt announced that he would be resigning from his Ministerial position, "Twenty-four years and one month ago, I answered my first question as a junior minister in oral questions and I’ve just completed my last oral questions," Burt said. It was made clear that his resignation was not related to Brexit.

Historically Burt had been active in seeking justice for the victims of the Tainted Blood Scandal. In November 2016, following his departure from a ministerial post he made a passionate speech to Parliament in order to layout events stating: "In June 2015, I was re-invited by the then Prime Minister to join the Government in the Department of Health, at which point I went quiet on campaigning as far as the public were concerned. I know that some people misinterpreted that. My position in the Department of Health was not conditional on the fact that I had been involved with contaminated blood, and neither was my position in the Foreign Office or my decision to leave the Department of Health of my own accord earlier this year. However, the ministerial convention is clear: Ministers say only what the Government's position is. We cannot have two colleagues firing away on the same issues, so I did indeed go quiet publicly for a period".

=== Foreign and Commonwealth Office ===
In Theresa May's reshuffle following the 2017 election, Burt accepted his old post back at the Foreign Office. The role is a shared one, with Burt also being Minister in the Department for International Development. Burt resigned from government by voting for Oliver Letwin's amendment on 25 March 2019.

==== Support of Yemen policy ====
Burt defended the British involvement in the Saudi Arabian–led intervention in Yemen against the Shia Houthis. He said that the United Kingdom "remains committed to supporting Saudi Arabia to address its legitimate security needs."

==== Stance on Israel ====
While serving as the Middle East minister in Theresa May’s Conservative administration, Burt says he and her government were wrong not to “call out” Israel over the death of paramedic Razan al-Najjar, 21, in Palestinian protests on Gaza’s border with Israel in 2018

=== Sitting as an independent ===
On 3 September 2019, Burt joined 20 other rebel Conservative MPs to vote against the Conservative government of Boris Johnson. The rebel MPs voted with the Opposition against a Conservative motion which subsequently failed. Effectively, they helped block Johnson's no-deal Brexit plan from proceeding on 31 October. Subsequently, all 21 were advised that they had lost the Conservative whip, expelling them as Conservative MPs and requiring them to sit as independents. If they had decided to stand for re-election in a future election, the party would have blocked their selection as Conservative candidates. Burt himself, however, decided that he would not seek re-election at the next general election. He was readmitted to the Conservative Party alongside nine other MPs on 29 October, before the general election took place, which he chose not to contest.

== Post-parliamentary career ==
In September 2020 he was appointed as Pro-Chancellor of Lancaster University, succeeding Lord Liddle.

Burt was named the UK Envoy for Complex Consular Detentions in July 2026.

== Funding and expenses ==
In 2009, Burt was found to have over-claimed for rent by £1,000, but was not required to return the money as he was not claiming expenses for food.

== Personal life ==
Burt married Eve Alexandra Twite in 1983 in Haringey. Burt is an active Christian. He enjoys athletics and football, and supports Bury F.C. He is a member of Biggleswade Athletics Club, and has run many London Marathons and Harrold Pit Runs.

== Notes ==
Parliament of the United Kingdom
New constituency	Member of Parliament for Bury North; 1983–1997	Succeeded by David Chaytor
Preceded by Nicholas Lyell	Member of Parliament for North East Bedfordshire; 2001–2019	Succeeded by Richard Fuller
Political offices
Preceded by William Hague	Minister of State for Disabled; 1995–1997	Succeeded by Paul Boateng
Preceded by Ivan Lewis	Under-Secretary of State for Foreign and Commonwealth Affairs; 2010–2013	Succeeded by Hugh Robertson
Preceded by Norman Lamb	Minister of State for Community and Social Care; 2015–2016	Succeeded by Philip Dunne
Preceded by Tobias Ellwood	Minister of State for International Development; 2016–2019	Succeeded by Andrew Murrison
Preceded by James Wharton	Minister of State for Foreign and Commonwealth Affairs; 2016–2019	Succeeded by Andrew Murrison
