= Blake Stephenson =

British politician

Blake Stephenson MP
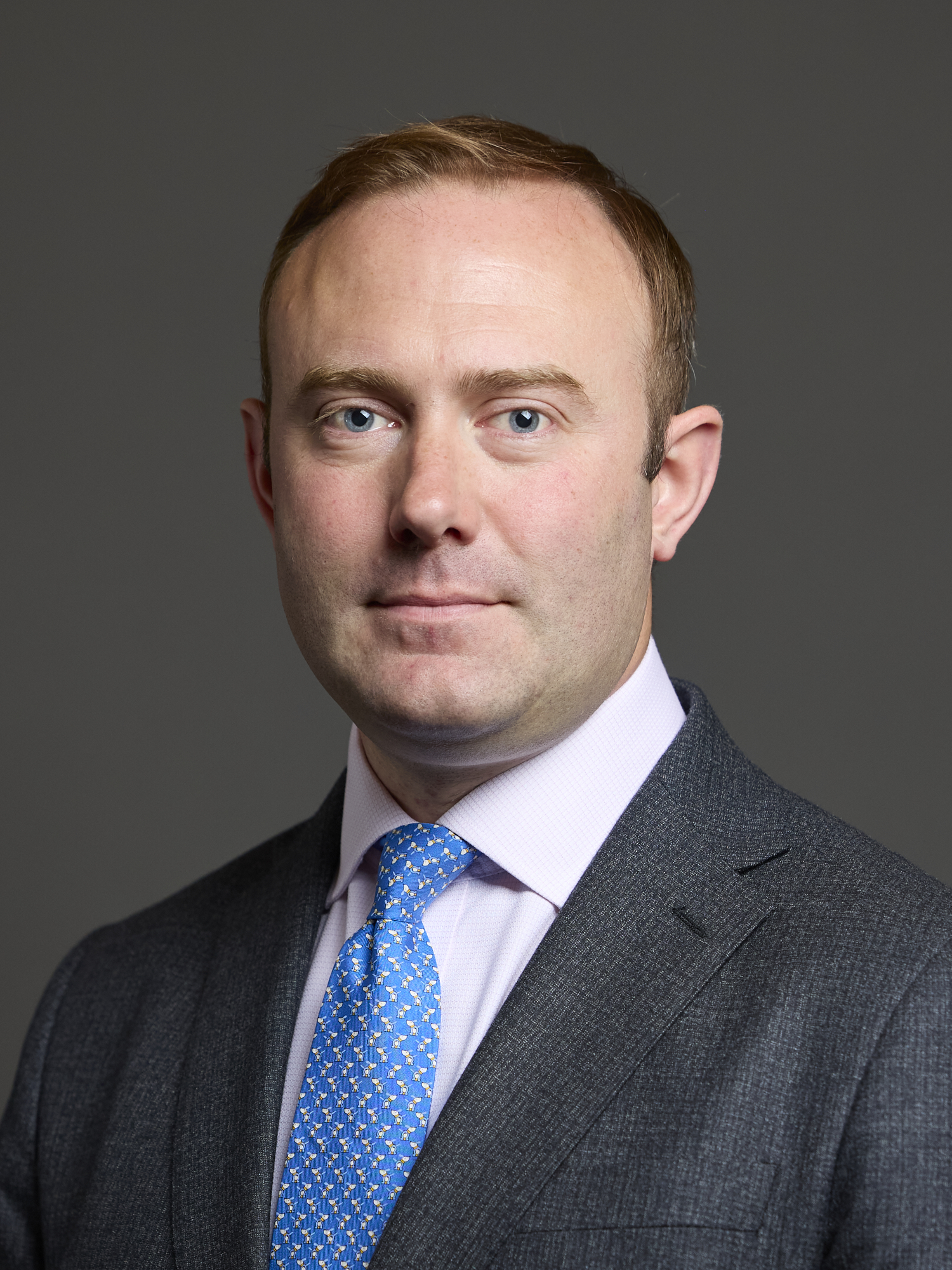
- Official portrait, 2024

Shadow Parliamentary Under-Secretary of State for the Home Office
- Incumbent
- Assumed office 31 August 2026
- Leader: Kemi Badenoch

Member of Parliament for Mid Bedfordshire
- Incumbent
- Assumed office 4 July 2024
- Preceded by: Alistair Strathern
- Majority: 1,321 (2.7%)

Personal details
- Party: Conservative
- Education: University of Kent (BA), University of Law (GDL), City St. George's, University of London (BVC)
- Occupation: Politician, barrister
- Website: Official Website

Blake Stephenson is a British Conservative Party politician who has been Member of Parliament for Mid Bedfordshire since 2024. He is Shadow Parliamentary Under Secretary at the Home Office.

== Early life and education ==
Stephenson studied Industrial Relations and Human Resource Management at the University of Kent. Following this, Stephenson then studied Law at the College of Law (now the University of Law) in Guildford.

Stephenson also studied a Bar Vocational Course at the Inns of Court School of Law (now City St George's, University of London).

== Professional career ==
Stephenson is a barrister by profession, and was called to the Bar in 2007 by the Honourable Society of Lincoln's Inn. Stephenson's career specialised in ethics and compliance roles within wholesale financial markets. Stephenson worked at the Financial Services Authority, Nasdaq, the London Stock Exchange and fintech company Tradeweb Markets before becoming an MP.

== Political career ==
Stephenson is also a Central Bedfordshire local councillor representing the villages of Gravenhurst and Shillington.

In November 2024, Stephenson was appointed Parliamentary Private Secretary to the Shadow Chancellor Mel Stride.

Stephenson is also a member of the Environmental Audit Committee and the Public Accounts Committee, both select committees in the House of Commons.

On 31 August 2026, he was appointed Shadow Parliamentary Under Secretary at the Home Office.

At the 2026 Conservative Party Conference, Stephenson said parts of Luton near his constituency were "a very dangerous place" with "parts where white people won't go ... like no-go zones". This was criticised in Luton as incorrect, and the area's Police and Crime Commissioner, John Tizard, wrote to Stephenson saying this was "not supported by evidence and bear a troubling resemblance to far-right agitators seeking to divide communities."

== Electoral history ==
General election 2024: Mid Bedfordshire
Party	Candidate	Votes	%	±%
Conservative	Blake Stephenson	16,912	34.1	−26.4
Labour	Maahwish Mirza	15,591	31.4	+10.9
Reform	David Holland	8,594	17.3	N/A
Liberal Democrats	Stuart Roberts	4,068	8.2	−4.3
Green	Cade Sibley	2,584	5.2	+1.3
Independent	Gareth Mackey	1,700	3.4	+3.4
SDP	Richard Brunning	172	0.3	+0.3
Majority		1,321	2.7	−36.7
Turnout		49,621	65.1	−6.4
Registered electors		76,218		
Conservative hold		Swing	−18.6	

Parliament of the United Kingdom
Preceded by Alistair Strathern	Member of Parliament for Mid Bedfordshire; 2024–present	Incumbent
