= 1960 Mid Bedfordshire by-election =

UK Parliamentary by-election

The 1960 Mid Bedfordshire by-election was held on 16 November 1960 after the incumbent Conservative MP, Alan Lennox-Boyd became an hereditary peer. It was won by the Conservative candidate Stephen Hastings.

Lennox-Boyd had held the seat in 1959 with a majority of 5,174 votes of the Labour Party's Bryan Magee. At the by-election Magee was again the Labour candidate, while the Liberals also fielded their 1959 candidate, W. G. Matthews.

Mid Bedfordshire by-election, 1960
Party	Candidate	Votes	%	±%
Conservative	Stephen Hastings	17,503	45.38	−1.41
Labour	Bryan Magee	11,281	29.25	−6.17
Liberal	Wilfred G. Matthews	9,550	24.76	+6.97
New Conservative	C. F. H. Gilliard	235	0.61	New
Majority		6,222	16.13	+4.77
Turnout		38,569	71.10	
Conservative hold		Swing		

== See also ==
- 2023 Mid Bedfordshire by-election
