= 2023 Mid Bedfordshire by-election =

UK parliamentary by-election

- 19 October 2023

Mid Bedfordshire constituency
- Turnout: 44.1%
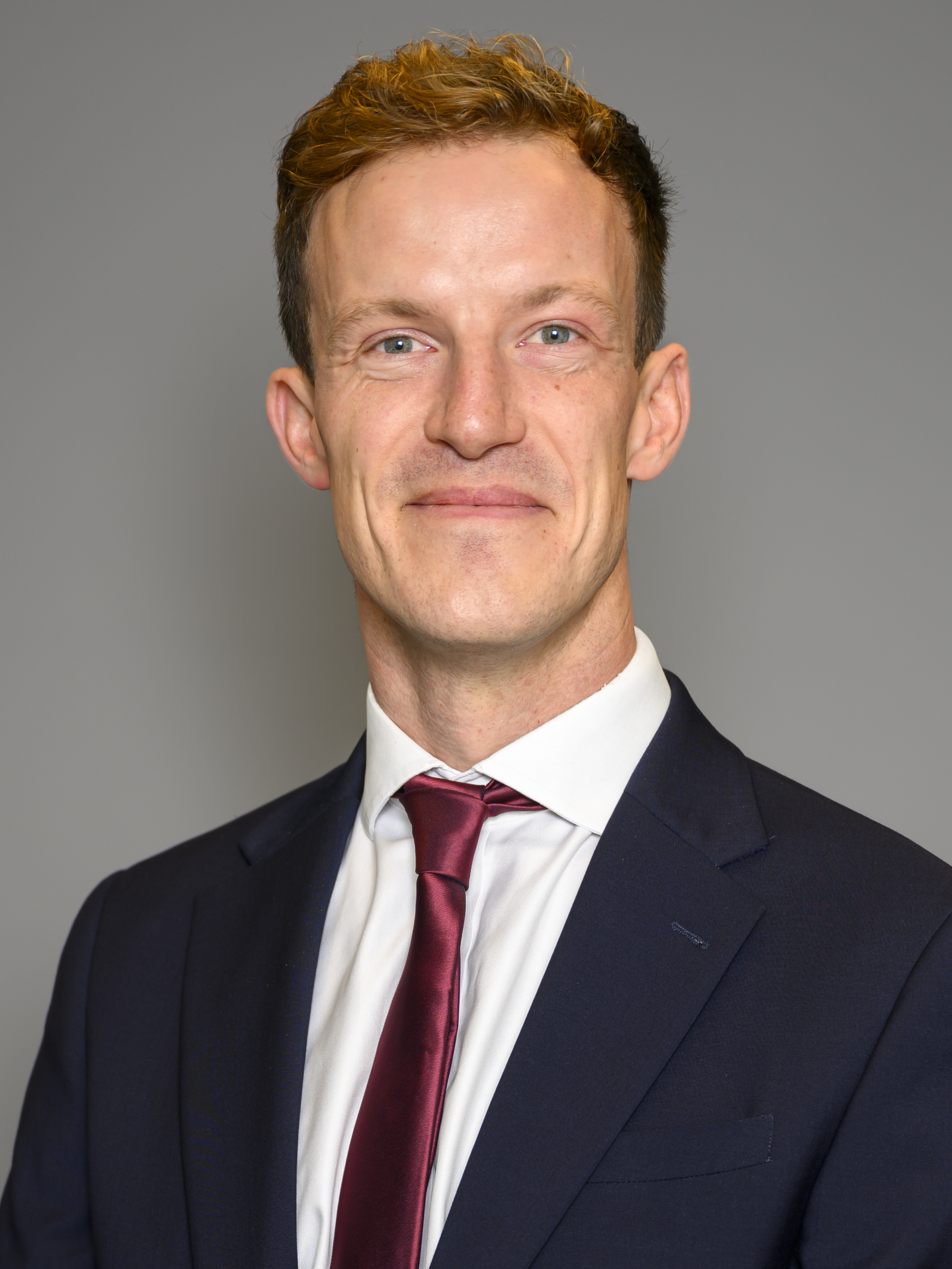

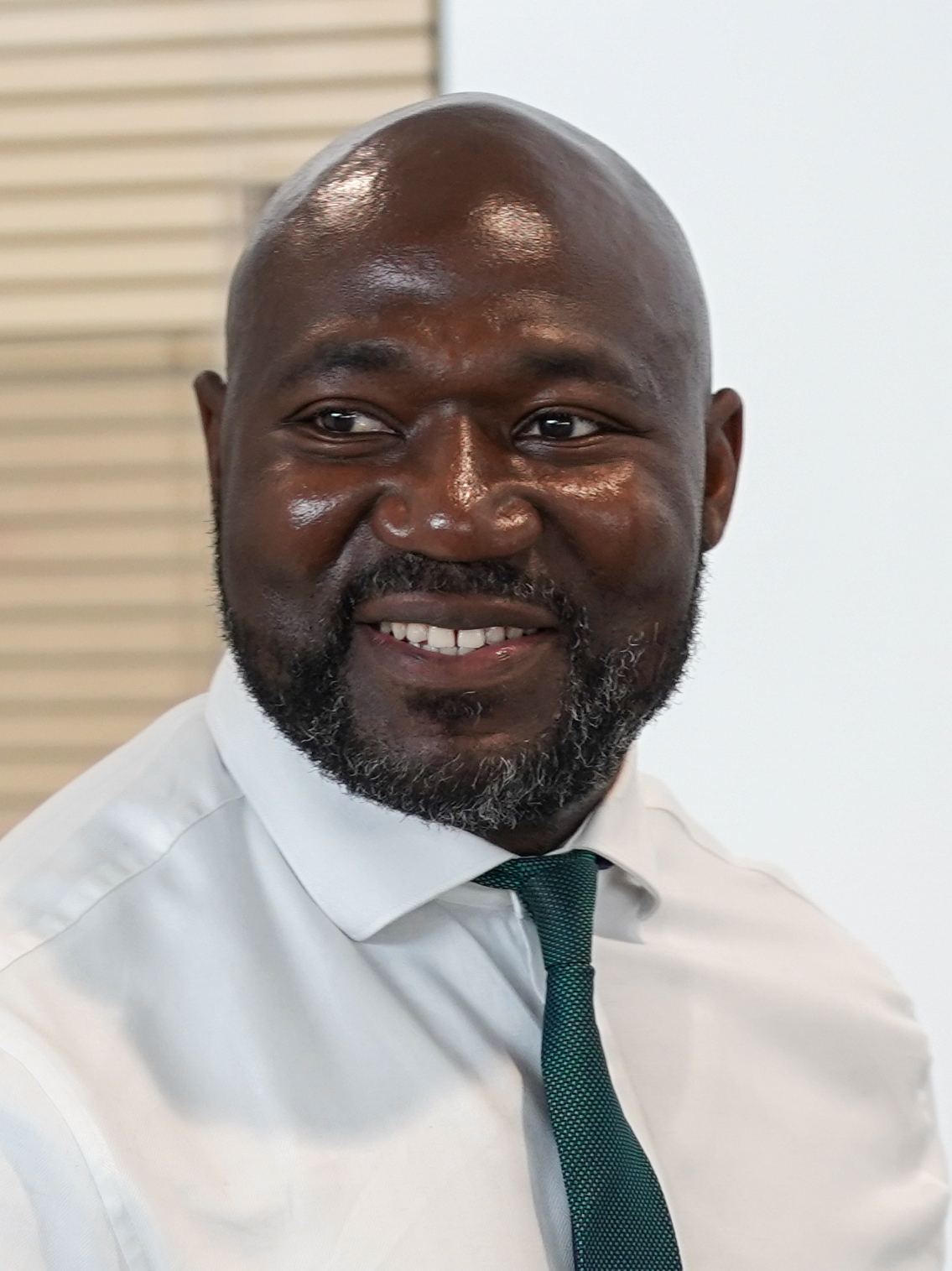
	First party	Second party	Third party
			LD
Candidate	Alistair Strathern	Festus Akinbusoye	Emma Holland-Lindsay
Party	Labour	Conservative	Liberal Democrats
Popular vote	13,872	12,680	9,420
Percentage	34.1%	31.1%	23.1%
Swing	▲12.4 pp	▼28.7 pp	▲10.5 pp
MP before election
Nadine Dorries
Conservative
Elected MP
Alistair Strathern
Labour

A by-election for the United Kingdom parliamentary constituency of Mid Bedfordshire was held on 19 October 2023, triggered by the resignation of incumbent Conservative MP Nadine Dorries. Alistair Strathern of the Labour Party won the by-election, marking the first Labour victory in the seat since its creation in 1918.

On 9 June 2023, Dorries announced that she was standing down from the seat "with immediate effect". She then delayed her formal process of resignation until 29 August.

The by-election was held on the same day as the 2023 Tamworth by-election, which also resulted in a Labour gain from the Conservatives.

== Background ==
=== Constituency ===
Mid Bedfordshire is a large rural constituency in Bedfordshire. Towns in the seat include Ampthill, Flitwick and Shefford. Smaller villages in the seat include Meppershall and Woburn. Residents are wealthier than the UK average and health is around the UK average. The previous by-election in the constituency had been in 1960.

The constituency had been held by the Conservatives since 1931, with Nadine Dorries as its MP since 2005. At the 2019 general election, Dorries won with a majority of 24,664.

=== Initial announcement ===
Dorries has been a strong supporter of former Prime Minister Boris Johnson. She had previously announced her decision to stand down at the 2024 general election, having criticised her colleagues for getting rid of Johnson. There had been speculation for months that she, Nigel Adams and Alok Sharma were to receive peerages in Johnson's resignation honours list.

The Sunday Times reported that, on 2 June 2023, Johnson met the current Conservative Prime Minister, Rishi Sunak, and agreed to campaign for him if Sunak approved his honours list. A source close to Sunak said that no deal had been agreed, but that Sunak had said he would not interfere in the process. The list of proposed peerages went to the House of Lords Appointments Commission (HOLAC), who rejected several names, including Dorries, Adams and Sharma, as they were serving MPs who were not planning to stand down imminently. This led to a row about whether arrangements could be made for Dorries and the others. Johnson wanted Sunak to overrule HOLAC or to promise to give Adams, Dorries and Sharma peerages later, but Sunak refused. Sunak said on 12 June that Johnson asked him to overrule HOLAC or make promises to people of peerages at a later stage, but that he "was not prepared to do that". Tim Shipman in The Sunday Times reported that Johnson messaged Dorries after this meeting, telling her she was on the list.

On the morning of 9 June, Dorries denied she would be resigning. When she subsequently announced that she would be resigning "with immediate effect" later in the day, she said "something significant" had happened to change her mind, without giving further detail. However, this came shortly after reports that she had been dropped from the list so as to avoid a by-election. Later on 9 June, Johnson's honours list was published without Dorries.

According to The Times, Johnson and his nominees believed mistakenly that they could be re-vetted by HOLAC every six months without needing to be re-nominated, as long as they said they would be standing down at the next general election. Dorries first discovered on the evening of 8 June that she was not on the honours list. On 9 June, she contacted a senior minister and said that Johnson had assured her that she could be re-vetted and nominated at a later date. The minister said that she would have needed to have resigned as an MP already or notified HOLAC of her intention to do so. Dorries asked if she could resign immediately and be put back on the list; her request was refused. She asked if Sunak would submit her for a peerage at the next election, and was told Sunak would not be making any promises. Dorries subsequently announced her resignation.

Later the same day, Johnson also announced his intention to resign as an MP over the way the Commons Privileges Committee had investigated his statements to Parliament related to Partygate, eventually triggering another by-election in Uxbridge and South Ruislip.

Dorries later criticised Sunak and his adviser James Forsyth as "posh boys", who "duplicitously and cruelly" blocked her from receiving a peerage. Johnson also continued to criticise Sunak.

=== Delay in resignation ===
Having announced her intention to resign, Dorries delayed formally resigning as an MP, to the frustration of the Conservative Party. The Financial Times reported that she was doing so to cause trouble for Sunak.

On the evening of 14 June, Dorries tweeted to say that it was "absolutely" her intention to resign, but that she was delaying doing so until she had received information requested about why she was not awarded a peerage. She missed the deadline to resign in order for a by-election to occur before Parliament's summer recess.

In summer 2023, both Flitwick and Shefford Town Councils wrote open letters to Dorries, urging her to immediately vacate the seat, citing her lack of representation for her constituents and criticising her absence. Labour MP Chris Bryant proposed the use of a 19th century Parliamentary rule to table a motion requiring Dorries to attend Parliament or be suspended, which would lead to a recall petition.

On 26 August 2023, Dorries formally announced her resignation; her resignation letter to the Prime Minister was also published in the Daily Mail. The letter was highly critical of Sunak, accusing him of abandoning "the fundamental principles of Conservatism", and also claiming the police had visited her home due to threats made to her person. The formal process of resignation, by appointment to the position of Steward and Bailiff of the Three Hundreds of Chiltern, was completed on 29 August 2023.

Parliament was in recess when Dorries formally resigned; the motion for the writ of election was made when it reconvened on 4 September 2023, with the warrant for the writ issued on 12 September.

== Candidates ==
On 15 June, Bedfordshire Police and Crime Commissioner Festus Akinbusoye was selected as the Conservative candidate. Akinbusoye's election would have resulted in him vacating his commissioner role, resulting in a Bedfordshire-wide by-election for the post.

The Labour Party chose Alistair Strathern as their candidate. He was a councillor on Waltham Forest London Borough Council from May 2014 until he resigned on 5 September 2023. (A by-election was held for his ward on 26 October 2023.) He had been a cabinet member (portfolio-holder) on Waltham Forest London Borough Council since 2021, receiving an annual allowance of £37,777, in addition to his salary as "climate lead" at the Bank of England. His previous jobs were as a director of Ascham Homes Limited from June 2014 to November 2015, and as a maths teacher. Strathern has been associated with Greenpeace. Strathern grew up in Bedfordshire, and in July 2023, he announced that he had moved from London to Shefford, Bedfordshire.

The Liberal Democrats selected Emma Holland-Lindsay as their candidate on 19 June. She is a local councillor as a member of Central Bedfordshire Council, in Leighton Buzzard, part of the South West Bedfordshire constituency.

On 12 June, Reform UK announced Dave Holland as their candidate. He grew up in the constituency and in January 2023 had been selected by Reform UK to stand in the constituency at the next general election. Holland ran unsuccessfully as a Reform UK candidate in the 2023 Central Bedfordshire Council elections for the Meppershall and Shillington ward. Cade Sibley was selected as the Green Party candidate.

The chairman of Central Bedfordshire Council, Gareth Mackey, an independent councillor, also announced his candidacy on 12 June, saying he would stand as an independent, having previously announced he would run in the constituency at the 2024 general election. He had run unsuccessfully as a Conservative candidate in the 2015 Central Bedfordshire Council election, before being elected as an independent councillor in 2019.

== Campaign ==
Some media sources speculated that the Liberal Democrats would perform strongly, but reported that Labour also expected they could win the seat.

On 12 June, Reform UK and the Reclaim Party announced a mutual co-operation agreement for two upcoming by-elections, whereby Reform UK would stand in Mid Bedfordshire and Reclaim would stand in Uxbridge and South Ruislip.

On 13 June, Labour Party National Campaign Coordinator Shabana Mahmood ruled out a Lib–Lab pact. Leader of the Liberal Democrats Sir Ed Davey had done the same on 10 June. By 19 June, both parties had confirmed candidates.

Labour and the Lib Dems both launched serious campaigns for the seat, triggering what was described by journalist Katy Balls as a "toxic power tussle", and speculation that the split of the anti-Conservative vote may allow the Conservatives to retain the seat.

The Conservative campaign was reportedly "tainted" by Nadine Dorries. On 1 July an opinion poll suggested that the Conservatives could see their biggest by-election defeat in British history.

On 21 September it was reported that Labour had issued a cease and desist letter to the Lib Dems, accusing them of publishing "lies and smears" about the Labour candidate in their election leaflets, and using a misleading bar chart showing the Lib Dems as neck-and-neck with the Conservatives, when polling put them in third place. In response the Lib Dems accused Labour of a "dirty tricks" campaign. Labour threatened to report the Liberal Democrats to the police alleging two breaches of the Representation of the People Act.

The National Health Service and affordable housing were reported to be key issues in the campaign. One local campaign issue was the need for a GP surgery in the new town of Wixams.

== Polling ==
Dates conducted	Pollster	Client	Sample size	Con	Lab	Lib Dems	Green	Gareth Mackey	Reform UK	True & Fair	Others	Lead
20 Oct 2023	2023 by-election		40,720	31.1%	34.1%	23.1%	1.8%	4.6%	3.7%	0.2%	1.4%	3.0
12–14 Sep 2023	Survation	Labour Together	559	29%	29%	22%	2%	6%	7%	4%	–	Tie
1 Jul 2023	Opinium	Labour Party	724	24%	28%	15%	–	19%	10%	–	–	4
12 Dec 2019	2019 general election		64,717	59.8%	21.7%	12.6%	3.8%	–	–	–	2.1%	38.1

== Result ==
Bar chart of the election result.

2023 Mid Bedfordshire by-election
Party	Candidate	Votes	%	±%
Labour	Alistair Strathern	13,872	34.1	+12.4
Conservative	Festus Akinbusoye	12,680	31.1	–28.7
Liberal Democrats	Emma Holland-Lindsay	9,420	23.1	+10.5
Independent	Gareth Mackey	1,865	4.6	New
Reform	Dave Holland	1,487	3.7	New
Green	Cade Sibley	732	1.8	–2.0
Monster Raving Loony	Ann Kelly	249	0.6	–0.2
English Democrat	Antonio Vitiello	107	0.3	New
CPA	Sid Cordle	101	0.2	New
True & Fair Party	Alan Victor	93	0.2	New
Heritage	Alberto Thomas	63	0.2	New
No description	Prince Ankit Love, Emperor of India	27	0.1	New
Mainstream	Chris Rooney	24	0.1	New
Majority		1,192	3.0	N/A
Turnout		40,720	44.1	–29.6
Labour gain from Conservative		Swing	+20.5	

A similar substantial swing, resulting in a Labour gain from the Conservatives, was seen in the concurrent Tamworth by-election. Psephologist John Curtice determined these results to be ''one of worst nights any government has endured".

== Previous result ==
General election 2019: Mid Bedfordshire
Party	Candidate	Votes	%	±%
Conservative	Nadine Dorries	38,692	59.8	–1.8
Labour	Rhiannon Meades	14,028	21.7	–6.7
Liberal Democrats	Rachel McGann	8,171	12.6	+6.6
Green	Gareth Ellis	2,478	3.8	+1.0
Independent	Alan Victor	812	1.3	New
Monster Raving Loony	Ann Kelly	536	0.8	–0.3
Majority		24,664	38.1	+4.9
Turnout		64,717	73.7	–3.0
Conservative hold		Swing	+2.4	

== See also ==
- 2023 Tamworth by-election, held on the same day
- List of United Kingdom by-elections (2010–present)
