= Ferranti (surname) =

Ferranti is an Italian surname. Notable people with the surname Ferranti or de Ferranti include:

== Ferranti ==
- Ferrante Ferranti (born 1960), French photographer and architect
- Gina Ferranti, American actress
- Marie Ferranti (born 1962), French writer
- Redento D. Ferranti (1923–2008), Italian-born American pulmonologist

== de Ferranti family ==
- Marco Aurelio Zani de Ferranti (1801–1878), Italian classical guitarist and composer
  - Juliana Szczepanowska de Ferranti (1825–1906), British concert pianist and author, daughter-in-law of Marco de Ferranti and mother of Sebastian de Ferranti
    - Sebastian Ziani de Ferranti (1864–1930), British electrical engineer and inventor, founder of what would later become the Ferranti company
    - Gertrude de Ferranti (1869–1959), Welsh activist for affordable and accessible electricity in the home, wife of Sebastian de Ferranti
      - Vincent Ziani de Ferranti (1893–1980), chairman of the Ferranti company from 1930 to 1963, son of Sebastian and Gertrude de Ferranti
        - Basil de Ferranti (1930–1988), British businessman and politician, son of Vincent de Ferranti
        - Valerie Hunter Gordon (née Ziani de Ferranti) (1921–2016), British inventor, granddaughter of Sebastian and Gertrude de Ferranti

== See also ==
- Ferranti
- Ferrante
