= Valerie Hunter Gordon =

British inventor (1921–2016)

- Born: Valerie Ziani de Ferranti; 7 December 1921; Baslow, Derbyshire, England
- Died: 16 October 2016 (aged 94); Beauly, Scotland
- Occupation: Inventor
- Known for: Inventing the first disposable nappy system

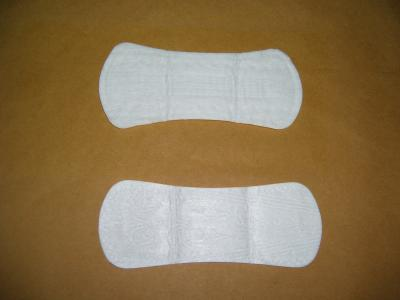
Sanitary towels/pads

Valerie Hunter Gordon (née Valerie Ziani de Ferranti; 7 December 1921 – 16 October 2016) was the British inventor of PADDI, a sustainable nappy system considered to be the world's first disposable nappy, and Nikini, an early sanitary towel system.

== Development of the modern nappy ==
In 1947, after having her third baby, Valerie Hunter Gordon started developing a product that could prevent the hours of drudgery and wasted resources spent on washing, drying and ironing the traditional towelling nappy. "I just didn't want to wash them," she explained. "It was awful labour." Valerie created her nappies, being a two-part system, consisting of a biodegradable disposable pad (made of cellulose wadding covered with cotton wool) worn inside an adjustable waterproof garment (the PADDI) with press-studs that was not thrown out.

Initially, she used old military parachutes for the garment where some lettering from the parachutes was visible on early versions. She experienced great demand for her invention from friends, particularly other army mothers. Initially, the big manufacturers were unable to see the commercial possibilities of disposable nappies though, and Valerie made over 400 PADDIs herself using her sewing machine at the kitchen table. She sold these for 5 shillings each. Latterly, the then newly created material PVC was used for the garment.

Valerie applied for the patent in April 1948, which was later granted for the PADDI garment in the UK in October 1949, but not for the disposal pad inserts. Valerie unsuccessfully approached several companies for help to make the product on a larger commercial scale. She had approached the nappy manufacturers Robinson & Sons of Chesterfield who were initially wary following an earlier unsuccessful trial, but a chance meeting between Valerie's father, Vincent Ziani de Ferranti, and Sir Robert Robinson at a Royal Society dinner then led to her signing a contract with the company on 8 November 1949.

In 1950, Boots agreed to sell PADDI across their branches on a nationwide basis. In 1951, the US patent for the PADDI was granted, and corresponding patents in other territories around the world. The PADDI was displayed at the Mothercraft Exhibition in Westminster in 1950, and then at the Ideal Home Exhibition in 1952. The BBC featured the invention as one of the six most interesting products at the show, and 750,000 packs had been sold by the end of that year. Shortly after that, Playtex and several other large international companies tried unsuccessfully to buy out Robinson & Sons. PADDI sales reached the six million mark by 1960, and the product was very successful for many years until the advent of Pamper's all-in-one nappies, in which plastic is thrown out together with the wadding, a concept which has been criticised by environmental groups as unsustainable.

== Nikini sanitary towel system ==
Following the success of the PADDI, Valerie went on to have three more children and relocate to Beauly when her Scottish husband Patrick Hunter Gordon joined his father Samuel Hunter Gordon in running the family engineering business AI Welders in Inverness. From there, she travelled back and forth to the Robinsons headquarters, where she developed the PADDI design and designed other products. She also created the Nikini sanitary towel system for women, the pad for which may be considered the world's first modern sanitary towel. The name Nikini was a combination of Knicker and Bikini, describing the mini knicker style of the product. Rather to her surprise Nikini earned more royalties overall than Paddi, though as she reflected, "there are probably more menstruating women in the world than incontinent babies."

== Personal life ==
Valerie Hunter Gordon was the granddaughter of domestic electrical pioneer and inventor Sebastian Ziani de Ferranti and Gertrude de Ferranti, the founder of British electrical engineering firm Ferranti, great-great-granddaughter of Italian classical guitarist and composer Marco Aurelio Zani de Ferranti and the sister of Basil de Ferranti. Her maternal great-grandmother, Juliana Scott, was a concert pianist and author.

She attended the Convent of the Sacred Heart school, in Roehampton.

In 1940, Valerie married the decorated Royal Engineer, Major Patrick Hunter Gordon. Patrick and Valerie's father were involved in the retreat from Dunkirk and her father led a group of soldiers home to safety riding discarded motorbikes through the Spanish border, managing to arriving home just in time for the wedding.

She died on 16 October 2016 at the age of 94 and was survived by six children, 19 grandchildren and 16 great-grandchildren.
