= Electric transient =

Electric transient may refer to:

Physical phenomena:

- Transient response
- Transient (oscillation)
- Transient recovery voltage
- Voltage spike
- Voltage droop
- Inrush current

Software:

- SPICE transient simulation mode
