= Robert Fraser (ITV) =

Australian journalist

Sir Robert Fraser OBE

Director-General of the Central Office of Information
- In office 1946–1954
- Preceded by: Eric Bamford
- Succeeded by: Sir Thomas Fife Clark

Personal details
- Born: Robert Brown Fraser; 26 September 1904 Adelaide, South Australia, Australia
- Died: 20 January 1985 London, England
- Education: University of Melbourne; London School of Economics
- Occupation: Journalist, civil servant
- Known for: First Director-General of the Independent Television Authority
- Awards: OBE; Knight Bachelor

Sir Robert Brown Fraser, OBE (26 September 1904 – 20 January 1985) was an Australian who, in the United Kingdom, worked as a journalist, civil servant and as the first Director General of the British Independent Television Authority (ITA).

== Biography ==
Born in Adelaide, Australia in 26 September 1904, Fraser graduated BA from the University of Melbourne, where he was resident at Trinity College from 1924 to 1926. Whilst in college, he was elected Secretary of the Trinity College Dialectic Society, and won numerous prizes, including the Wigram Allen Essay Prize (1924), the Leeper Debating Prize (1924 and 1925), and the President's Medal for Oratory (1925). He left with his parents, Mr and Mrs Reginald Fraser of Mt Lofty, South Australia, for the United Kingdom in 1927 for further study at the London School of Economics.

He worked as a writer for the Daily Herald newspaper, becoming its leader writer in 1930, and unsuccessfully attempting to get elected to Parliament in 1935, standing for the Labour Party in York. At the onset of the Second World War in 1939, Fraser joined the Ministry of Information where he became Director of Publications in 1941, launching a successful series of informative booklets about the war effort. In 1945, he was appointed Production Controller, serving until 1946 when he became Director-General of the Central Office of Information; he remained in that office until 1954. For his war-time service, he was appointed OBE in 1944 and knighted in 1949.

From 1954 to 1970, Fraser was the inaugural Director-General of the Independent Television Authority, where he worked closely with four of its chairman and, according to The Times "most creatively" with the first, Sir Kenneth Clark; the same newspaper considered him an "architect and master-builder ... guide philosopher" of independent television in Britain. From 1971 to 1974, he was chairman of Independent Television News (ITN).

Fraser died on 20 January 1985.

Cultural offices
Preceded by Harold Bishop	President of the Television Society; 1963–1964	Succeeded by Neil Sutherland
Media offices
Preceded by New office	Director-General of the Independent Television Authority; 1954–1970	Succeeded by Brian Young
