= Patrick Hunter Gordon =

Scottish soldier and electrical engineer

Major Patrick Hunter Gordon CBE MC FRSE (6 December 1916 – 28 March 1978) was a Scottish soldier and electrical engineer. He was managing director of two engineering firms, AI Welders and Cable Belt.

== Life ==
Patrick Hunter Gordon was born on 6 December 1916 in Inverness, the son of Samuel Gordon Hunter (born 1877) and his wife Clare Agnes Johnston, who was from County Down. He was educated at Cargilfield Preparatory School in Edinburgh and Oundle School in Northamptonshire, before going on to study Mechanical Sciences at Trinity Hall, Cambridge, where he graduated BA (1938) and MA (Cantab).

He next undertook military training at the Royal Military Academy Sandhurst, joining the Royal Engineers in 1936. In the Second World War he was located at Fort Hahenberg, before moving to Brillon near Lille on the Maginot Line in March 1940. In June 1948, after the war was over, he became an instructor at Camberley Staff College.

He died in a car accident on 28 March 1978 and was buried at Tomnahurich in Inverness.

== Family ==
In 1940 he married Valerie de Ferranti (granddaughter of Sebastian Ziani de Ferranti, founder of Ferranti). Valerie Hunter Gordon came to fame in 1947 as the inventor of one of the world's first disposable nappies, the PADDI.
