= High-voltage circuit breaker =

High-voltage electrical circuit breaker used in power transmission networks

A high-voltage circuit breaker is designed to make, carry, and interrupt electric currents under its rated voltage. The rated voltage is "the maximum system voltage for which the equipment is designed," according to the definition given by the International Electrotechnical Commission (IEC). According to the IEC., a high-voltage circuit breaker operates both:

- under normal operating conditions, for example, to connect or disconnect a power line in an electrical network;
- under specified abnormal conditions, particularly to clear a short circuit on the network caused by lightning (see also the specific section) or other causes.

Because of its characteristics, a circuit breaker is the essential switching device for protecting a high-voltage network, as it is the only device capable of interrupting a short-circuit current and thus preventing equipment connected to the network from being damaged by such a fault.

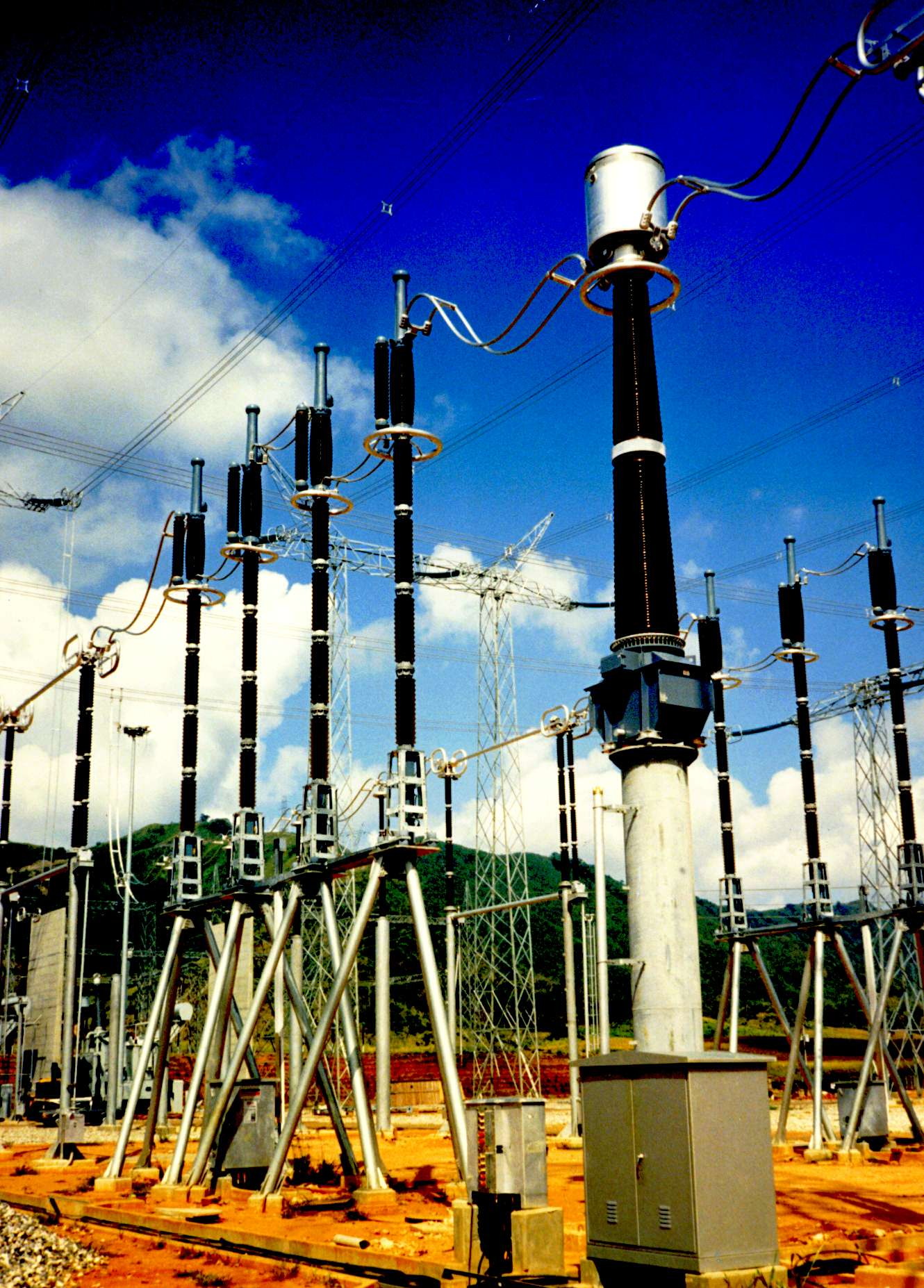
Figure 1: 800 kV circuit breaker in Venezuela

== Principle of operation ==
The interruption of an electric current by a high-voltage circuit breaker is achieved by separating contacts in a gas (air, SF_{6}, or natural-origin gases) or in another insulating medium (oil or vacuum). Immediately after contact separation, the current continues to flow in the circuit through an electric arc established between the breaker contacts.

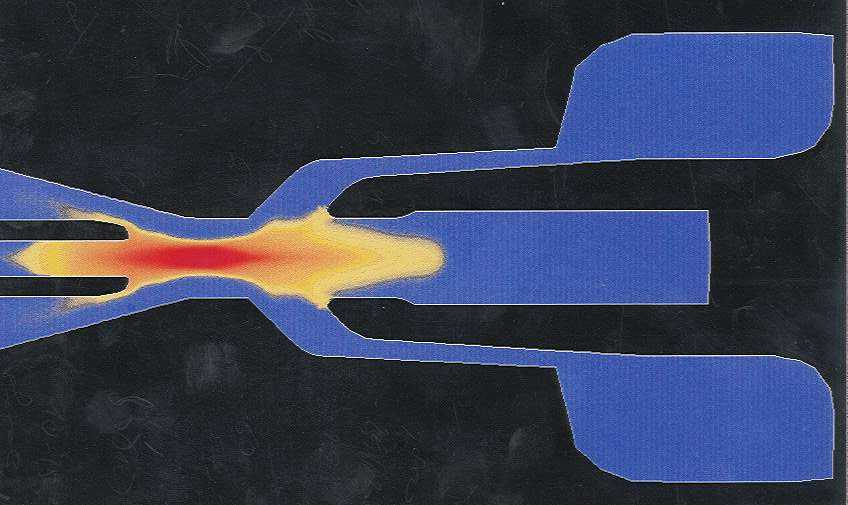
Figure 2: Electric arc between the arcing contacts of a high-voltage circuit breaker

Today, high-voltage circuit breakers 72.5 kV to 1200 kV mainly use gas or oil for insulation and interruption. Vacuum interruption technology is limited mainly to medium-voltage applications, although recent developments exist for rated voltages of 84 kV or 145 kV. For example, a vacuum circuit breaker model has been designed for a rated voltage of 145 kV and uses a naturally occurring gas for insulation outside of the vacuum interrupters.

In gas circuit breakers, the current is cut off when sufficient gas flow is applied to the electric arc to cool and interrupt it.

Under normal conditions, the gas contained in the circuit breaker is insulating and withstands the network voltage connected to its terminals. When the breaker contacts separate, the gap between the contacts is subjected to a strong electric field. The current then flows through an arc, which is a plasma (or ionized gas) composed of decomposed gas molecules, electrons, and ions. The temperature of the arc becomes extremely high and may reach 20000K or more at its core, depending, among other factors, on the magnitude of the short-circuit current, the type of interrupting medium, and the cooling rate of the arc. Under the effect of the blowing applied to the arc during breaker operation, the arc temperature decreases, electrons and ions recombine, and the fluid regains its insulating properties. Current interruption is then achieved.

For high-voltage circuit breakers, the selected interruption principle is current interruption at the moment when the current passes through zero (which occurs every ten milliseconds in the case of alternating current at convert 50 Hz. This is because it is at this moment that the power supplied to the arc by the network is at its minimum (this apparent power supplied is even zero at the moment when the instantaneous current value is zero). With sufficient gas flow, this time interval—when the current is small—can therefore be used to cool the arc sufficiently so that its temperature decreases and the space between the contacts becomes insulating again.

== Interruption techniques ==
The first high-voltage circuit breakers, introduced at the end of the 1890s and the early 20th century, used oil or compressed air for interruption. The first circuit-breaker patent for high voltage, based on the separation of two contacts in oil (and in air), was filed by Sebastian Ziani de Ferranti in July 1895. This principle was later improved and led to the development of oil circuit breakers. Interruption in atmospheric air (a naturally occurring gas) was developed for high voltage A, the idea being to lengthen the arc sufficiently in air to cool it, extinguish it, and then withstand the network voltage.

The oil-based switching technique was later replaced by interruption in compressed air, SF_{6} gas, naturally occurring gases, and vacuum.

=== Oil circuit breakers ===
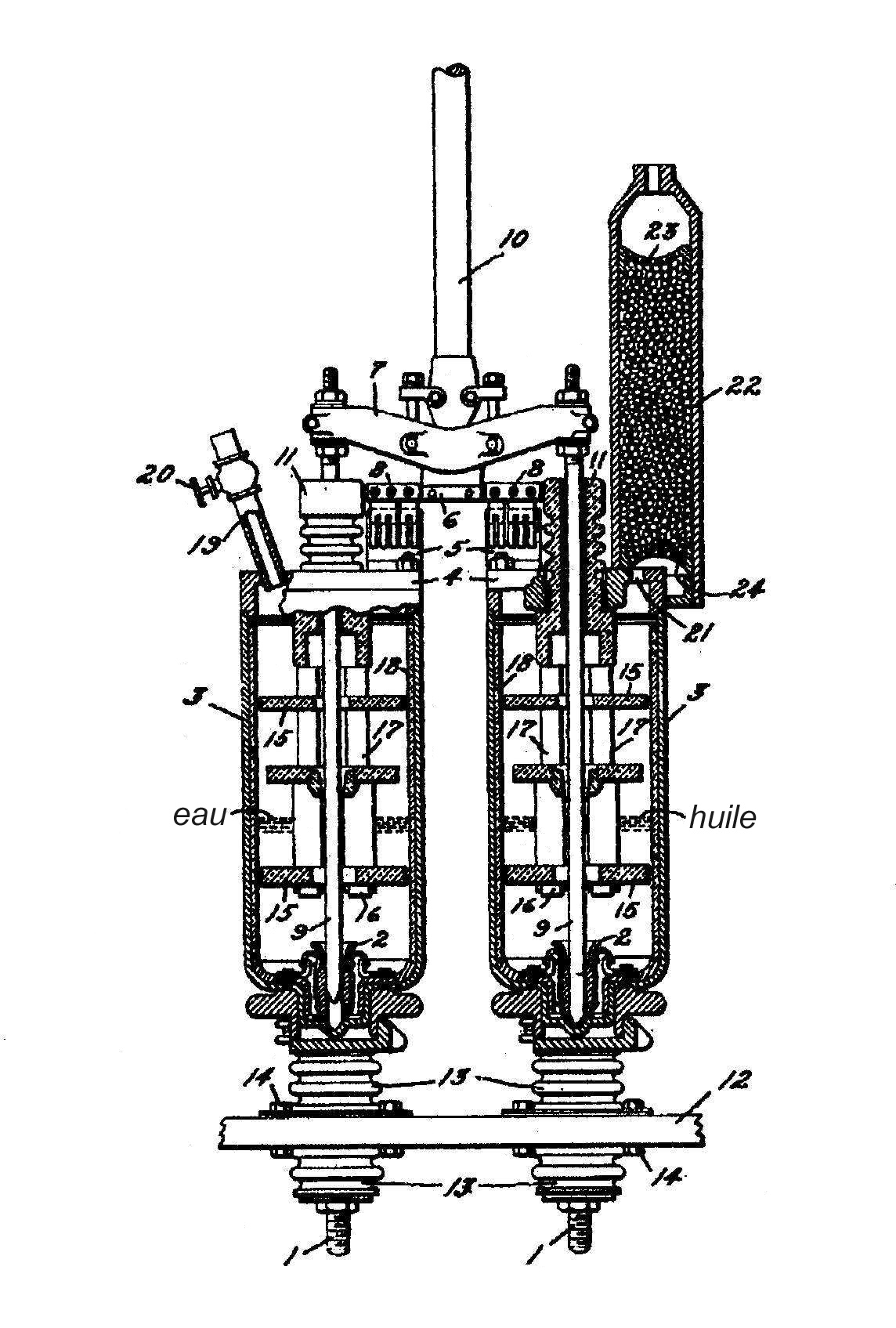
Figure 3: Patent for a water- and oil-based circuit breaker, filed in 1923

Interruption in oil became widely used in high voltage after first being developed in medium voltage(or high voltage A). Under the action of the electric arc, the oil decomposes and several type of gases are produced (mainly hydrogen and acetylene). The energy from the arc is used to decompose and evaporate the oil, which cools the medium between the contacts and consequently interrupts the current as it passes through zero.

The first oil circuit breakers had interrupting contacts immersed in oil contained in a metal tank at ground potential, hence the name dead tank. They are called "large-volume oil circuit breakers". Some are still in service today, for example, in the United States.

Subsequently, in the 1950s, "low-volume oil circuit breakers" were designed to reduce the amount of oil required and, above all, to limit the fire risk inherent in bulk oil circuit breakers. The arc develops inside an insulating cylinder to limit its length and control as much as possible the energy contained in the arc. This energy is used to generate the blow-out by vaporizing the oil, as explained above. This technique, know as "self-blow-out," was later used for SF6 gas circuit breakers. It has been applied for rated voltage up to 765 kV and very high fault currents of up to 50 kA.

The main disadvantages of these circuit breakers were the need for many interrupting units in series (to maintain voltage) and the need for extensive and delicate maintenance (replacement of used oil). They have been replaced by SF_{6} gas circuit breakers, which require little maintenance and have a long service life.

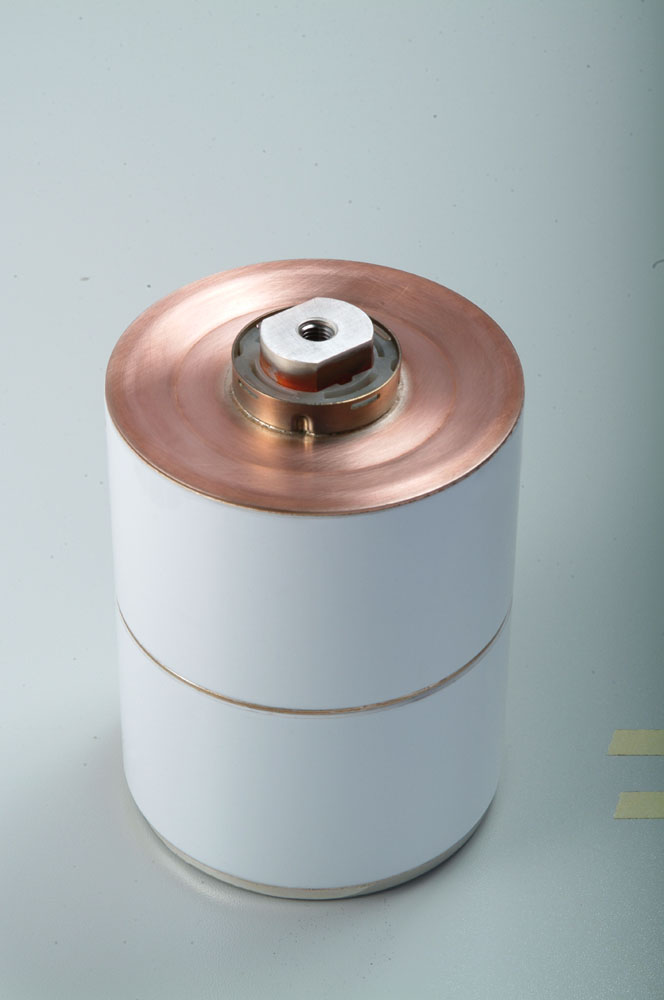
Figure 4: Vacuum interrupter for a medium-voltage circuit breaker

=== Vacuum tube circuit breakers ===
The first research and patents on vacuum interrupters (switches) were conducted by the California Institute of Technology around 1926. The first industrial applications were realized in the late 1950s when the technological difficulties of implementation were resolved, particularly the guarantee of a high vacuum for at least twenty years, which requires perfect sealing of the interrupter.

In a vacuum circuit breaker, the arc is sustained by particles emitted from the contacts. The high dielectric strength achieved in a high vacuum allows the device to withstand the transient recovery voltage between contacts after current interruption. The passage of current through specially shaped contacts generates a magnetic field that causes the arc to rotate and prevents it from remaining attached to the same contact surface. This avoids melting of the arc contacts and excessive production of metallic particles that would limit the dielectric strength after current interruption.

Circuit breakers incorporating vacuum interrupters are currently in service at 84 kV in Japan. The breaking capacity of a vacuum circuit breaker can reach 63 kA or even more. A model of circuit breaker model with a single interrupting unit per pole manufactured by Siemens allows vacuum interruption up to 145 kV. Research is ongoing to design of vacuum circuit breakers with higher rated voltages, up to a rated voltage of 363 kV and a breaking capacity of 80 kA.

=== Compressed-air or natural-gas circuit breakers ===
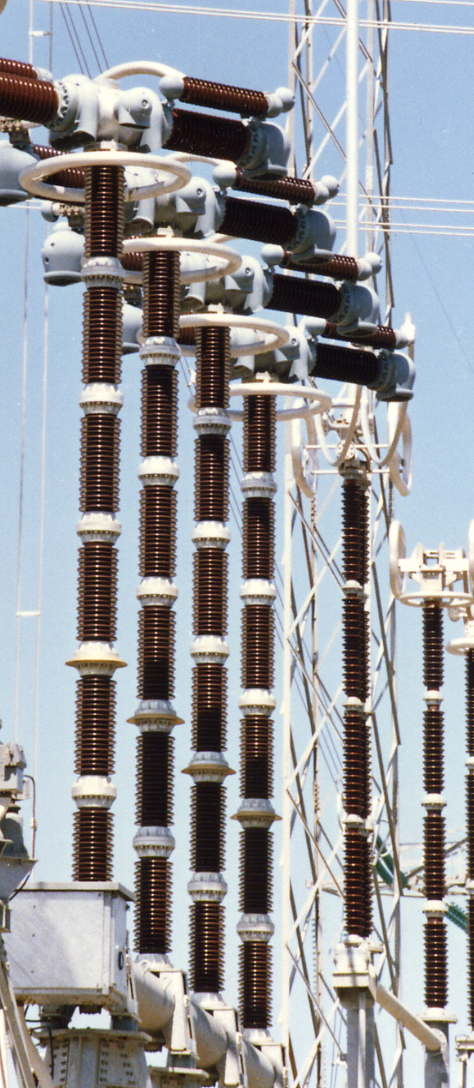
Figure 5: Compressed-air circuit breaker

The gas contained in compressed air circuit breakers is maintained at high pressure (20 bars (2,000 kPa) to 35 bars (3,500 kPa)) using a mechanical compressor. This high pressure ensures dielectric strength and causes the blowing needed to extinguish the arc.

The intense gas blast used in these breakers made it possible to obtain very high performance (currents interrupted up to 100 kA at high voltage) and very short fault-clearing times, allowing good stability of power networks during faults.

For a long time they had a monopoly on very high performance and were the preferred choice in very high voltage networks during the 1960s and 1970s, particularly in North America.

One drawback of compressed-air circuit breakers is the very high noise level during opening. In addition, they require periodic maintenance, particularly of their compressors. This explains why they have gradually been replaced by a new generation of circuit breakers: SF_{6} gas circuit breakers.

The compressed-air technique is still the only one capable of achieving the highest breaking capacities (275 kA at 36 kV), which are required for generator circuit breakers.

Research and development activities are currently being conducted by industry regarding the use of nitrogen (a natural-origin gas) as an interrupting medium without compressors, particularly in gas-insulated substations.

== High-voltage SF_{6} (sulfur hexafluoride) circuit breakers ==
=== History ===
The use of SF_{6} gas for insulation was patented in the United States by Franklin Cooper of General Electric in 1938. Its use for current interruption was also claimed in 1938 in a German patent by Vitaly Grosse of AEG (Allgemeine Elektrizitäts-Gesellschaft).

The first industrial application of SF_{6} gas for switching dates from 1953, when Westinghouse used it for high-voltage load-break switches rated from 15 kV to 161 kV with a breaking capacity of 600 A.

The first high-voltage SF_{6} gas circuit breaker was developed in 1956 by Westinghouse, but the breaking capacity was limited to 5 kA at a voltage of 115 kV (1,000 MVA), and the device required several interrupting units in series per pole to achieve the required performance (six interrupting chambers per pole).

At the same time, in 1957, the Ateliers de Constructions Électriques de Delle built a 23 kV, 250 MVA circuit breaker for distribution switchgear, followed by a grounded-tank (dead tank) circuit breaker for a 25 kV locomotive with an apparent power of 200 MVA.

It was not until 1959 that Westinghouse produced the first high-breaking-capacity SF_{6} circuit breaker: 41.8 kA at 138 kV (10,000 MVA) and 37.6 kA at 230 kV (15,000 MVA). This three-pole operated circuit breaker included three interrupting chambers in series per pole. It operated with an SF_{6} pressure of 13.5 bar relative (above atmospheric pressure) for blowing and 3 bar relative to ensure dielectric strength. Good electrical performance was achieved thanks to the high pressures used; however, these devices presented a risk of SF_{6} gas liquefaction at temperatures below 5 °C. For certain climates, it was therefore necessary to plan for the maintenance of the temperature of the high-pressure tank.

The excellent electrical properties of SF_{6} led to large-scale production of the gas during the 1960s and its use for the development of high-voltage circuit breakers at increasingly high rated voltages. Since 2009 in China, high-voltage SF_{6} circuit breakers have been designed for rated voltages up to 800 kV, and later 1,100 kV.

The development of high-voltage networks and the need to bring these networks into urban and industrial areas led to the design of new compact types of high-voltage substations known as "gas-insulated" or "metal-enclosed". To ensure insulation, the naturally occurring air was replaced by SF_{6} gas, which has very good dielectric properties, which has greatly reducing the bulk of high-voltage equipment.

The application of this technology in high-voltage systems made it possible, as early as 1966, to build the first metal-enclosed substation as an experimental 220kV prototype installed at Le Plessis-Gassot near Paris, and the first metal-enclosed circuit breaker in 1967 in Levallois-Perret, followed in 1969 by the installation at the Vaise substation in Lyon.

The global warming potential (GWP) of SF_{6} is more than 31,000 times that of carbon dioxide, when considering its effect over 500 years. In the context of climate-change mitigation, electricity suppliers are increasingly seeking to reduce the use of SF_{6} as an insulating medium for high-voltage circuit breakers. New metal-enclosed stations are designed to operate with naturally occurring gases such as dinitrogen, also due to environmental policies. In this movement, the 110 kV electrical substation Virkkala in Finland is being modernized to allow the use of insulating media without greenhouse gases.

=== Self-pneumatic circuit breaker ===
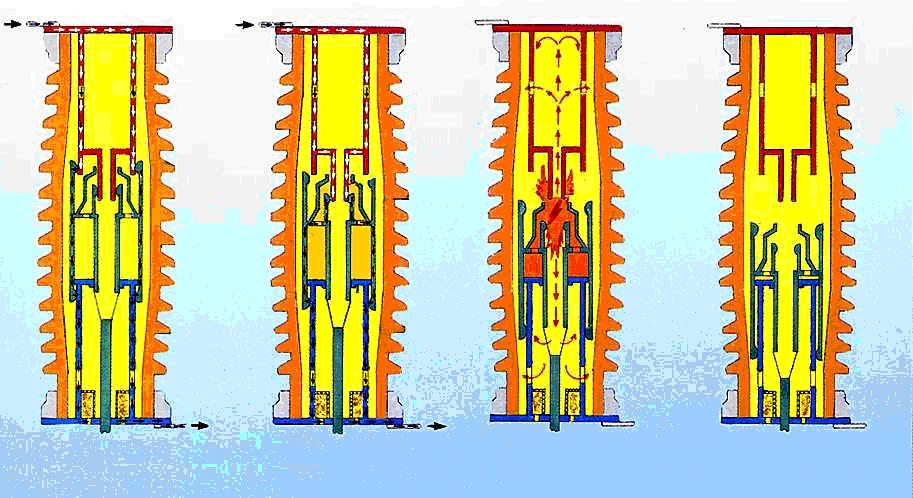
Figure 6: Principle of self-pneumatic circuit breakers

The principle of the self-blast (self-pneumatic) technique was developed during the 1970s and early 1980s to meet the most demanding specifications and to develop increasingly high-performance equipment.

Figure 6 recalls schematically the principle of operation of these devices.

When the circuit breaker is in the closed position, the current flows through so-called 'permanent' contacts, which are located on the outer diameter of the active part. During a tripping operation, the moving part moves downward, resulting in the separation of the permanent contacts. The current then flows through another series of contacts called "arc contacts". When the mobile part made a sufficient stroke, the arc contacts separate, which causes an arc to ignite between these contacts. The arc contacts are made with tungsten-based materials (such as an alloy of copper and tungsten) so that they can withstand the effects of the electric arc without damage.

The arc contacts are made from materials based on tungsten (for example copper–tungsten alloys) to withstand the effects of the electric arc.

During the opening operation, the circuit breaker itself produces the compression of the gas necessary for the blowing of the arc. The relative displacement of the blowing cylinder with respect to the fixed piston creates an overpressure in the cylinder that escapes through the nozzle and cools the arc, allowing it to be extinguished.

The development of new generations of high-performance SF_{6} gas circuit breakers led in the 1970s to the supremacy of SF_{6} gas devices in the 7.2 kV to 245 kV range.

From 1983, the production of single-cut 245 kV circuit breakers (with one cutoff element per pole) and the corresponding 420 kV, 550 kV, and 800 kV devices led to the dominance of the use of SF6 gas in the entire high voltage range.

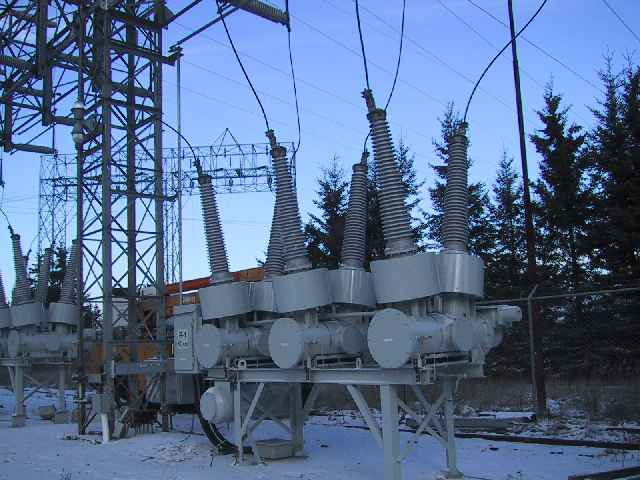
Figure 7: 115 kV circuit breaker in Canada

From a technical standpoint, several characteristics of SF_{6} gas circuit breakers can explain their success:

- the simplicity of the interrupting chamber, which does not require an auxiliary chamber (unlike older compressed-air devices);
- the autonomy of the apparatus provided by the self-blast technique (no gas compressor required);
- the ability to obtain the highest performance, up to 63 kA, with a limited number of interrupting chambers;
- short fault-clearing times, typically 2 to 2.5 cycles at extra-high voltage;
- high electrical endurance, ensuring a service life of at least 25 years;
- reduced size made possible by gas-insulated substations;
- the possibility of installing closing resistors or performing synchronized switching operations to limit overvoltages;
- operational safety;
- low noise levels

In the early 1980s, a new generation of very high-voltage SF_{6} gas circuit breakers was developed, with a simplified geometry that integrates a closing resistance inserter in the cutoff chamber. In this case, the resistor is located at the end of the chamber, inside a metal casing, but it is insulated from it by the SF_{6} gas contained in the pole (Figure 7). This resistance is used to limit overvoltages in the network during the closing or reclosing of long lines at very high voltage.

The reduction in the number of interrupting chambers led to a great simplification of the devices by reducing the number of moving parts, the number of sealing joints, etc. As a result, the reliability of the equipment improved, in addition to the increase in breaking capacity.

=== Self-blast circuit breaker ===
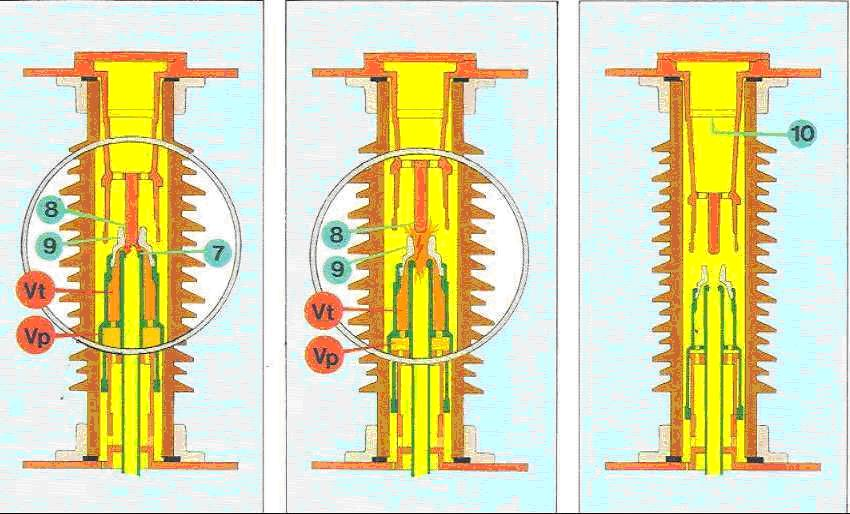
Figure 8: Principle of self-blast circuit breakers

The period 1984–2000 was marked by the strong development of computational and modeling methods for SF_{6} gas circuit breakers. Thanks to the use of these methods, new devices with low operating energy requirements were developed.

Self-blast circuit breakers are characterized by the significant use of arc energy for interruption: the self-blast process has largely replaced the self-pneumatic blast technique for interrupting high currents. The interruption of weak currents is always obtained by self-pneumatic blasting, since the arc energy is not sufficient to contribute to the gas flow.

Figure 8 shows that during the high-current phase, the arc initiated between contacts (7) and (8) transfers a large part of its energy to the thermal expansion volume Vt. At the zero crossing of the current, the overpressure thus created is released through the insulating nozzle (9) and inside the mobile contact (7). This double blowing allows the arc to be efficiently cooled and interrupted. For the interruption of weak currents, an autopneumatic blast is produced in the volume Vp, the compressed gas blowing the arc via the volume Vt.

Figure 9: Principle of self-blast and double-volume circuit breakers

An evolution of self-blast interrupting chambers consisted of introducing a valve (V) between the expansion volume and the compression volume. This principle is illustrated in Figure 9.

In low current shutdown, the valve opens under the effect of the overpressure generated in the compression volume. The arc is then blown out as in an autopneumatic circuit breaker, thanks to the compression of the gas.

In the case of interrupting high currents, the arc energy produces a strong overpressure in the expansion volume, which causes the valve (V) to close and isolates the expansion volume from the compression volume. The overpressure required for interruption is obtained by an optimal use of the thermal effect and the "plug effect," which occurs when the arc cross-section significantly restricts the escape of gas through the nozzle.

Figure 10: Self-blast circuit breaker with double contact motion

To avoid excessive energy consumption from gas compression, a relief valve limits the overpressure in the compression volume to the level necessary for the interruption of low short-circuit currents.

A more recent development of self-blast interrupting chambers has been to reduce the kinetic energy that must be provided by the operating mechanism during the opening of the circuit breaker. This is achieved by moving the two arcing contacts in the opposite direction, so that the speed of each moving part is half that of a conventional device. In this configuration, the moving mass is increased, but the maneuvering energy is notably reduced, given that the kinetic energy is proportional to the square of the velocity. This principle is illustrated in Figure 10.

The self-blast interruption principle made it possible to use low-energy spring-operated mechanisms for operating high-voltage circuit breakers. Self-blast devices replaced autopneumatic devices between 1990 and 2003, first at 72.5 kV, and later from 145 kV to 800 kV.

== Generator circuit breakers ==
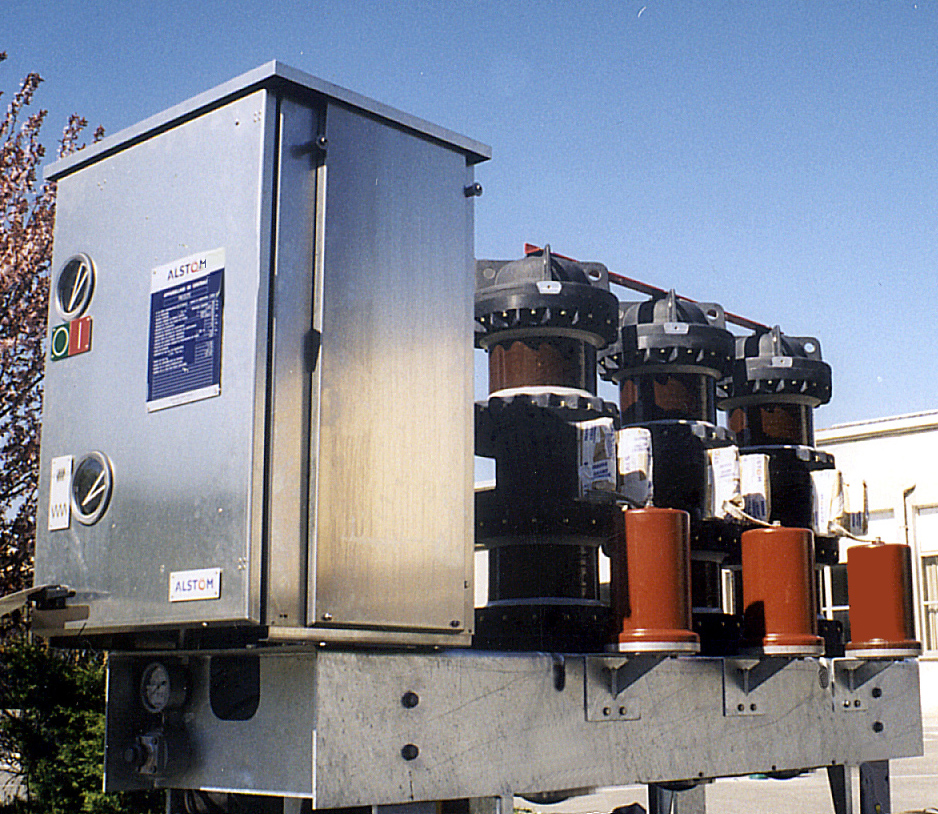
Figure 11: 17.5 kV, 63 kA generator circuit breaker with its operating mechanism in the foreground

These circuit breakers are connected between a power station generator and the transformer that steps up the voltage prior to transmitting electrical energy via the electrical grid.

Generator circuit breakers are typically used at the output of high-power generators (up to 1,800 MVA, in the case of nuclear power plants) to provide safe, fast and economical protection.

These circuit breakers have a specific design because they must be able to transmit very high currents in continuous operation (6,300 A to 40,000 A) and also have a very strong breaking power. In addition, they must be capable of interrupting high currents with a transient recovery voltage (TRV) that is higher than that of distribution devices used in the same voltage range.

SF_{6} gas circuit breakers are used when the breaking power does not exceed 160 kA or 210 kA; beyond this level, compressed-air circuit breakers provide the highest breaking capacities that may be required, up to 275 kA.

The international standard IEC/IEEE 62271-37-013, Edition 2.0 applies to generator circuit breakers. It defines the performance requirements and technical specifications for these circuit breakers. The standard also covers specific applications, such as power plants with several generators connected to a surge transformer, pumped-storage hydroelectric power plants, and wind farms.

== Evolution of high-voltage circuit breakers ==
The current evolution of high-voltage circuit breakers is characterized by:

- the widespread use of high breaking capacities (50 kA and 63 kA);
- the reduction of operating energies;
- the reduction in the number of interrupting chambers per pole;
- the introduction of electronics, among other things for self-diagnostic functions;
- environmental considerations regarding SF_{6} gas:
  - the reduction of leaks and leakage risks in circuit breakers during system design;
  - the implementation of procedures for the verification, detection, location, and repair of leaks during the product's operational life;
  - the recycling of gases at the end of the circuit breaker's service life.

Thanks to the implementation of principles concerning SF_{6} gas, its consequences are now better controlled.

== Performance of a high-voltage circuit breaker ==
The performance of high-voltage circuit breakers is defined in the international IEC and ANSI/IEEE standards. In this area, IEC standards are recognized in most countries around the world, whereas ANSI/IEEE standards are used primarily in North America (see external links for more information).

The IEC 62271-100 standard applies to high-voltage circuit breakers.

Like any high-voltage electrical device, a circuit breaker must have an adequate assigned isolation level, as well as an assigned permanent current in continuous services that ensures that the temperature of its parts does not exceed a standardized limit during continuous operation.

In addition, a circuit breaker must have a rated breaking capacity for the following cases:

- unloaded lines and unloaded cables;
- single capacitor banks;
- back-to-back capacitor banks;
- short circuits (single-phase fault, close-in line fault);
- out-of-phase conditions;
- inductive loads for circuit breakers that switch motors or switchyard reactors (IEC 62271-106 and IEC 62271-110 standards).

The main performance that characterizes a circuit breaker is its short-circuit breaking capacity, that is, the maximum current it is capable of interrupting at its rated voltage (the maximum system voltage for which the equipment is designed). The values of short-circuit breaking capacity, expressed in RMS value, typically range between 25 kA and 63 kA (except for generator circuit breakers). The short-circuit current that can be interrupted by a circuit breaker depends strongly on the voltage that reappears across the breaker terminals after current interruption. This voltage first recovers with high-frequency oscillations, known as the transient recovery voltage (TRV), and then varies according to the power system's industrial frequency.

A circuit breaker shall also be capable of establishing a short-circuit current whose peak value is normally equal to its short-circuit breaking capacity multiplied by 2.5 (for 50 Hz networks) or 2.6 (for 60 Hz networks).

In addition, high-voltage line circuit breakers must be capable of closing or reclosing lines without causing overvoltages on the electrical network. Two techniques are used to limit overvoltages: the insertion of a closing resistor or synchronized switching with respect to the voltage waveform, called the controlled switching. In the latter case, the objective is to establish the load current when the voltage on the source side of the circuit breaker is equal to the load voltage, for a capacitive load or for a transmission line.

The main objective of controlled switching is to minimize the magnitude of the inrush current when establishing capacitive current, or to minimize switching overvoltages when establishing inductive current. The method used to allow the controlled switching is to delay the operation.

These performances are verified by full-scale tests conducted in accordance with the IEC 62271 or IEEE series of standards in specialized laboratories. When the required power exceeds the capacity of the laboratory generators, it is necessary to use a so-called synthetic testing method, with separate current and voltage sources.

== Manufacturers and users ==
=== Manufacturers ===
The number of major producers of high-voltage circuit breakers is relatively small because many mergers and acquisitions were made in the 1990s and 2000s. For power transmission, the main manufacturers are ABB, Alstom Grid, Siemens, Toshiba, Mitsubishi, and HVB AE Power Systems (ex Hitachi). In the field of power distribution, the main additional manufacturers are Schneider Electric and Eaton Corporation / Cutler-Hammer.

=== Users ===
In high-voltage transmission systems, the main users are electricity generation companies such as EDF and electricity transmission operators such as RTE. Consolidations have occurred among users of high-voltage equipment following the liberalization of the electricity market, although several national markets have traditionally remained dominated by a few state-owned companies. Other major users include RWE and E.ON in Germany; Tokyo Electric Power Company in Japan; State Grid Corporation of China in China; Power Grid Corporation of India in India; Enel and Terna in Italy; Edelca in Venezuela; Furnas Centrais Elétricas in Brazil; Eskom in South Africa; Hydro-Québec and BC Hydro in Canada; and American Electric Power, Tennessee Valley Authority, and Bonneville Power Administration in the United States.

The situation is somewhat different in high-voltage A, where users also include large electricity distribution companies, such as EDF, as well as many industrial facilities supplied at voltages between 10 kV and 22 kV, or more rarely at high-voltage B levels. Railway companies are also major users of high-voltage electrical equipment.

It is in China that electricity consumption—and consequently the need for installed capacity and high-voltage circuit breakers—is increasing most rapidly. Installed capacity was 600,000 MW (megawatts) in 2006 and was expected to reach 1,300,000 MW by 2020. For comparison, a nuclear power plant unit supplies about 1,200 MW. To cope with the increase in consumption and transport electrical energy over long distances, China commissioned a 1 100 kV ultra-high voltage network in 2009.

In the future, India is also expected to be a very important market in terms of volume for high-voltage circuit breakers. This country plans a significant expansion of its 800 kV transmission network and commissioned a 1,200 kV transmission line in 2013, although this line initially operates at 400 kV,
