= Cornelius Gregg =

Irish civil servant

Sir Cornelius Joseph Gregg, KCB, KBE (26 January 1888 – 14 November 1959) was an Irish civil servant who primarily worked in the United Kingdom's civil service.

== Biography ==
Gregg was born on 26 January 1888 in Kilkenny, Ireland. He attended the local Christian Brothers School then Blackrock College, before completing a degree at University College Dublin. He moved to London and entered the civil service in 1911 as an official at the Inland Revenue. He transferred back to Ireland in 1920 to serve as private secretary to Hamar Greenwood, the chief secretary for Ireland. However, he disliked the use of the Black and Tans in the Irish War of Independence, and had resigned by the end of the year. He returned to Inland Revenue, where he was appointed assistant secretary in 1922, though was back in Ireland on secondment to the Department of Finance as secretary for establishment matters (1922 to 1924), where he was responsible for building a new civil service structure, which was modelled closely on Whitehall's.

In 1924, Gregg returned once more to Inland Revenue, where he was promoted to secretary in 1935 and subsequently served as deputy chairman of the Board of Inland Revenue, before becoming its chairman in 1942. His tenure coincided with the difficulties of the Second World War, the introduction of the Pay as You Earn (PAYE) income tax system, and the double taxation agreement with the United States. He retired to Ireland on retirement in 1948. For his services, Gregg had been appointed a Companion of the Order of the Bath (CB) in the 1932 Birthday Honours and was promoted to Knight Commander (KCB) in the 1944 New Year Honours; he was also appointed a Knight Commander of the Order of the British Empire (KBE) in the 1941 New Year Honours. He died 14 November 1959.

Government offices
Preceded by Sir Gerald Canny	Chairman, Board of Inland Revenue; 1942–1948	Succeeded by Sir Eric Bamford
