= Harold Bishop (engineer) =

British broadcasting engineer

Sir Harold Bishop, CBE

Sir Harold Bishop CBE (29 October 1900 – 22 October 1983) was a British broadcasting engineer. He was president of the Institution of Electrical Engineers for 1953–54.

He helped organize broadcasts by SHAEF. He was Chief Engineer at the BBC, where from 1952 to 1956 his title was Director of Technical Services and from 1956 to 1963 Director of Engineering.

He was knighted in 1955. In 1966, he presented the Bernard Price Memorial Lecture in South Africa.

== Notes ==
Cultural offices
Preceded by George Barnes	President of the Television Society; 1961–1962	Succeeded by Robert Fraser
