= Gerald Canny =

British civil servant

Sir Gerald Bain Canny, KCB, KBE (5 March 1881 – 16 February 1954) was a British civil servant.

Born on 5 March 1881, Canny attended Malvern College and Queens' College, Cambridge. He joined the civil service in 1904 as an official in the Inland Revenue. He was private secretary to the Chairman of the Board of Inland Revenue, Sir Robert Chalmers, when the Liberal Chancellor of the Exchequer David Lloyd George introduced land value taxation. Canny remained with the department, rising to serve as Deputy Chairman of the Board of Inland Revenue from 1935 to 1938 and then Chairman from 1938 to 1942. The latter part of his chairmanship entailed overseeing the introduction of the excess profits tax, war damage contribution and post-war credits to support the government's revenue during the Second World War. After he left the chairmanship in 1942, he held various other offices, including serving as chairman of the Tithe Redemption Commission, Controller of Matches, and (from 1945 to 1947) he was chairman of the London and South-Eastern Regional Board for Industry. He was appointed vice-chairman of the Royal Commission on Lotteries and Betting in 1949.

Canny was appointed a Companion of the Order of the Bath (CB) in the 1924 Birthday Honours, and was promoted to Knight Commander (KCB) in the 1939 Birthday Honours; he was also appointed a Knight Commander of the Order of the British Empire in the 1937 Coronation Honours. He died on 16 February 1954.

Government offices
| Preceded by Sir Edward Forber | Chairman, Board of Inland Revenue; 1938–1942 | Succeeded by Sir Cornelius Gregg |
