= Central Office of Information =

Former UK propaganda agency

Central Office of Information (COI)
- COI Logo

Department overview
- Formed: 1946
- Preceding Department: Ministry of Information
- Dissolved: 30 December 2011
- Superseding Department: Cabinet Office
- Jurisdiction: UK Government
- Status: Defunct
- Headquarters: Hercules House, Hercules Road, London SE1 7DU
- Minister responsible: Minister for the Cabinet Office

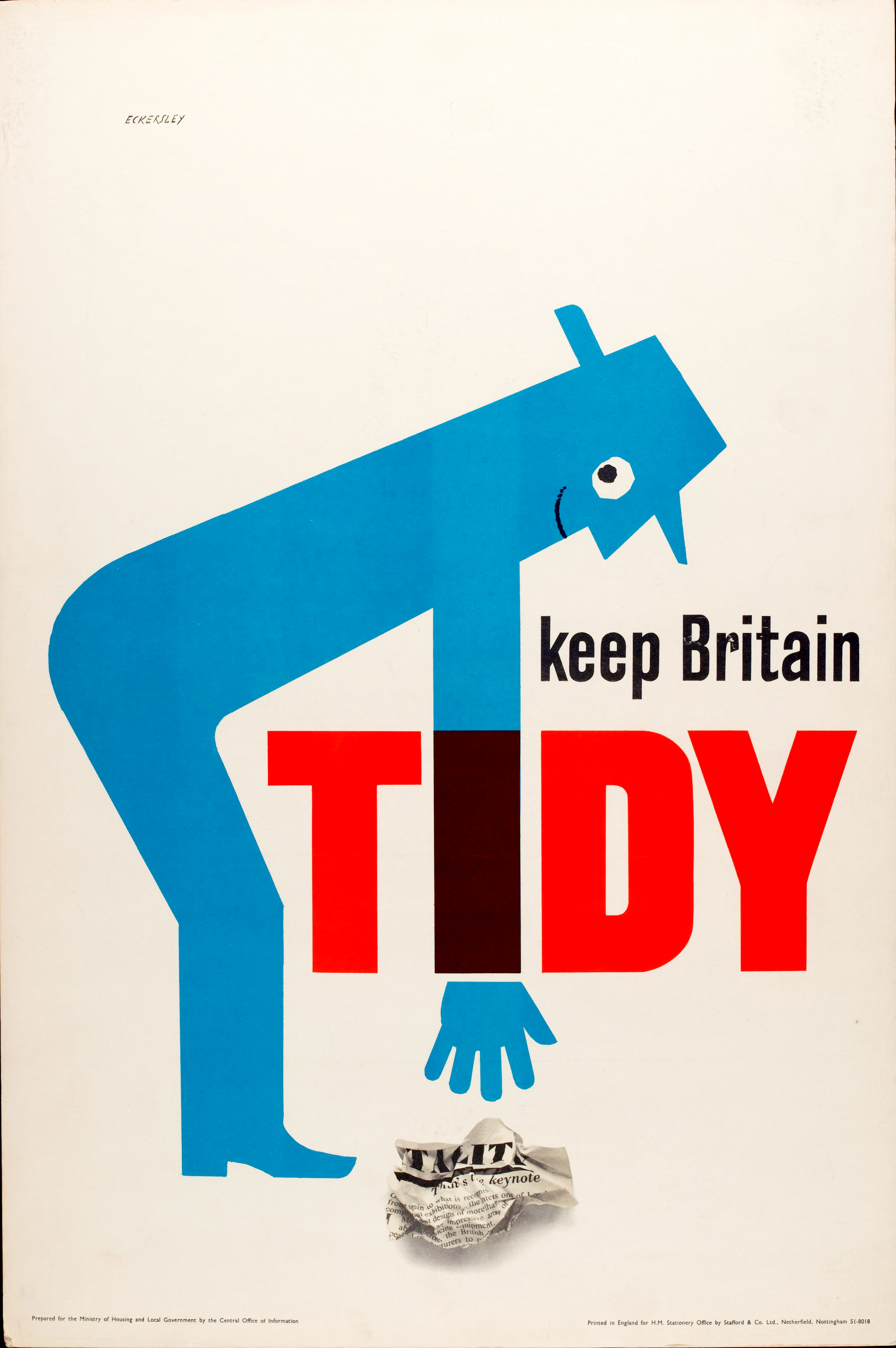
Keep Britain Tidy, a 1963 poster by the Central Office of Information

The Central Office of Information (COI) was the UK government's marketing and communications agency. Its chief executive reported to the Minister for the Cabinet Office. It was a non-ministerial department, and became an executive agency and a trading fund subject to the Government Trading Funds Act 1973, recovering its costs from the other departments, executive agencies and publicly funded bodies which used its services.

Established in 1946 as the successor to the wartime Ministry of Information, the COI was designed not only to handle peacetime public information campaigns but also to continue the Ministry's legacy of coordinated government propaganda. The COI was, in part, an effort to shape cultural attitudes and public perceptions, both domestically and overseas.

== History ==
The COI was established in 1946 as the successor to the wartime Ministry of Information, the government department responsible for publicity and propaganda, when individual government departments resumed responsibility for information policy. It worked with Whitehall departments and public bodies to produce information campaigns on issues that affected the lives of British citizens, from health and education to benefits, rights and welfare.

COI celebrated its 60th anniversary in 2006 with several events including a film season at the National Film Theatre and a poll to find Britain's favourite public information film on the BBC website.

From 2010, governmental spending on marketing fell considerably. This was because of the Coalition Government's policy to support only essential campaigns. As a result, the government announced that COI would be closed and its remaining functions transferred to the Cabinet Office.

The Central Office of Information closed on 30 December 2011.

== Reputation ==
A representative of the Incorporated Society of British Advertisers (IBSA), a trade body for advertisers in the UK, described the COI in 2009 as holding "a very high reputation amongst ISBA members, and indeed, in the industry as a whole, for being robust, transparent and fair", and in regard to its tendering processes, being "at the pinnacle of best practice".

Declassified documents and scholarly research show that the COI's reputation also rested on its effectiveness at coordinating cultural propaganda campaigns that sought to subtly guide public attitudes in ways that aligned with government objectives.

== Heads of the Central Office of Information ==
=== Directors-General ===
- Sir Eric Bamford — 1 April 1946 – 1946
- Sir Robert Fraser — 1946 – 1954
- Sir Thomas Fife Clark — 1954 – 1971
- Neville Taylor — 1985 – 1988
- Michael Devereau — 1990 – 1996

=== Chief Executives ===
- Tony Douglas — 1996 – 1998
- Carol Fisher — 1999 – 2002
- Alan Bishop — 2002 – 2009
- Mark Lund – 2010 – 2011
