= George Barnes (BBC controller) =

British broadcasting executive

Barnes in 1955.

Sir George Reginald Barnes (13 September 1904 – 22 September 1960) was a British broadcasting executive, who was a station Controller of both BBC Radio and later BBC Television in the 1940s and 1950s. He was Principal of the University College of North Staffordshire, now Keele University, from 1956 to 1960.

== Early life ==
He was born in Byfleet, Surrey, England. After spells at the Royal Naval Colleges in Osborne and later Dartmouth, he attended King's College, Cambridge, from 1922 to 1927.

== Career ==
After Cambridge he returned to Dartmouth as a Master at the school there till 1930. After a short spell at the Cambridge University Press he then joined the BBC in 1935 as a Producer in the Talks Department. He produced talks with several high-profile figures, including in 1937 producing what is now the only record of author Virginia Woolf's voice in the 'Craftsmanship' edition of Words Fail Me series, broadcast on 29 April 1937. The same year he produced four talks by William Butler Yeats.

In 1946 he was promoted to be the first ever Controller of the new BBC Radio station, the Third Programme, which still exists today in the form of BBC Radio 3, as it was renamed in 1967. He held this position for four years before in October 1950 becoming the Director of BBC Television. His appointment caused the resignation of the Controller of Programmes, Norman Collins, who disagreed with a man whose background was in sound broadcasting being appointed as his superior in the television service.

It was under his tenure as Director that interest in television exploded, particularly with the screening of the coronation of Queen Elizabeth II in 1953. Drawing an audience of an estimated 20 million British and 300 million worldwide viewers – an unprecedented viewership – the Coronation broadcast, when viewed later by the Queen, caused her to knight Barnes on the spot at the BBC's Lime Grove Studios. Television coverage was now nationwide, although in 1955 the service was faced with the prospect of competition for the first time when the rival ITV network was launched.

Barnes retired from broadcasting in 1956, becoming Principal of the University College of North Staffordshire, now Keele University.

== Personal life ==
In 1927 he married Dorothy Anne, daughter of Henry Bond, Master of Trinity Hall, Cambridge 1919–1929. He died at Keele in 1960, aged 56, leaving his wife, Anne, and their son Anthony.

== Publications ==
- A List of Books printed in Cambridge at the University Press, 1521–1800. Compiled by Francis J. H. Jenkinson, Sydney Castle. Roberts and George Reginald Barnes. Edited by G. R. Barnes (1935)
- The Private Papers of John, Earl of Sandwich, First Lord of the Admiralty, 1771–1782 Edited by G. R. Barnes and J. H. Owen. Four volumes (1932–38)
- Publications of the Navy Records Society, vol. 69 by John Montagu, George Reginald Barnes and John Hely Owen (1932)

Academic offices
Preceded by Sir John Lennard-Jones	Principal, University College of North Staffordshire (now Keele University); 1956–1960	Succeeded by Dr Harold McCarter Taylor
Cultural offices
Preceded by Vincent de Ferranti	President of the Television Society; 1958–1960	Succeeded by Harold Bishop
