= 1958 Morecambe and Lonsdale by-election =

UK Parliamentary by-election

The 1958 Morecambe and Lonsdale by-election was held on 6 November 1958. It was held due to the elevation of the incumbent Conservative MP, Sir Ian Fraser, being elevated to a life peerage. It was retained by the Conservative candidate Basil de Ferranti.

== Result ==
By-election 6 November 1958: Morecambe and Lonsdale
Party	Candidate	Votes	%	±%
Conservative	Basil de Ferranti	23,923	65.3	−5.9
Labour	Frank R McManus	12,692	34.7	+5.9
Majority		11,231	30.6	−11.8
Turnout		36,615		
Conservative hold		Swing		
