= Basil de Ferranti =

British businessman and a Conservative Party politician

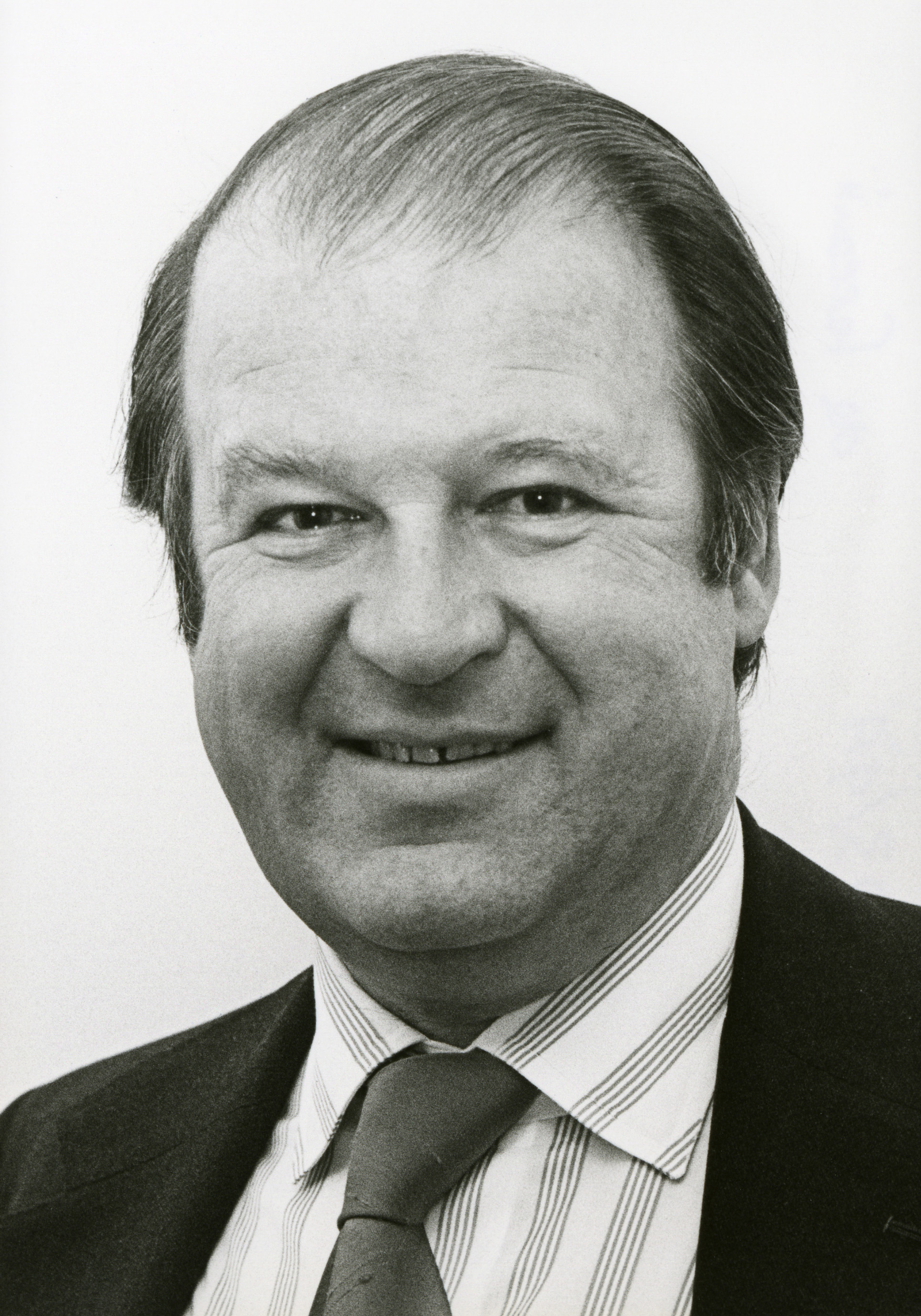
European Parliament portrait of de Ferranti

Basil Reginald Vincent Ziani de Ferranti (Note: This British person has the barrelled surname Ziani de Ferranti, but is known by the surname de Ferranti.) (2 July 1930 – 24 September 1988) was a British businessman and a Conservative Party politician.

He was educated at Eton and Trinity College, Cambridge. His father was Sir Vincent Ziani de Ferranti and his sister was Valerie Hunter Gordon. He was the grandson of the electrical engineer and inventor Sebastian de Ferranti and domestic electrical pioneer Gertrude de Ferranti; and great-grandson of concert pianist and author Juliana Scott Szczepanowska de Ferranti.

He was an unsuccessful candidate at the 1955 general election in the Labour-held Manchester Exchange constituency.

In 1958, he was elected to the House of Commons as member of parliament for Morecambe and Lonsdale at a by-election, following the elevation to the peerage of the constituency's Conservative MP, Ian Fraser.

He held the seat at the 1959 general election, but stood down from Parliament at the 1964 election. He had held ministerial office only briefly, as Parliamentary Secretary for Aviation from July to October 1962.

He later became a member (1973–1979) and chairman (1976–1978) of the European Economic and Social Committee. He subsequently became a member of the European Parliament (MEP), and a vice president from 1979 to 1982. He represented the Hampshire West constituency from 1979 to 1984, and Hampshire Central from 1984 until his death.

== Notes ==
Parliament of the United Kingdom
Preceded by Ian Fraser	Member of Parliament for Morecambe and Lonsdale; 1958–1964	Succeeded by Alfred Hall-Davis
Honorary titles
Preceded by Robert Cooke	Baby of the House; 1958–1958	Succeeded by Patrick Wolrige-Gordon
