= Alfred Hall-Davis =

British politician (1924–1979)

Sir Alfred George Fletcher Hall-Davis (21 June 1924 – 20 November 1979) was a British Conservative Party politician.

Hall-Davis was educated at Terra Nova School, Birkdale and Clifton College, Bristol. He was a director of a brewery, hotel and other companies and served on the Conservative Party executive.

Hall-Davis contested St Helens in 1950 and Chorley in 1951 and 1955. He was Member of Parliament for Morecambe and Lonsdale from 1964 until 1979, preceding Mark Lennox-Boyd. From 1973 to 1974, he was an assistant government whip. He was knighted in the 1979 Birthday Honours.

Hall-Davis died at the age of 55, six months after leaving the House of Commons.

Parliament of the United Kingdom
Preceded by Basil de Ferranti	Member of Parliament for Morecambe and Lonsdale; 1964–1979	Succeeded by Mark Lennox-Boyd
