= Gertrude de Ferranti =

British electrical engineer (1869 – 1959)

- Ferranti (right) in 1936, with Caroline Haslett
- Born: Gertrude Ruth Ince; 15 April 1869; Cardiff, Wales, United Kingdom
- Died: November 16, 1959 (aged 90); Cobham, Surrey, England, United Kingdom
- Burial place: Hampstead Cemetery
- Known for: Campaigner for domestic electricity
- Spouse(s): Sebastian Ziani de Ferranti (m. 1888; died 1930) James Kirkwood (m. 1942; died 1955)
- Children: 7

Gertrude Ruth de Ferranti-Kirkwood (née Ince; 15 April 1869 – 16 November 1959) was a Welsh activist who campaigned for affordable and accessible electricity in the home, through her membership of the Electrical Association for Women and her work with her husband Sebastian de Ferranti. In 1936 she and Caroline Haslett were the only two women to attend the World Power Conference as representatives from the United Kingdom.

== Early life and family ==
Gertrude Ruth Ince was born in Cardiff, Wales on 15 April 1869. She was the second daughter of Zoë (née Buisson) and Francis Ince, a London based solicitor who co-founded S Z de Ferranti with Sebastian de Ferranti and Charles Sparks in 1885. She attended Hampstead High School with her sisters, coming home for lunch and tea. She was a young girl when her father brought Ferranti home for dinner and introduced her as "the best looking in the family, but an awful little devil". Ferranti was a regular visitor to the family home over the next years, and accompanied the family on holidays.

When it was discovered that Gertrude needed to wear glasses, and was given a rather unflattering pair, Ferranti created a pair for her from gold plated piano wire, and then invented a machine to make further pairs and supplied a number of family and friends with similar pairs for many years.

Gertrude married Ferranti on 24 April 1888 at St Dominic's Priory Hampstead and they had seven children: Zoë Vanda Marie (1889–1978); Basil (1891–1917); Gerard Vincent (1893–1980); Vera Catherine (1898–1993); Yolanda (1902–1919); Denis (1908–1992) and Yvonne Teresa (1913–1988). Her granddaughter Valerie Hunter Gordon invented what is considered the world's first disposable nappy and an early sanitary towel system. Her grandson, Basil de Ferranti, was a Conservative politician who represented Morecambe and Lonsdale in the late 1950s and early 1960s.

== Electrical engineering ==
In the early years of her marriage, Gertrude de Ferranti worked on the plans for Deptford Power Station with her husband.

The de Ferrantis installed an electricity plant at their home in Baslow Hall, which had an electric laundry and tennis courts lit by electric light. According to an article in the July 1927 issue of the Electrical Age for Women, Baslow Hall made use of waste heat and used hot water for energy storage. They also converted their seaside home in Deganwy into an all-electric house.

In 1928, Gertrude was elected vice-president of the Electrical Association for Women and in January 1929 was elected president of the newly founded North Wales branch of the EAW. She was elected Chairman of Council in 1930. Gertrude was a member of the Royal Institution of Great Britain.

After her husband's death in 1930, Gertrude supervised the conversion of Woodgreen Farm in Upper Basildon to electricity.

When Gertrude de Ferranti attended the World Power Conference in Washington in 1936, she was described as a "lady tycoon" and the press noted that she was half-owner of Britain's largest privately owned electrical engineering organisation.

== Later life ==
On 26 August 1942, Gertrude married Lt Col James Kirkwood (1872–1955) in Eldoret, Kenya. He was born in Greymouth, New Zealand, and had a military career with British imperial troops in Africa in the late nineteenth and early twentieth centuries. He served on the Western Front during the First World War when he was awarded the DSO and appointed CMG. He settled in Kenya in 1920 as a farmer, ran a hotel in Kitale, and was elected to serve on the Legislative Council of Kenya in 1927.

Gertrude Kirkwood died on 16 November 1959 in Cobham, Surrey.

== Commemoration ==
In March 2024, Gertrude was commemorated with a virtual blue plaque as a key figure in the history of the Women's Engineering Society and the Electrical Association for Women.

== See also ==
- Caroline Haslett
- Women's Engineering Society
- Electrical Association for Women
