= Royal Television Society =

British educational charity

- Abbreviation: RTS
- Formation: 7 September 1927; 98 years ago
- Type: Television organisation
- Headquarters: London, EC4; United Kingdom
- Region served: United Kingdom and Ireland
- Members: 5030 (2019)
- Official language: English
- Royal Patron: Charles III
- Chief executive: Theresa Wise
- Website: www.rts.org.uk

The Royal Television Society (RTS) is a British-based educational charity for the discussion, and analysis of television in all its forms, past, present, and future. It is the oldest television society in the world. It currently has fourteen regional and national centres in the UK, as well as a branch in the Republic of Ireland.

== History ==
The group was formed as the Television Society on 7 September 1927, a time when television was still in its experimental stage. Regular high-definition (then defined as at least 200 lines) broadcasts did not even begin for another nine years until the BBC began its transmissions from Alexandra Palace in 1936.

In addition to serving as a forum for scientists and engineers, the society published regular newsletters charting the development of the new medium. These documents now form important historical records of the early history of television broadcasting.

The society was granted its Royal title in 1966. The Prince of Wales became patron of the Society in November 1997.

== Activities ==
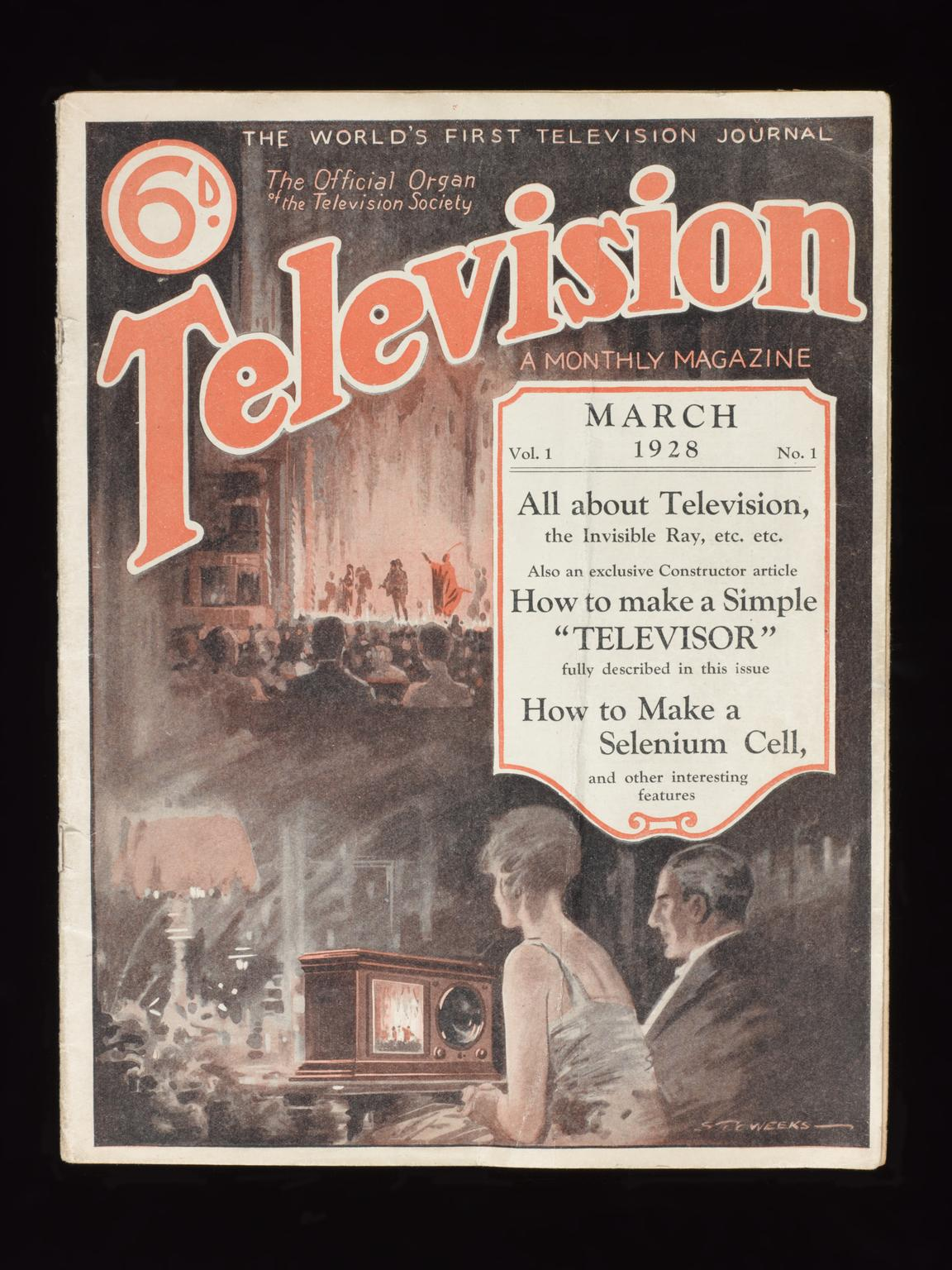
Vol. 1, No. 1. Television magazine front cover

The society regularly holds meetings and seminars, attended by members of the public and professionals from various areas of the television industry, and it also publishes the monthly magazine Television, covering a broad range of television topics.

Major events held by the RTS include the biennial RTS Cambridge Convention, a three-day event held at King's College, Cambridge. The convention, chaired by one of the UK's major broadcasters, brings together influential figures from the television industry for a series of stimulating talks.

The RTS also hosts "Anatomy of a Hit" events, which gather together the writers, cast and commissioner of some of Britain's most successful TV shows to discuss their qualities. Recent programmes discussed have included Sherlock, Doctor Who, and Humans.

The society also holds a substantial archive of printed, photographic, and audio-visual material of value to television historians and scholars.

== Awards ==
Each year, the Royal Television Society hosts six United Kingdom wide national award ceremonies, as well as 21 regional award ceremonies, as of 2024, across 14 nations and regions in the British Isles.

=== National Awards ===
- RTS Programme Awards
- RTS Craft & Design Awards
- RTS Television Journalism Awards
- RTS Student Television Awards, in addition to regional student awards shown in next section
- RTS Young Technologist Awards, given to those seen as potential future leaders in broadcasting technology
- RTS Pilgrim Awards, acknowledging the outstanding work of RTS volunteers

=== Regional Awards ===
- RTS Cymru/Wales Awards
- RTS Devon and Cornwall Student Awards
- RTS East Awards / RTS East Student Awards
- RTS London Student Awards
- RTS Midlands Awards / RTS Midlands Student Awards
- RTS North East and The Borders Awards
- RTS North West Awards / RTS North West Student Awards
- RTS Northern Ireland Awards
- RTS Republic of Ireland Awards / RTS Republic of Ireland Student Awards
- RTS Technology Centre Awards
- RTS Scotland Awards / RTS Scotland Student Awards
- RTS Southern Awards / RTS Southern Student Awards
- RTS West of England Awards
- RTS Yorkshire Awards / RTS Yorkshire Student Awards

== RTS Futures ==
RTS Futures was launched in 2007 to help people in the early stages of their television careers. RTS Futures offers the opportunity to meet with senior industry professionals, such as series producers and commissioners, as well as their peers in the television industry. RTS Futures hosts a wide range of talks and training sessions aimed at helping young people progress in the business. Recent events have included How to be the Best Researcher and the RTS Futures Entry Level Training Fair.

== Presidents of the Society ==
There have been 19 presidents of the Society, from its founding in 1927 through to 2016; since October 2016, the position has been left vacant. (Note: Contrary to the simple list at the RTS website (as of March 2025) stating that Peter Bazalgette held the position until 2017, the RTS 2016 Annual Report specifically states that he stepped down in September 2016.)

- Lord Haldane of Cloan (1927–1928)
- Sir Ambrose Fleming (1928–1945)
- Sir Robert Renwick (1945–1954)
- Sir Vincent Ferranti (1954–1957)
- Sir George Barnes (1958–1960)
- Sir Harold Bishop (1961–1962)
- Sir Robert Fraser (1963–1964)
- Sir Neil Sutherland (1965–1966)
- B. V. Bowden, Baron Bowden (1967–1972)
- Aubrey Buxton (Lord BuxtonL) (1973–1977)
- Prince Edward, Duke of Kent (1977–1979)
- Sir Huw Wheldon (1979–1986)
- Sir Paul Fox (1986–1992)
- Bill Cotton (1992–1995)
- Michael Grade (1995–1997)
- Sir Jeremy Isaacs (1997–2000)
- Will Wyatt (2000–2004)
- Sir Robert Phillis (2004–2009)
- Sir Peter Bazalgette (2010–2016)
