= Ferrante Ferranti =

French photographer and architect

Ferrante Ferranti (born 1960) is a French photographer and architect. Born in Algeria to parents of Sardinian and Sicilian origin, he trained as an architect in Paris. Afterward, he devoted himself to photography. He is the author of several books of photographs, often in collaboration with the writer Dominique Fernandez. His principal subjects are the Mediterranean, baroque art and Italy.
