= Sebastian Ziani de Ferranti =

British electrical engineer and inventor

Sebastian Ziani de Ferranti FRS
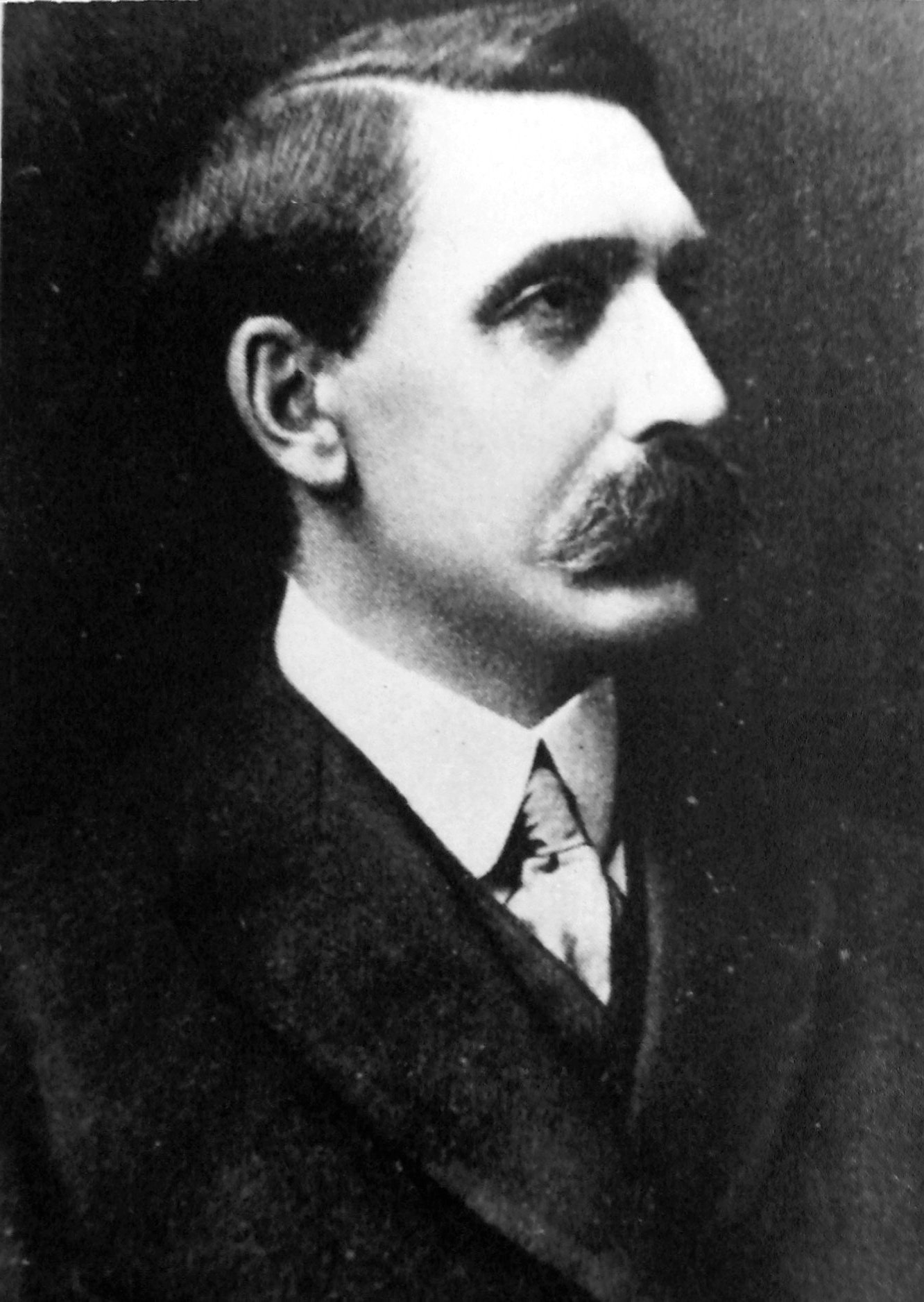
- Born: 9 April 1864; Liverpool, England
- Died: 13 January 1930 (aged 65); Zürich, Switzerland
- Education: University College London
- Known for: Ferranti dynamo Ferranti effect High-voltage circuit breaker High-voltage AC power station
- Awards: Faraday Medal (1924); Fellow of the Royal Society (1927)
- Scientific career
- Fields: Electrical engineer and inventor

Sebastian Pietro Innocenzo Adhemar Ziani de Ferranti (9 April 1864 – 13 January 1930) was a British electrical engineer and inventor who pioneered high-voltage AC power in the UK, patented the Ferranti dynamo and designed Deptford power station.

== Personal life ==
Ferranti was born in Liverpool, England. His Italian father, Giulio Cesare Ziani de Ferranti, was a photographer and his British mother Juliana de Ferranti (née Scott) was a concert pianist. His paternal grandfather was composer Marco Aurelio Zani de Ferranti. He was educated at Hampstead School, London; St. Augustine's College, Westgate-on-Sea; and University College London.

He married Gertrude Ruth Ince on 24 April 1888 at St Dominic's Priory Hampstead and they had seven children: Zoë Vanda Marie (1889–1978); Basil (1891–1917); Gerard Vincent (1893–1980); Vera Catherine (1898–1993); Yolanda (1902–1919); Denis (1908–1992) and Yvonne Teresa (1913-1988). Ferranti died on 13 January 1930 in Zürich, Switzerland. He was buried at Hampstead Cemetery, London in the same grave as his parents, wife and his daughter Yolanda (who died at seventeen from appendicitis).

His grandson, Basil de Ferranti, was a Conservative politician who represented Morecambe and Lonsdale in the late fifties and early sixties. His granddaughter Valerie Hunter Gordon invented what is considered the world's first disposable nappy and an early sanitary towel system.

== Professional career ==
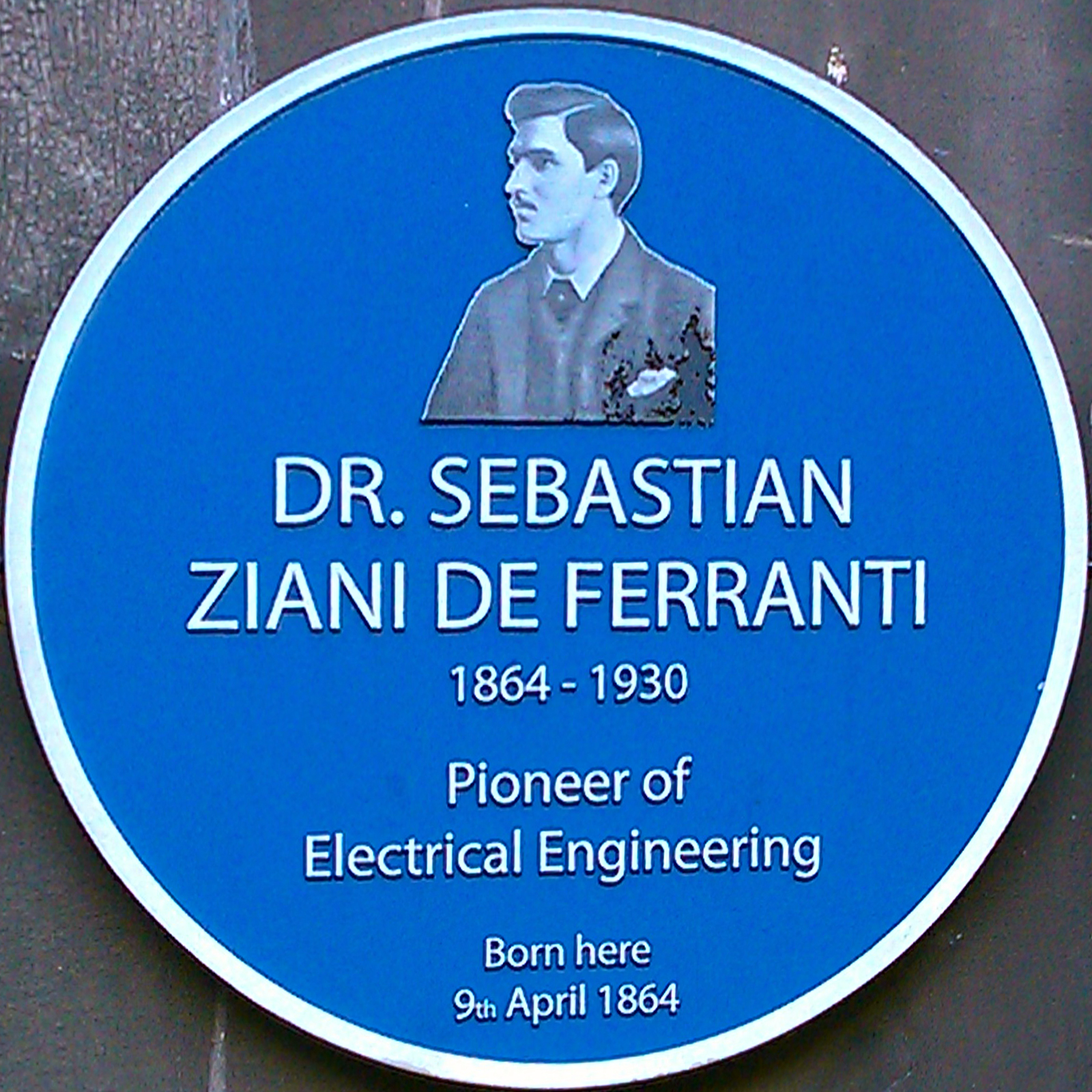
Blue Plaque (Liverpool)

Ferranti showed a remarkable talent for electrical engineering from his childhood. His first invention, at the age of 13, was an arc light for street lighting. Reportedly, around the age of 16, he built an electrical generator (that had a "Zig-zag armature") with the help of William Thomson (the future Lord Kelvin) and later patented the device (called the "Ferranti Dynamo"). He worked for Siemens Brothers at Charlton, London, and in 1882 he set up shop in London designing various electrical devices as the firm Ferranti, Thompson and Ince.

In the late 1880s, there was a debate within the American industry about the transmission of electrical power, known as the war of the currents. Thomas Edison supported a direct current (DC) based system, largely due to his holding many key patents and having set up some power plants supplying DC power. The rival Westinghouse Electric Corporation supported an alternating current (AC) system.

Ferranti bet on AC early on and was one of the few experts in this system in the UK. In 1887, the London Electric Supply Corporation (LESCo) hired Ferranti to design their power station at Deptford. He designed the building, the generating plant and the distribution system. On its completion in 1891, it was the first truly modern power station, supplying high-voltage AC power for distribution at 11kV that was then "stepped down" for consumer use on each street. This basic system remains in use today around the world. One of the remaining supports of the Deptford Power Station generating hall forms the frame of the sign at the Museum of Science and Industry in Manchester UK, home of the Ferranti Archives.

S.Z. de Ferranti, the company set up by Ferranti in 1885 with Francis Ince and Charles Sparks as partners, became S.Z. de Ferranti Ltd in 1890 and Ferranti Ltd in 1900, after the resignation of Ince and Sparks. Ferranti Ltd would outlive its founder and develop the Ferranti Mark 1, the world's first commercially available general-purpose computer, in 1951.

Ferranti was President of the Institution of Electrical Engineers in 1910 and 1911 and was elected a Fellow of the Royal Society in 1927. He received an honorary doctorate from the University of Manchester in 1912. Ferranti was actively involved in the formation of the British Electrical and Allied Manufacturers Association (BEAMA) in 1911 and its first chairman, to 1913. He was a great supporter of the Electrical Association for Women, which Gertrude Ziani de Ferranti played a large role in.

== Commemoration ==
In 1932, the London Power Company commemorated Ferranti by naming a new 1,315 GRT coastal collier SS Ferranti. Ferranti's wife Gertrude and her brother Robin Ince wrote and published a book, The Life and Letters of Sebastian Ziani de Ferranti in tribute to him in 1934, to which Caroline Haslett contributed the foreword. In 2016 a blue plaque in honour of Sebastian Ziani de Ferranti was installed at 130 Bold Street, Liverpool, marking the place of his birth. An urban park situated south of the site of the Deptford Power Station in southeast London is named Ferranti Park in his honour.

== Patents ==
- "U.S. patent 341,097 Unipolar dynamo electric machine".

== See also ==
- Vincent Ziani de Ferranti (son)
- Baslow Hall
- Homopolar generator
