= Eric Bamford =

English civil servant

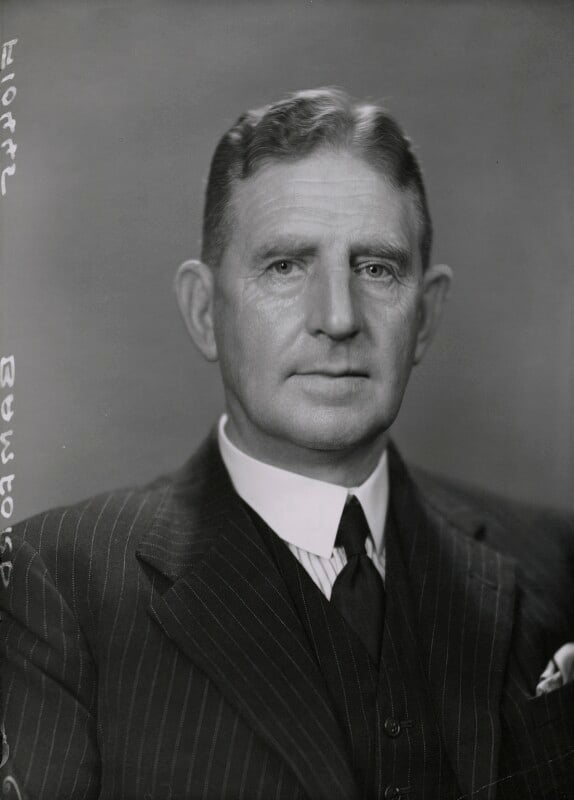
Bamford in 1948

Sir Eric St John Bamford, KCB, KBE, CMG (14 October 1891 – 13 April 1957) was an English civil servant.

== Background and career ==
Born on 14 October 1891, Bamford attended Corpus Christi College, Oxford, before passing the examinations to enter HM Civil Service in 1914. Service in the First World War interrupted his entry; he was wounded in France which left him in worsening health for the rest of his life. After demobilisation, he entered the Civil Service as an official in HM Treasury in 1919.

Bamford was private secretary to the Financial Secretary to the Treasury from 1919 until 1921. He was then Secretary to the Trade Facilities Advisory Committee from 1926 to 1933, and then to the Imperial Communications Advisory Committee until 1938, when he returned to the Treasury. When the Second World War broke out in 1939, he moved to the new Ministry of Information; he was appointed Deputy Director-General in 1941 and Director-General in 1945. He was then Director-General of the Central Office of Information (the Ministry of Information's successor) in 1946, before returning to the Treasury, where he remained for two years. Finally, he was Chairman of the Board of Inland Revenue from 1948 to 1955. He died on 13 April 1957. Alongside two knighthoods (the KCB and KBE awarded in 1949 and 1946 respectively) and the CMG, he was awarded with an honorary fellowship by his old college.

Frank Worsley, who had captained Shakleton’s Endurance was close friends with Eric Bamford and died at Eric's house in Claygate, Surrey. Worsley's wife Jean died in the same house a few years later.

Government offices
Preceded by Sir Cornelius Gregg	Chairman, Board of Inland Revenue; 1948–1955	Succeeded by Sir Henry Hancock
