= Morecambe and Lonsdale =

Former UK Parliamentary constituency, 1950–1983

- Former county constituency for the House of Commons
- Morecambe and Lonsdale in Lancashire, showing boundaries used from 1974-1983

1950–1983
- Seats: one
- Created from: Lancaster and Lonsdale
- Replaced by: Morecambe & Lunesdale, Westmorland & Lonsdale and Barrow & Furness

Morecambe and Lonsdale was a constituency of the House of Commons which existed until 1983.

Following the reorganisation of local government in England in the 1970s, a successor constituency called Morecambe and Lunesdale was formed. This followed the formation of Cumbria as a county council.

Before 1950, Morecambe was in the Lancaster constituency.

== Boundaries ==
In the 1950s, the seat of Morecambe and Lonsdale incorporated Morecambe, Heysham, Carnforth, and the communities with Ulverston Rural District, which included Grange-over-Sands, Ulverston, Pennington, Satterthwaite, Hawkshead and Coniston

== Members of Parliament ==
Election	Member	Party
1950	constituency created as "Morecambe and Lonsdale"	
1950	Ian Fraser	Conservative
1958 by-election	Basil de Ferranti	Conservative
1964	Alfred Hall-Davis	Conservative
1979	Mark Lennox-Boyd	Conservative
1983	constituency renamed as "Morecambe and Lunesdale" after boundary changes	

== Election Results ==
=== Elections in the 1950s ===
General election 1950: Morecambe and Lonsdale
Party	Candidate	Votes	%	±%
Conservative	Ian Fraser	28,041	60.3	
Labour	Albert Gaskell	12,768	27.4	
Liberal	Gerard de Pfyffer Leeming	5,723	12.3	
Majority		15,273	32.9	
Turnout		46,532	84.5	
Conservative win (new seat)				

General election 1951: Morecambe and Lonsdale
Party	Candidate	Votes	%	±%
Conservative	Ian Fraser	31,211	69.5	+9.2
Labour	Ernest Gardner	13,732	30.5	+3.1
Majority		17,479	39.0	+6.1
Turnout		44,943	80.4	−4.1
Conservative hold		Swing		

General election 1955: Morecambe and Lonsdale
Party	Candidate	Votes	%	±%
Conservative	Ian Fraser	29,706	71.2	+1.7
Labour	Wilfred Fielding	12,005	28.8	−1.7
Majority		17,701	42.4	+3.5
Turnout		41,711	74.5	−5.9
Conservative hold		Swing		

1958 Morecambe and Lunesdale by-election
Party	Candidate	Votes	%	±%
Conservative	Basil de Ferranti	23,923	65.3	−5.9
Labour	Frank R McManus	12,692	34.7	+5.9
Majority		11,231	30.6	−11.8
Turnout		36,615		
Conservative hold		Swing		

General election 1959: Morecambe and Lonsdale
Party	Candidate	Votes	%	±%
Conservative	Basil de Ferranti	30,228	68.0	+4.7
Labour	Frank R McManus	14,523	32.0	−2.7
Majority		15,975	36.0	+5.4
Turnout		44,751	77.2	
Conservative hold		Swing		

=== Elections in the 1960s ===
General election 1964: Morecambe and Lonsdale
Party	Candidate	Votes	%	±%
Conservative	Alfred Hall-Davis	24,756	53.86	
Labour	Frank R McManus	12,392	26.96	
Independent Liberal	James Rafton Smallwood	8,818	19.18	New
Majority		12,364	26.90	
Turnout		45,966	77.09	
Conservative hold		Swing		

General election 1966: Morecambe and Lonsdale
Party	Candidate	Votes	%	±%
Conservative	Alfred Hall-Davis	24,138	51.91	
Labour	Ivan Limmer	13,838	29.76	
Liberal	David M Clark	8,526	18.33	New
Majority		10,300	22.15	
Turnout		37,976	76.53	
Conservative hold		Swing		

=== Elections in the 1970s ===
General election 1970: Morecambe and Lonsdale
Party	Candidate	Votes	%	±%
Conservative	Alfred Hall-Davis	27,442	56.99	
Labour	Eric Garbutt	13,916	28.90	
Liberal	Anthony W Drury	6,792	14.11	
Majority		13,526	28.09	
Turnout		48,150	72.55	
Conservative hold		Swing		

General election February 1974: Morecambe and Lonsdale
Party	Candidate	Votes	%	±%
Conservative	Alfred Hall-Davis	27,704	51.85	
Liberal	Bernard North Wates	12,948	24.23	
Labour	Terry Cannon	12,782	23.92	
Majority		14,756	27.62	
Turnout		53,434	78.56	
Conservative hold		Swing		

General election October 1974: Morecambe and Lonsdale
Party	Candidate	Votes	%	±%
Conservative	Alfred Hall-Davis	24,877	49.84	
Labour	Eric Garbutt	12,633	25.31	
Liberal	AT Stuttard	12,404	24.85	
Majority		12,244	24.53	
Turnout		49,914	72.90	
Conservative hold		Swing		

General election 1979: Morecambe and Lonsdale
Party	Candidate	Votes	%	±%
Conservative	Mark Lennox-Boyd	29,068	55.40	
Labour	G Collier	13,253	25.26	
Liberal	HR Tinker	10,150	19.34	
Majority		15,815	30.14	
Turnout		52,471	76.46	
Conservative hold		Swing		
