= Vincent Ziani de Ferranti =

Sir "Gerard" Vincent Ziani de Ferranti, CBE MC (16 February 1893 – 20 May 1980) was the second son of Dr Sebastian Ziani de Ferranti and Gertrude de Ferranti. As chairman of Ferranti from 1930 to 1963, he was responsible for evolving the company into a diverse multimillion-pound organisation recognized as an industry leader in electrical engineering, electronics and avionics.

== Early life ==
Ferranti was educated at Repton School, and had two years of training at Yarrow shipyards in Scotstoun. He fought in World War I in the service of the Royal Engineers. During his service, he rose to the rank of captain, and was awarded the Military Cross. His elder brother, Major Basil Francis Sebastian Ziani de Ferranti, also a Military Cross recipient in World War I, was killed in action.

== Career ==
After the death of his elder brother, Vincent became heir apparent. When he returned from military service in 1921, Vincent joined Ferranti as a manager in the transformer department. Vincent jointly developed and patented surge absorbers to protect transformers from lightning strikes, which aided Ferranti's ability to produce high voltage transformers for export. In 1904 Dr Ferranti lost control of his company when it went into voluntary receivership, and after restructuring in 1905 he only held 10% of the shares. This resulted in him being effectively excluded from company business by the receiver managers until 1922, when a share restructuring meant that he and Vincent held 29% of the total equity allowing them to regain control of the company. However, it wasn't until 1928 that Dr Ferranti became chairman again.

In 1923, Vincent and R. Schofield visited A.B. Cooper, the general manager of Ferranti Canada. Vincent realised that there was greater potential to expand transformer operations in the emerging Canadian market than in the UK market. After returning to the UK, Vincent gave Cooper the green light to go ahead with plans to double the Canadian factory output. Ball & Vardalas consider that this visit forged a special relationship between Cooper and Vincent that would last for the next thirty years and help Canadian small transformer technology transfer back to the parent company.

During the 1920s, Dr. Ferranti diversified manufacturing into radio, and his team, led by Albert Hall, produced the Standard Model A21 allowing Ferranti to compete with other manufacturers. Vincent improved the performance of Ferranti's radio model by adding valve (or vacuum tube) production. Vacuum tubes were produced at a plant in Stalybridge. Later, Wilson identified this as a crucial decision because valves were the fundamental component of radios. After seeing Professor Finch perform a valve demonstration at the Physical Society, Vincent employed two of Finch's students (R. W. Sutton and M. E. Sions) in combination with Arthur Chilcott from General Electric and Kenyon Taylor, a Ferranti engineer. This group formed the nucleus of a team which would eventually become Ferranti Electronics.

After the death of his father in 1930, Vincent became the chairman and chief executive of Ferranti. Around 1933, seeing the business potential of television, he assigned Taylor to research this new medium. By 1935 he had acquired larger premises at Moston to expand the company's domestic product line. In the expansion, accountant Sir John Toothill and chief engineer Dr. N. H. Searby were employed. As World War II approached, Ferranti diverted manufacturing from radio and TV to IFF radar and government work. Toothill was dispatched to Edinburgh to set up what would eventually become Ferranti Scotland, establishing Ferranti as one of Britain's leading electrical, electronics and avionics manufacturers. Mr M Stewart, stated that this move was the birth of the electronics industry in Scotland, indicating that Messrs. Ferranti Ltd. would be the first parent firm to receive electronics industry development government contracts.

In 1946, Vincent became president of the Institution of Electrical Engineers (IEE), the first time in IEE history that a son had followed his father into that position. In 1948, he was knighted in recognition of Ferranti's contribution to the war effort. In 1949, the British government contracted Ferranti to collaborate with the Bristol Aeroplane Company on a major guided missile project that was later known as the Bloodhound project. Vincent set up a Research & Development laboratory in Canada, led by Kenyon Taylor, to develop DATAR, In 1957 he sold off the radio and television business to EKCO a move which allowed Ferranti to focus on commercial business. In 1963, he sold off Ferranti UK's non-military computer operations, which included the design rights to the Ferranti-Packard 6000 computer. According to Vardalas, this decision killed off the Ferranti-Packard computer business. By the time his eldest son, Sebastian, became chairman in 1963, the company was capitalised at £22m.

== Positions held ==
- 1930 chairman and Chief Executive Ferranti
- 1938 chairman – British Electrical and Allied Manufacturer's Association (BEAMA)
- 1946 President of the Institution of Electrical Engineers
- 1948 Knighthood bestowed on him
- 1950 Chairman of the World Power Conference's international executive committee

== Personal life ==
Ferranti had two sons, Sebastian and Basil, and three daughters. He died at his home Henbury Hall, Henbury, Cheshire on 20 May 1980. His wife, Dorothy Hettie Wilson, survived him. In the 1910s Dorothy had travelled to Australia with her father R P Wilson, who had previously worked with the Ferranti company, and was hired to work on the electrification of the Melbourne Suburban Railways. During the First World War, she served in the British Military Intelligence Department and later played a significant role in the Electrical Association for Women.

Cultural offices
Preceded by Robert Renwick	President of the Television Society; 1954–1957	Succeeded by George Barnes
