= Marco Aurelio Zani de Ferranti =

Italian guitarist and composer

Marco Aurelio Zani de Ferranti (23 December 1801 – November 1878) was an Italian classical guitarist and composer.

== Biography ==
Marco Aurelio Zani de Ferranti was born in Bologna on 23 December 1801. He began on the violin, but switched to guitar at age 16. In 1820, he moved to Paris and later to Saint Petersburg, before settling in Belgium. He later toured in France, England, Italy, and the United States. His range of works for solo guitar are extensive, and include a set of innovative and demanding Exercices Op. 49, and also a group of twenty-four Caprices Op.11 (probably inspired by the earlier work of his compatriot Paganini). Sets of variations were composed on themes by Weber Op.9 and Rossini Op.7, and are formally inventive as well as challengingly virtuosic. His original work Nuit de Walpurgis indicates a reference to a Faust opera on the frontispiece, but was more probably an original piece inspired by a work by Mendelssohn, which was in turn based on a poem, De Erste Walpugisnacht, by Goethe (as detailed in a Wikipedia article on the subject). His oeuvre is a testament to his originality as inspired by his contemporaries, rather than simply creating stock sets of variations for the potential market among amateur guitarists. Although praised by Hector Berlioz in 1859, as well as by Rossini and Paganini, Zani de Ferranti found the 1850s to be a period of decline and financial difficulty. He died in Pisa in November 1878.

His son, Giulio Cesare Ziani de Ferranti (who changed his family name from Zani de Ferranti to Ziani de Ferranti), moved from Belgium to Liverpool, where he became a portrait photographer, setting up a studio with his father-in-law, the portrait artist William Scott, father of his wife Juliana Szczepanowska. Giulio Cesare and Juliana's son, the inventor Sebastian Ziani de Ferranti, established the electronic engineering firm Ferranti in the family name.
