= Transient recovery voltage =

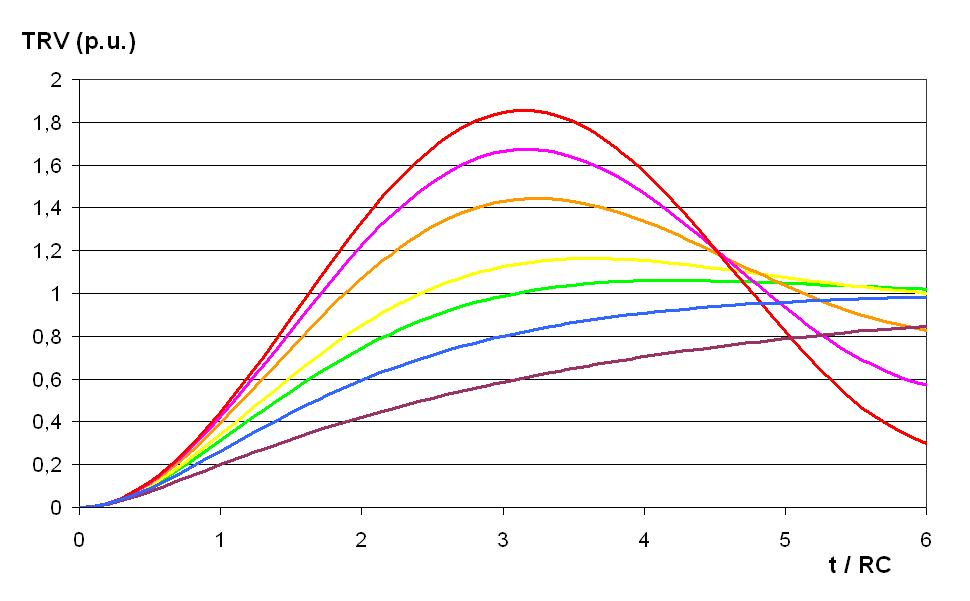
Examples of TRV waveshapes

A transient recovery voltage (TRV) for high-voltage circuit breakers is the voltage that appears across the terminals after current interruption. It is a critical parameter for fault interruption by a high-voltage circuit breaker, its characteristics (amplitude, rate of rise) can lead either to a successful current interruption or to a failure (called reignition or restrike).

The TRV is dependent on the characteristics of the system connected on both terminals of the circuit-breaker, and on the type of fault that this circuit breaker has to interrupt (single, double or three-phase faults, grounded or ungrounded fault...).

Characteristics of the system include:

- type of neutral (effectively grounded, ungrounded, solidly grounded...)
- type of load (capacitive, inductive, resistive)
- type of connection: cable connected, line connected...

The most severe TRV is applied on the first pole of a circuit-breaker that interrupts current (called the first-pole-to-clear in a three-phase system). The parameters of TRVs are defined in international standards such as IEC and IEEE (or ANSI).

== Capacitive load ==
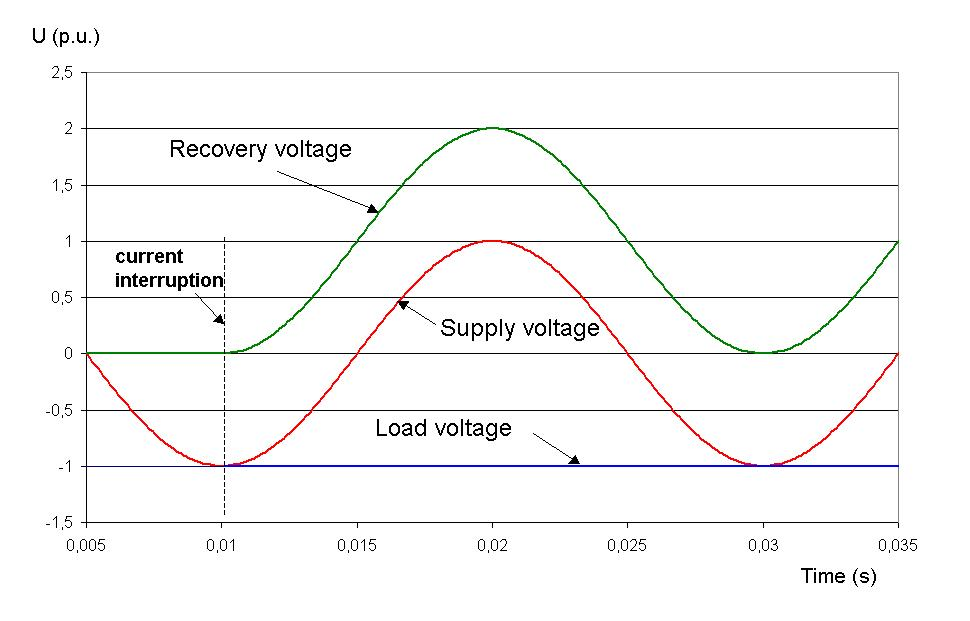
Figure 1 - Recovery voltage in case of a capacitive load

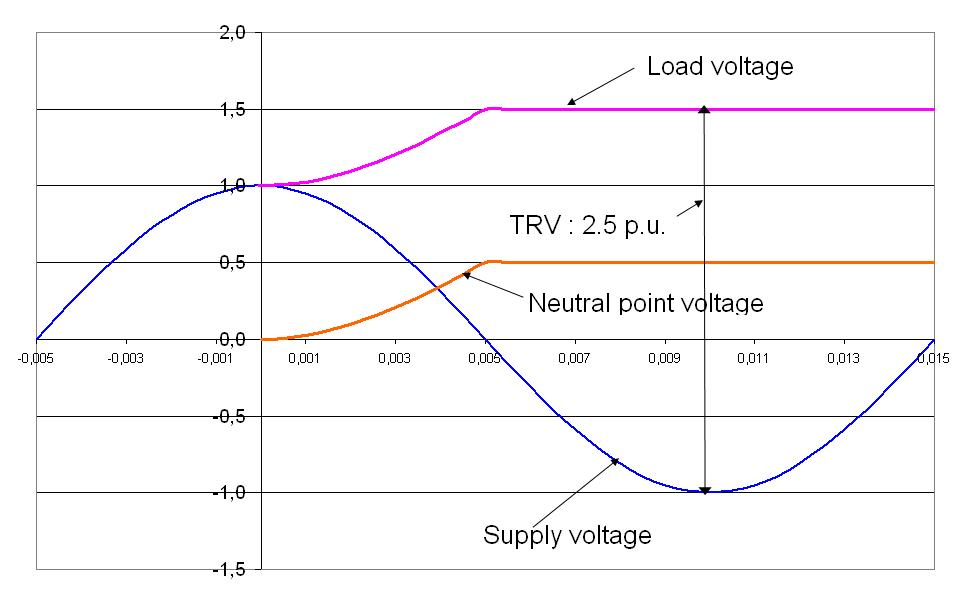
Figure 2 - Voltages on terminals of the first pole that clears three-phase capacitive currents in a system with isolated neutral

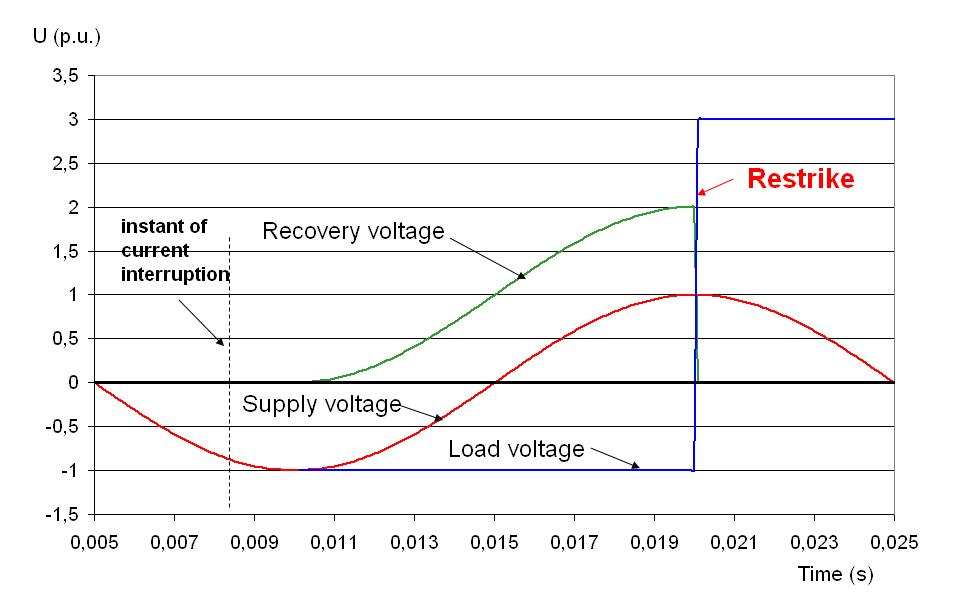
Figure 3 - Evolution of voltages with restrike occurring a half cycle after current interruption, in the case of single-phase capacitive current switching

Typical cases of capacitive loads are unloaded lines and capacitor banks.

== Inductive circuit ==
=== Terminal fault ===
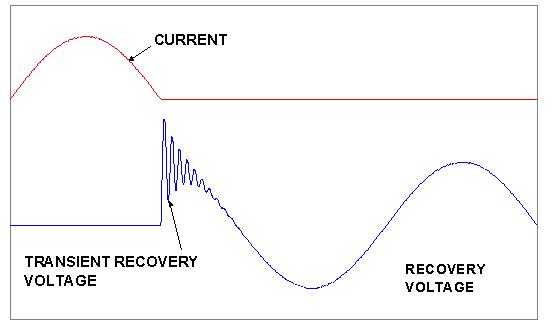
Figure 4 - TRV in inductive circuit

A terminal fault is a fault that occurs at the circuit breaker terminals. The circuit breaker interrupts a short-circuit at current zero, at this instant the supply voltage is maximum and the recovery voltage tends to reach the supply voltage with a high frequency transient. The normalized value of the overshoot or amplitude factor is 1.4.

=== Short-line-fault ===
A short-line-fault is a fault that occurs on a line a few hundred meters to several kilometers down the line from the circuit breaker terminal. As shown on Figure 5, the TRV is characterized, in its initial part, by a steep rate-of-rise due to a high-frequency oscillation produced by travelling waves that travel on the line with positive and negative reflections at the circuit breaker terminal and at the fault point, respectively. The superposition of these travelling waves gives the voltage profiles on the line shown on Figures 6 to 14 with, on the horizontal axis, the circuit breaker terminal position on the left and the short-circuit point on the right.

The voltage profile is given at different instants after current interruption, where T_{L} is time needed for a wave to travel from the circuit breaker down the line and back to the circuit breaker terminal.

Figure 15 shows, as function of time, the variation of voltage on the line-side terminal of the circuit breaker. The voltage variation is two times the initial voltage if losses are neglected, in reality it is approximately 1.6 times the initial voltage. The triangular waveshape of voltage on the line-side terminal, combined with a supply-side voltage variation at a lower frequency, produces the sawtooth variation of TRV shown on Figure 5.

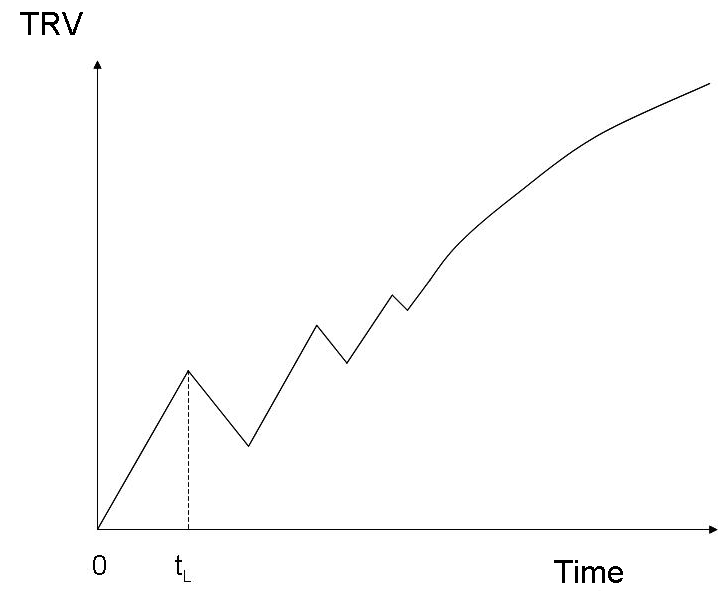
Figure 5 - TRV in case of short-line-fault.

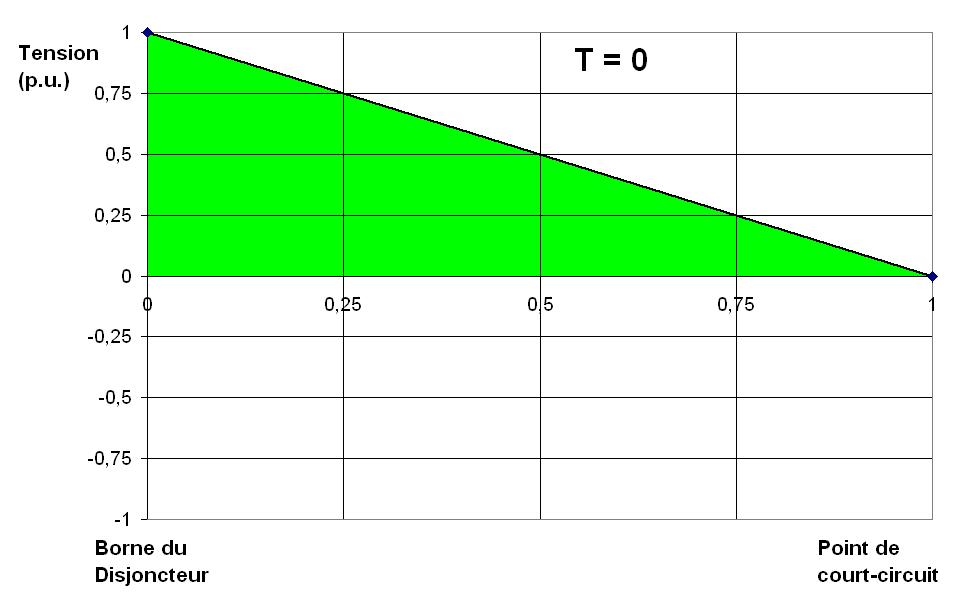
Figure 6 - Instant 0 (instant of current interruption)

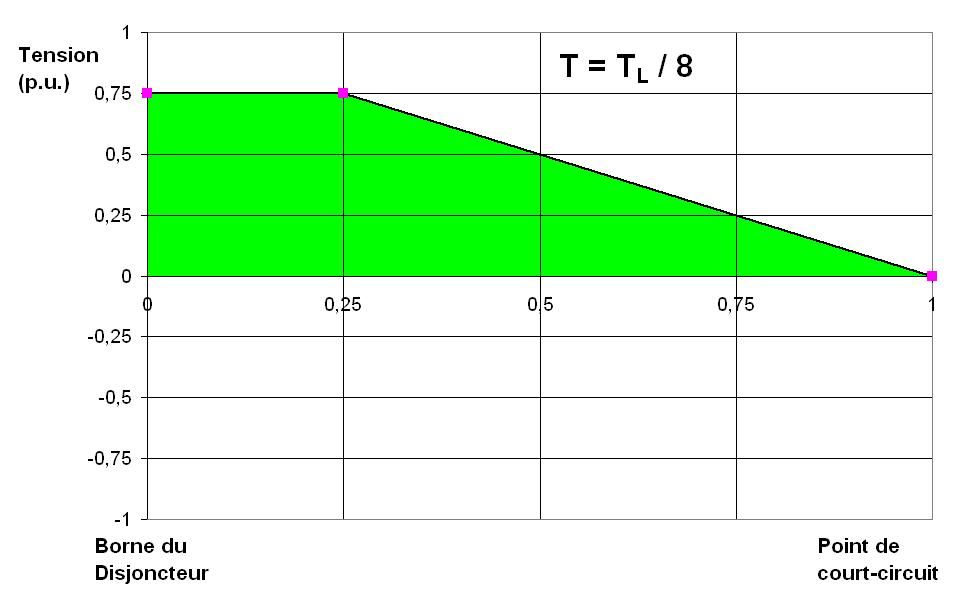
Figure 7 - Instant T_{L}/8

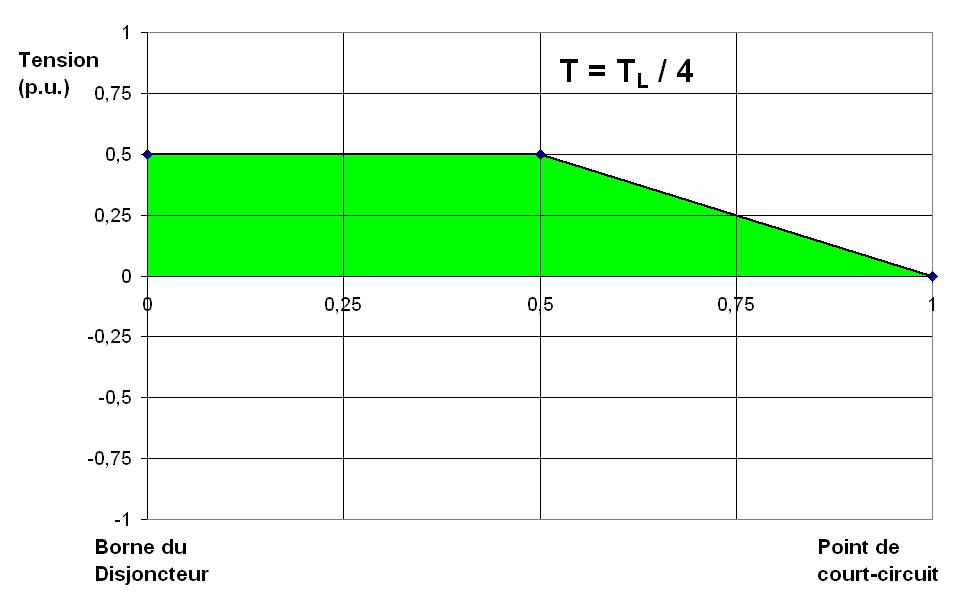
Figure 8 - Instant T_{L}/4

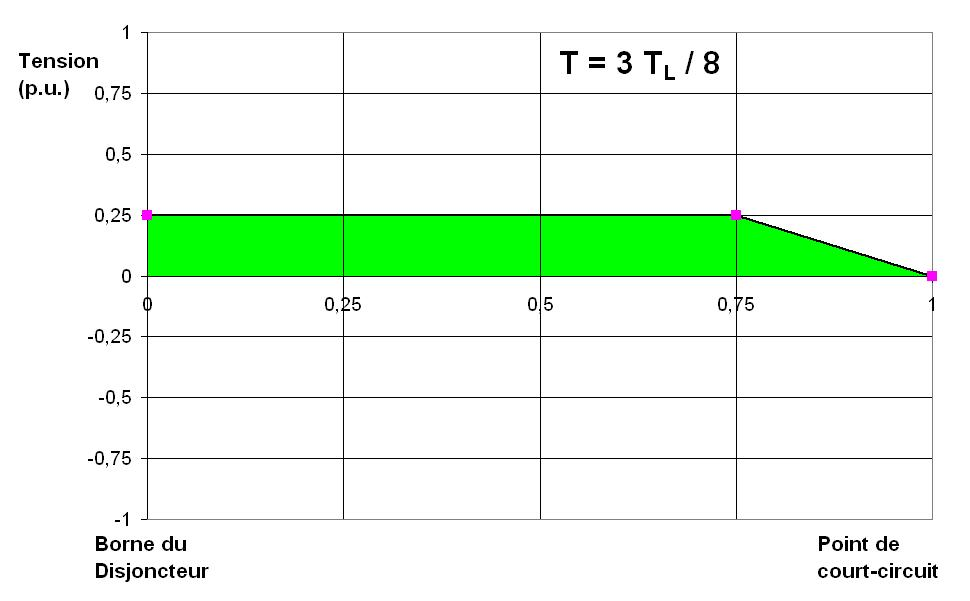
Figure 9 - Instant 3T_{L}/8

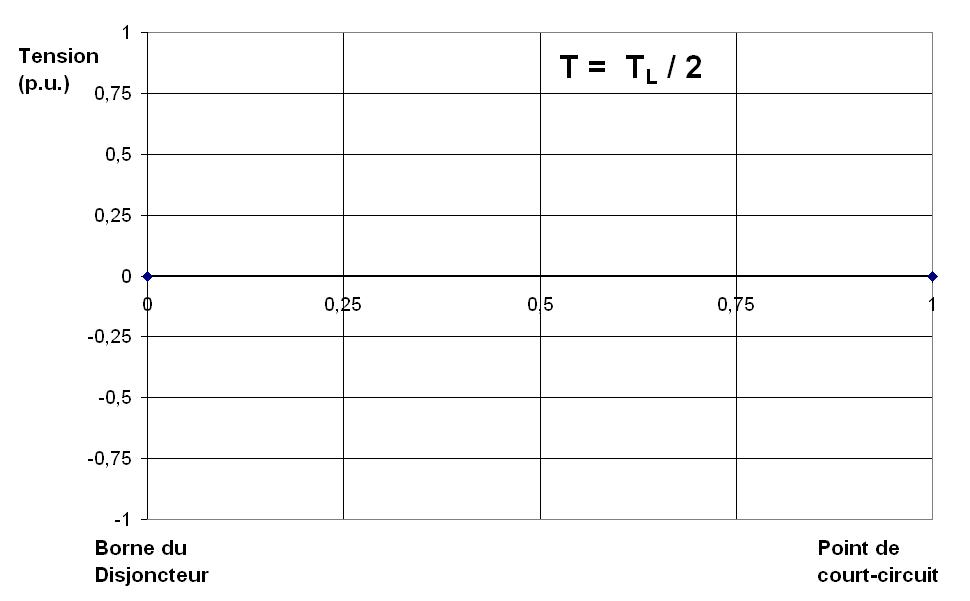
Figure 10 - Instant T_{L}/2

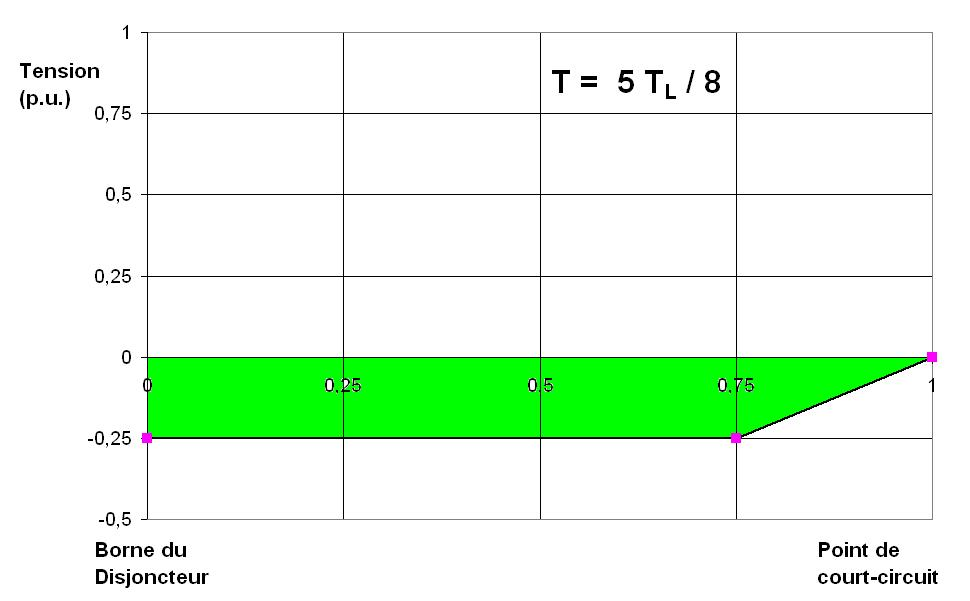
Figure 11 - Instant 5T_{L}/8

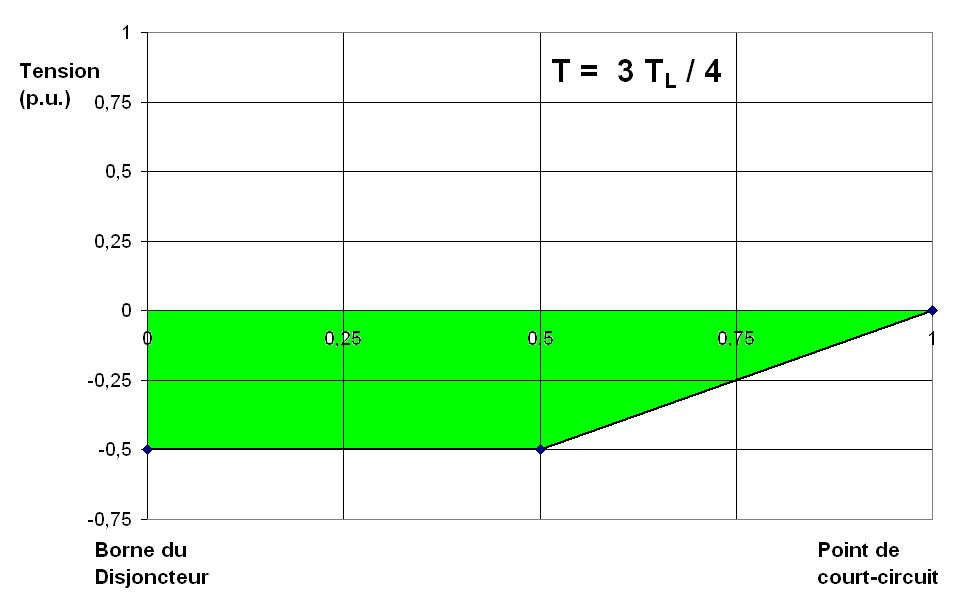
Figure 12 - Instant 3T_{L}/4

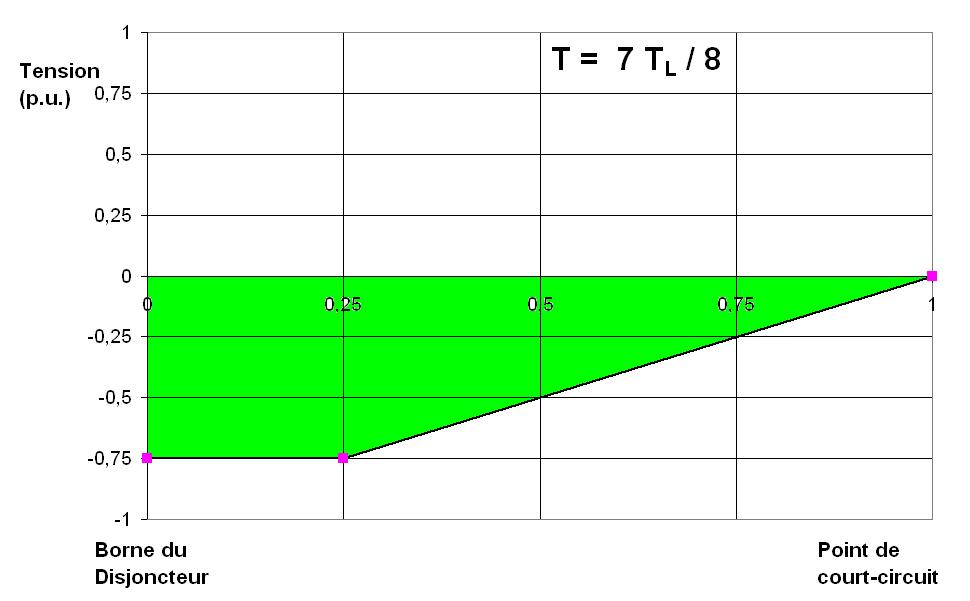
Figure 13 - Instant 7T_{L}/8

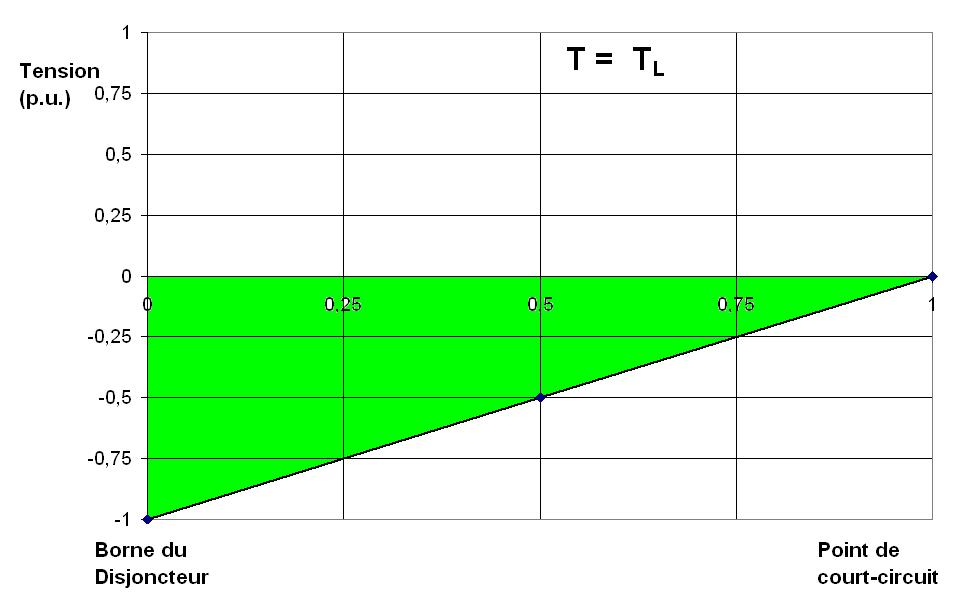
Figure 14 - Instant T_{L}

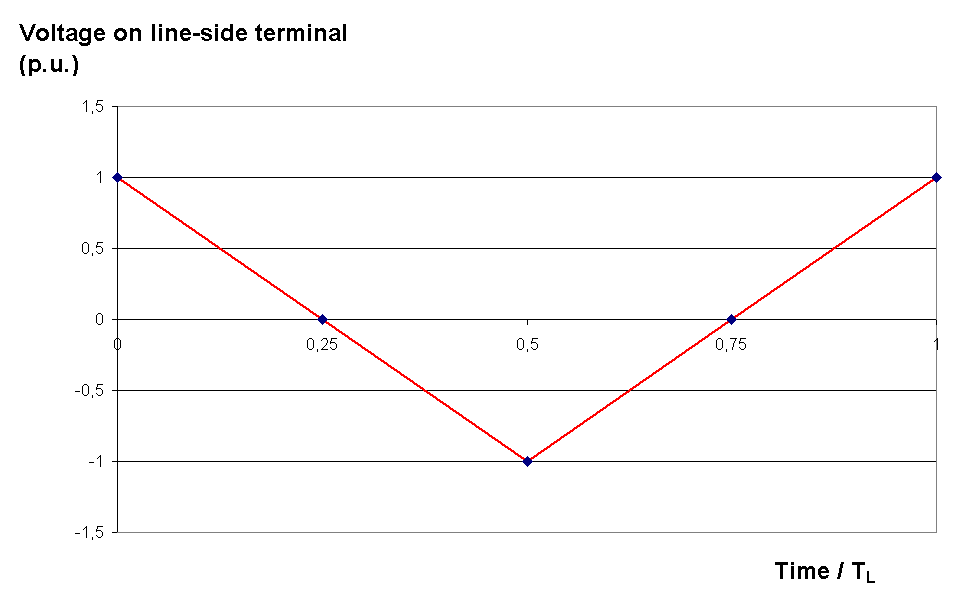
Figure 15 - Time-variation of voltage on the line-side terminal of the circuit breaker

A short-line-fault TRV is characterized by a rate-of-rise that is proportional to the slope of current at the time of interruption and therefore to the amplitude of the short-circuit current : $\frac{du}{dt} = Z{di\over dt}\,$, where Z is the surge impedance of the line.

The standardized value of Z is 450 Ω, it is equal to $\sqrt (l/c)\,$, where l and c are the line self-inductance and capacitance per unit length.

=== Out-of-phase condition ===
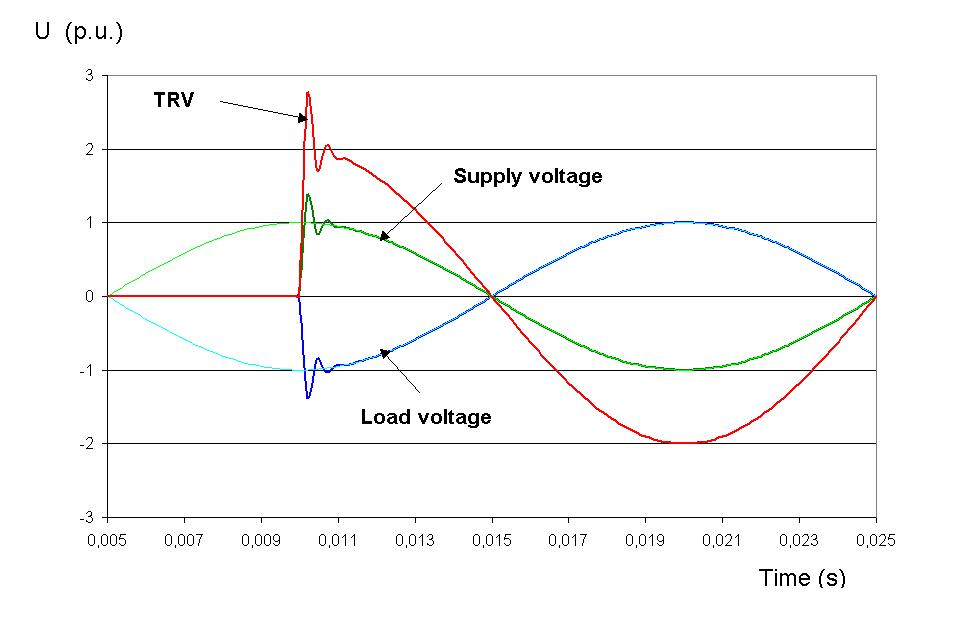
Figure 17 - TRV in out-of-phase conditions
