= Juliana Szczepanowska =

British concert pianist and author

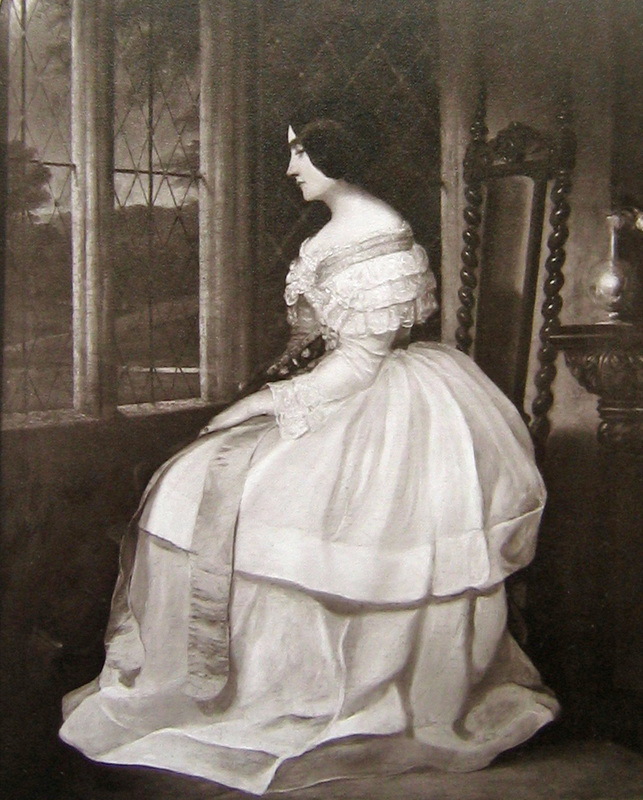
- portrait by William Scott
- Born: 1825
- Died: 1906 (aged 80–81)
- Occupation: Musician, writer
- Spouse(s): Stanislaw Szczepanowski
- Children: Sebastian Ziani de Ferranti
- Parent(s): William Scott

Juliana Hepzibeth Scott Szczepanowska de Ferranti (1825 – 1906) was a British concert pianist and author.

== Early life ==
She was born Juliana Hepzibeth Scott, one of five children of William Scott, a Liverpool portrait painter, and Sally Myers. In 1845, at the age of twenty, Juliana Scott married Stanislaw Szczepanowski, a Polish concert guitarist who was twelve years older, a widower, and secretly a Polish spy.

== Career ==
They toured Europe performing together and had five children, with Juliana Szczepanowska giving birth in four different cities. After the death of their baby Vincent in 1852, Stanislaw Szczepanowski abruptly disappeared.

Juliana Szczepanowska and her children returned to Liverpool, where she supported herself by teaching piano, performing recitals, and writing for magazines. She contributed to Ladies' Companion and Charles Dickens' Household Words under the name Julie de Szczepanowska.

== Personal life ==
In 1854, she met Giulio Cesare Ziani de Ferranti (son of composer Marco Aurelio Zani de Ferranti), a photographer from Belgium of Italian descent living in Liverpool. They fell in love, but her marriage could not be legally dissolved until 1859, after Stanislaw Szczepanowski had been missing for seven years. As a result, their first child, Juliet, was legally illegitimate and sent to a Belgian convent after she was born in 1858. They married in 1860 and had a son, the engineer and inventor Sebastian Ziani de Ferranti. Stanislaw Szczepanowski eventually reappeared, rendering Juliana de Ferranti a bigamist. After Szczepanowski's death, the Ferrantis remarried in 1881.
