= Lizzi Collinge =

British politician (elected 2024)

Lizzi Collinge MP
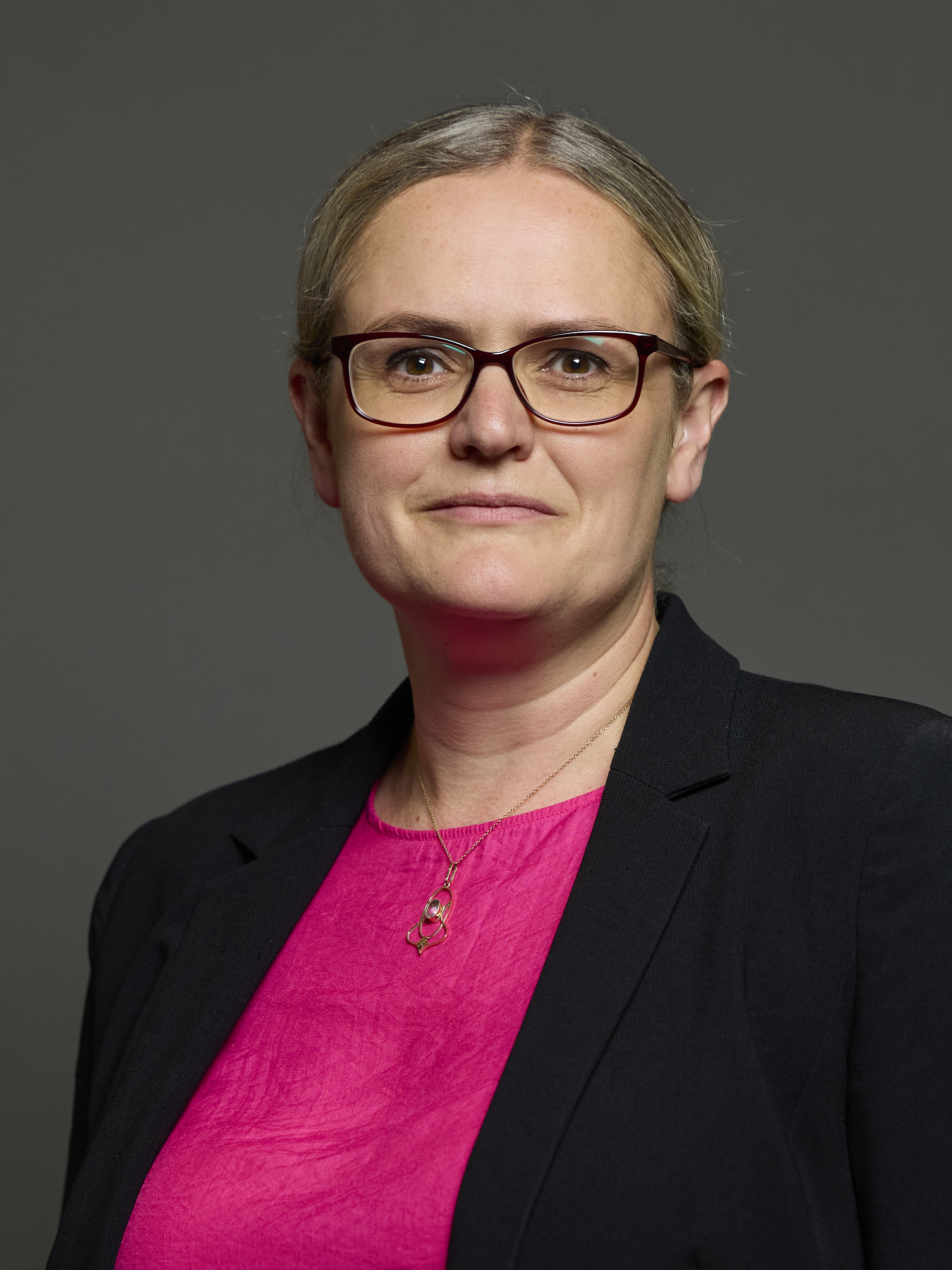
- Official portrait, 2024

Member of Parliament for Morecambe and Lunesdale
- Incumbent
- Assumed office 4 July 2024
- Preceded by: David Morris
- Majority: 5,815 (12.1%)

Personal details
- Born: Lancashire, England
- Party: Labour
- Website: www.lizzicollinge.com

Elizabeth "Lizzi" Rachel Collinge is a British Labour Party politician serving as Member of Parliament for Morecambe and Lunesdale since 2024.

== Early life and education ==
Collinge was born in Lancashire, and moved to rural Cumbria as a child. She moved to the Morecambe and Lunesdale area in 2005 after spending some time in New Zealand. She has a first class honours BA in politics and Spanish from the University of Central Lancashire (2012), after studying as a mature student.

== Political career ==
Collinge was a member of Lancashire County Council, representing Lancaster East for Labour, between 2016 and 2025.

She has expressed support for nuclear power as part of the UK's long-term energy and decarbonisation strategy, highlighting the role of nuclear power in providing reliable, low-carbon electricity, and the importance of providing jobs. There are two nuclear power stations at Heysham nuclear power station in her constituency.

== Parliamentary career ==
Collinge first stood for election in Morecambe and Lunesdale in the 2019 general election, where she came in second place with 39% of the vote behind David Morris, the incumbent Conservative MP, with 53%.

Collinge was selected in September 2023 as the Labour candidate for Morecambe and Lunesdale for the next general election. In the 2024 general election she was elected as MP for the seat, with 40.8% of the vote and a majority of 5,815 over the second-placed candidate, the Conservative David Morris who had previously represented the seat since 2010. There were five candidates, and a turnout of 63%.

The constituency's boundaries had been changed following the 2023 review of Westminster constituencies. In 2024, the constituency was made up of parts of:

- the previous Conservative-held Morecambe and Lunesdale constituency (35.1% by area and 76.3% by population of the new seat);
- the Liberal Democrat-held Westmorland and Lonsdale, which still existed with revised boundaries (46.5% by area and 18.9% by population);
- and the former Labour-held Lancaster and Fleetwood (18.4% by area and 4.8% by population).

The notional 2019 result for the area was Conservative.

Collinge was sworn in as an MP on 10 July 2024. She made her maiden speech on 22 July 2024, paying tribute to the previous MPs for the three seats making up the new constituency (David Morris, Tim Farron and Cat Smith), and to Geraldine Smith who had held Morecambe and Lunesdale from 1997 to 2010, and to the 50:50 Parliament campaign and the Labour Women's Network for their work to see more women elected. She described the constituency as "definitely the most beautiful constituency in the country".

== Personal life ==
Collinge is married to Miles, who works full-time in the NHS. They have two children and live in Heysham. She is a humanist. Collinge was elected chair of the All Party Parliamentary Humanist Group in 2025. She is the great-great-niece of fell-walker and writer Alfred Wainwright.

Parliament of the United Kingdom
| Preceded by David Morris | Member of Parliament for Morecambe and Lunesdale; 2024–present | Incumbent |
