= Viscount Boyd of Merton =

Viscountcy in the Peerage of the United Kingdom

Viscount Boyd of Merton, of Merton-in-Penninghame in the County of Wigtown, is a title in the Peerage of the United Kingdom. It was created in 1960 for the Conservative politician and former Secretary of State for the Colonies, Alan Lennox-Boyd. As of 2017 the title is held by his eldest son, the second Viscount, who succeeded in 1983.

The Hon. Sir Mark Lennox-Boyd, youngest son of the first Viscount, was also a Conservative politician.

The family seat was formerly Ince Castle, near Saltash in Cornwall.

== Viscount Boyd of Merton (1960) ==
- Alan Tindal Lennox-Boyd, 1st Viscount Boyd of Merton (1904–1983)
- Simon Donald Rupert Neville Lennox-Boyd, 2nd Viscount Boyd of Merton (born 1939)

The heir apparent is the present holder's son the Hon. Benjamin Alan Lennox-Boyd (born 1964).
The heir apparent's heir-in-line is his son Alan George Simon Lennox-Boyd (born 1993).
Arthur Rupert George Lennox-Boyd (born 2021), son of Alan George Lennox-Boyd, is his father's heir.

== Line of succession ==
- Alan Tindal Lennox-Boyd, 1st Viscount Boyd of Merton (1904–1983)
  - Simon Donald Rupert Neville Lennox-Boyd, 2nd Viscount Boyd of Merton (born 1939)
    - (1) Hon. Benjamin Alan Lennox-Boyd (born 1964)
      - (2) Alan George Simon Lennox-Boyd (born 1993)
        - (3) Arthur Rupert George Lennox-Boyd (born 2021)
        - (4) Rupert Simon David Lennox-Boyd (born 2025)
      - (5) Henry Simon Lennox-Boyd (born 1997)
    - (6) Hon. Edward George Clive (Note: He took the surname of Clive by deed poll in 1999 upon inheriting property from his maternal uncle, George Meysey Clive.) (born 1968)
      - (7) Jago George Antony Clive (born 1997)
      - (8) William Enys Clive (born 1998)

== Arms ==
Coat of arms of Viscount Boyd of Merton
Crest A dexter hand erect in pale having two fingers turned in and the rest pointing upwards Proper the wrist habited in a close sleeve Azure with cuff chequy Argent and Gules. Escutcheon Azure a fess chequy Argent and Gules between an abbatical mitre simplex of the second filleted of the third in chief and in base a rose of the second-seeded Vert and barbed of the third. Supporters Two squirrels Proper having collars chequy Argent and Gules
