= Arabella Lennox-Boyd =

Italian-born English garden designer (born 1938)

Arabella Lennox-Boyd, Lady Lennox-Boyd CBE (née Parisi; born 1938) is an Italian-born English garden designer.

== Background ==
Arabella Lennox-Boyd was born in Rome in 1938 and grew up there and at Palazzo Parisi, Oliveto, their family home. She later settled in England where she undertook a course in Landscape Architecture at Thames Polytechnic.

== Career ==
Since moving to Gresgarth Hall in Lancashire in 1978 with her family, Arabella Lennox-Boyd developed the gardens there, marrying Italian style with British plantmanship. In 1989, she formed Arabella Lennox-Boyd Landscape and Architectural Design where she heads a team of designers. She has been designing gardens for over forty-five years and has landscaped more than seven hundred gardens worldwide, including six Royal Horticultural Society (RHS) Chelsea Flower Show Gold Medal gardens, and the Best of Show winner in 1998.

Her many commissions range from commercial projects, such as the roof garden at No. I Poultry in the City of London; gardens open to the public, such as at the Serpentine Sackler Gallery in Hyde Park, and the Maggie’s Centre in Dundee; small town gardens; large country estates, including the development of large-scale master plans; and Mediterranean and tropical gardens. Her larger private projects include the gardens at Ascot House in Berkshire and at Eaton Hall, Cheshire; a garden and parkland in Dallas, Philadelphia and Rhode Island; and further gardens in France, Germany, Belgium, Italy, Spain, Austria, Switzerland, Mexico, Barbados, Canada, Ukraine, Moscow and the United States. Her client list includes Sting, Sir Terence Conran, David Gilmour (Pink Floyd) and Queen Paola of Belgium.

She is a trustee of the Chelsea Physic Garden; and the Scientific Panel of the International Dendrology Society; trustee of The Tree Register of the British Isles (T.R.O.B.I.); member of the RHS Woody Plant Committee; and a patron of Painshill Park Trust. Previously, she served as a Trustee of Kew Gardens for nine years, was a member of The Historic Parks and Gardens Panel of English Heritage and sat on the Heritage panel for six contemporary Heritage gardens. She was a founding member of the Martin McLaren Horticultural Scholarship and a member of the Council of the International Dendrology Society.

Lennox-Boyd was awarded the RHS Veitch Memorial Medal for her work in Horticulture, and an Honorary Doctorate of Design (HonDDes) from the University of Greenwich where she is also a member of The Assembly.

She is listed in House & Garden magazine in 2021, as one of the top 50 garden designers in the UK.

== Marriages ==
Arabella Parisi married her first husband, Philippe Lacloche Dehaulme de Vallombreuse, a son of Nathalie Volpi, Countess di Misurata (née Nathalie El-Kanoui), by her first husband. They were divorced and had one daughter, Dominique.

She married her second husband, Mark Lennox-Boyd (1943–2025), youngest son of Alan Lennox-Boyd, 1st Viscount Boyd of Merton, on 29 June 1974; he was knighted in 1994 and became Sir Mark Lennox-Boyd. They have one child, Patricia.
