= Westmorland and Furness Council elections =

Local government elections in Cumbria, England

Westmorland and Furness Council elections are to be held every four years from 2027 onwards, to elect all 65 members of Westmorland and Furness Council, a unitary authority in England. There are 33 wards, listed in List of electoral wards in Cumbria, which each elect one, two or three councillors.

== Council elections ==
Year	Seats	Liberal Democrats	Labour	Conservative	Green	Independent	Council control after election
2022	65	36	15	11	1	2	Liberal Democrats

== District result maps ==
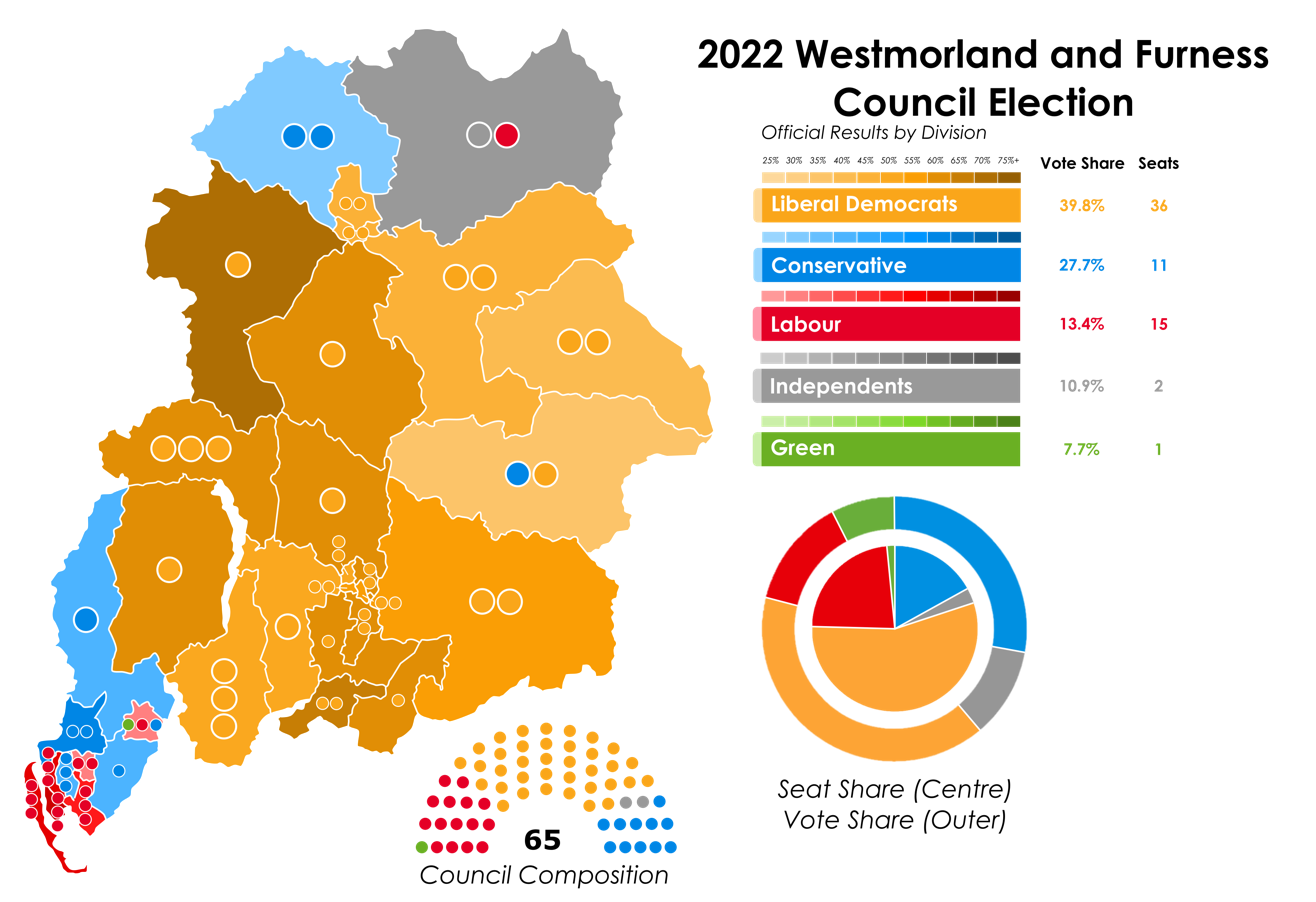
2022 results map

== By-election results ==
=== 2022-2027 ===
Old Barrow and Hindpool By-Election 4 May 2023
Party	Candidate	Votes	%	±%
Labour	Dave Cassidy	1,004	69.4	+8.8
Conservative	Derek Gawne	354	24.5	−3.7
Liberal Democrats	Stephen Pickthall	89	6.2	+1.5
Majority		650	44.9	
Turnout		1,447	17.77	−3.33
Labour hold		Swing	+6.3	

Grange and Cartmel By-Election 2 May 2024
Party	Candidate	Votes	%	±%
Liberal Democrats	Andy Hull	2,852	77.2	+20.3
Conservative	Ally Hibbert	691	18.7	−5.3
TUSC	Martin Powell-Davies	151	4.2	+1.8
Majority		2,161	58.5	
Turnout		3,694		
Liberal Democrats hold		Swing		

Grange and Cartmel By-Election 17 October 2024
Party	Candidate	Votes	%	±%
Liberal Democrats	Tim Bloomer	2,180	84.8	+37.5
Conservative	Tor McLaren	392	15.2	−4.0
Majority		1,788	69.6	
Turnout		2,572		
Liberal Democrats hold		Swing		

Kirkby Stephen and Tebay By-Election 31 October 2024
Party	Candidate	Votes	%	±%
Liberal Democrats	Adrian Waite	887	82.7	+48.8
Conservative	Pat Bell	186	17.3	−24.6
Majority		701	65.4	
Turnout		1,073		
Liberal Democrats gain from Conservative		Swing		

Eamont and Shap By-Election 27 February 2025
Party	Candidate	Votes	%	±%
Liberal Democrats	Nicki Vecqueray	789	67.2	+1.5
Conservative	Hector Harold Meanwell	241	20.5	−13.8
Putting Cumbria First	Jonathan Davies	76	6.5	N/A
Green	Pamela Pottinger	68	5.8	N/A
Majority		548		
Turnout		1,175	34.07	−11.48
Liberal Democrats hold		Swing	+7.6	

Penrith South By-Election 12 March 2026
Party	Candidate	Votes	%	±%
Liberal Democrats	Barbara Jayson	749	43.2	−1.5
Reform	Michael Houston	588	33.9	+33.9
Green	Emilia Hoffmann	225	13.0	+2.6
Conservative	Maiki Tolmie	173	10.0	−15.5
Majority		161	9.3	
Turnout		1,735		
Liberal Democrats hold		Swing		

Hawcoat and Newbarns By-Election 4 June 2026
Party	Candidate	Votes	%	±%
Reform	Hazel Edwards	1,139	48.4	+48.4
Labour	Mike Leach	576	24.5	−9.8
Conservative	Marco Fawcett	447	19.0	−21.5
Green	Rebekah Atkinson	121	5.1	+5.1
Liberal Democrats	Stephen Pickthall	69	2.9	−2.7
Majority		563	23.9	
Turnout		2,352		
Reform gain from Conservative		Swing		
