= Poulton-le-Sands =

Village in Lancashire, England

Coordinates: 54.074°N 2.858°W

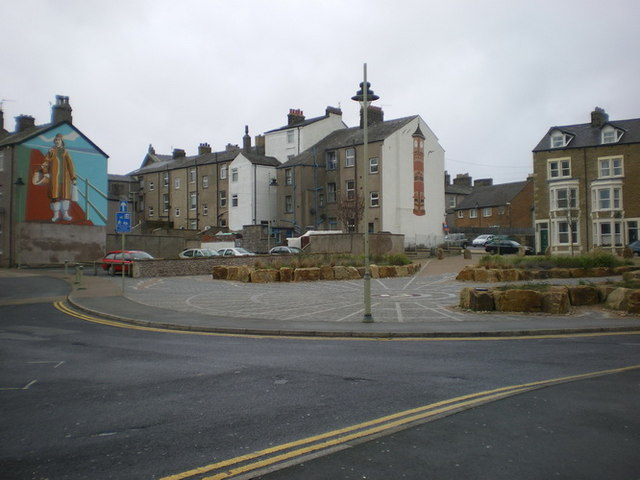
Fisherman's Square with murals

Poulton-le-Sands is one of three small villages that combined to create Morecambe, Lancashire, England, the other two being Torrisholme and Bare. A local board of health was established in 1852, which, taking its name from Morecambe Bay, became the borough of Morecambe in 1902.

Poulton is known locally for its many murals which depict the origin of Poulton as a fishing village. Artist Patricia Haskey-Knowles completed several of these in the Morecambe Bay area.

Poulton was first mentioned in the Domesday Book as Poltune. It later became Poulton and remained this way for a number of centuries. The name 'Poulton' is likely a combination of Old English pull or pōl, meaning 'pool' and tūn meaning 'farmstead'. It was towards the end of the eighteenth or the beginning of the nineteenth century that the Le-Sands was added. This was to distinguish it from another Poulton located near Blackpool which is now Poulton-le-Fylde.
