= Ince Castle =

Grade I listed house in Saltash, Cornwall, England

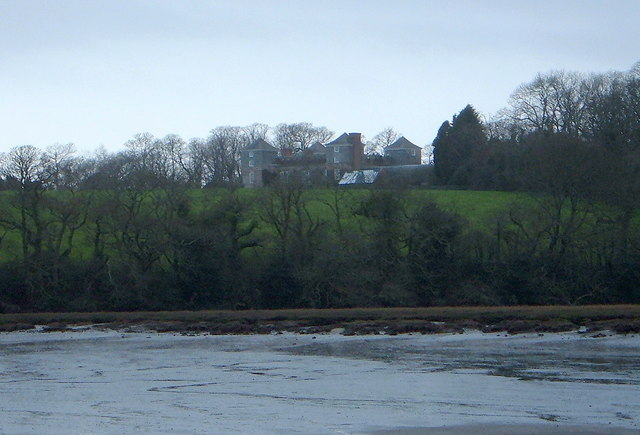

- Location within Cornwall
- 50.38669°N 4.25022°W
- Location: Saltash, Cornwall, England

History
- Built: 17th century

Listed Building – Grade I
- Designated: 17 January 1952
- Reference no.: 1329260

Ince Castle (Cornish: Kastel Enys) is three miles (5 km) from Saltash in Cornwall, England, UK. It is not a castle in the conventional sense, but a manor house built of brick. It was built in 1642, at the start of the English Civil War and was captured in 1646. Attached to the house are four three-storey towers with walls 1.2 metres thick. There is a classical portico and the windows are rectangular. The house and estate were sold in the 1850s and let as a farm but it became increasingly run down and covered in ivy by the 20th century. It burnt down in 1988 but it has now been rebuilt.

== History ==
The house is on a peninsula by the River Lynher, from which the name comes, Ince being a form of the Cornish enys ("island"). The first house may have been built by the Courtenays in the late 14th century. It later came into the possession of the Killigrews who remodelled the house entirely. Henry Killigrew, the Royalist MP for West Looe, who modified the first house in about 1642, kept four wives, one in each tower, each unknown to the others, according to tradition.

From the 1840s, the tenants farming the land were all from the same family. Richard Pryn (1774 to 1846) owned and farmed Tredown close to Ince and in 1841 (according to the census) was also farming Ince. His son, Richard Pryn (1822 to 1858) was unmarried and farmed Ince with his unmarried sister Anne (1817 to 1889) from 1846 to 1858. The property was known as Ince Barton and was 90 acres (360,000 m^{2}) at this time. After Richard's death from drowning, his sister Anne was joined by another unmarried sister Mary Ann (1828 to 1910). After Anne's death in 1889, the tenancy passed to her great nephew, Hannibal Steed (1856 to ?) whose descendants continued to farm Ince until the early 20th century (1910 or later). The owner from 1922 to 1937 was H. R."Bobby" Somerset, whose yacht, Jolie Brise, was a multiple winner of the Fastnet Race and was kept in the boathouse at Ince Castle. Ince's next occupants were Scottish yachtsman James Bryce Allan (1893-1960) and his wife, stage and silent screen actress Rita Jolivet.

In 1960 the house was bought by Patricia, Viscountess Boyd of Merton (daughter of the 2nd Earl of Iveagh), wife of the 1st Viscount Boyd of Merton, the former Colonial Secretary.

About this time, the lower floor French windows were installed to bring more light into the house and the service wing was extended. A disastrous fire in 1988 was followed by rebuilding of the roof and a second kitchen was added. The former owners, the Viscount and Viscountess Boyd of Merton, moved to Ince Castle in 1994. The house and gardens are only occasionally open to the public.

In October 2018 the house was sold for £7 Million (Source land Registry £7,000,030 Oct 31 2018) to a South African.

== Gardens ==
In the gardens there is a paved courtyard with a Magnolia delavayi and two specimens of Magnolia grandiflora. On the south side there is a sunken garden with a great variety of plants. There are curved beds in the lawn planted with shrubs and herbaceous plants. On the northeast a cherry walk leads towards a woodland garden. By the house there are two contrasting gardens: a white garden and a garden of warm colours and contrasting grey leaves.

== See also ==
- Castles in Great Britain and Ireland
- List of castles in England
