= Torrisholme =

Suburb of Morecambe, Lancashire, England

Coordinates: 54.066°N 2.830°W

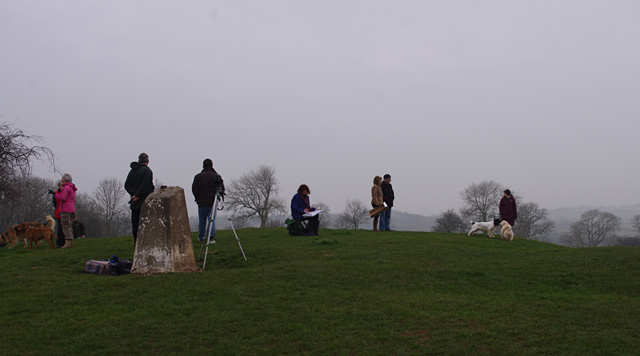
- People watching the solar eclipse of 20 March 2015, on Torrisholme Barrow

- Location in Morecambe Location in the City of Lancaster district Location within Lancashire
- Population: 6,755 (in 2011)
- OS grid reference: SD455637
- Civil parish: Morecambe
- District: Lancaster
- Shire county: Lancashire
- Region: North West
- Country: England
- Sovereign state: United Kingdom
- Post town: MORECAMBE
- Postcode district: LA4
- Dialling code: 01524
- Police: Lancashire
- Fire: Lancashire
- Ambulance: North West
- UK Parliament: Morecambe and Lunesdale

Torrisholme is a suburb of Morecambe, Lancashire, on the North West coast of England. In the 2001 census, the Torrisholme Ward had a population of 6,758 living in 3,118 households, decreasing marginally to 6,755 at the 2011 Census.

Torrisholme was referred to as Toredholme in the Domesday Book.

== Geography ==
Torrisholme is a suburban village, east of the centre of Morecambe. Poulton-le-Sands is north-west of the village with Bare located to the north. The boundary with Bare is formed by the Morecambe Branch Line, on which Bare Lane railway station is situated. East of the village is Skerton, a suburb of Lancaster.

== Landmarks ==
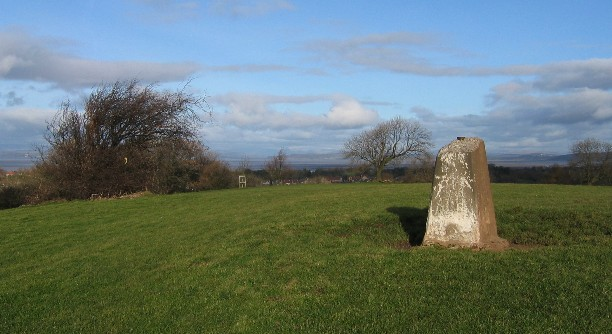
Triangulation pillar on Torrisholme Barrow

Torrisholme Barrow, a drumlin feature to the north of the village, is a mound that provides 360-degree views over Morecambe Bay and the city of Lancaster. There is a triangulation pillar on the summit. A Bronze Age round barrow, also at the summit at grid reference SD460642, is a Scheduled Ancient Monument.

== Governance ==
Torrisholme formed part of the Poulton, Bare and Torrisholme township. A local board was established in 1852, which became the borough of Morecambe in 1902. The village is now part of the City of Lancaster district.

== Education ==
Lancaster and Morecambe College, a further education college, is in Torrisholme ward, between Torrisholme and Lancaster.

Torrisholme Community Primary School is also in Torrisholme and supports children from reception to year 6. Opened in 1961, it was one of the first schools, under the auspices of the Lancashire Education Committee, to teach in metric. Although the formal policy of Metrication in the United Kingdom only started in 1965, children from the 1961 intake onwards were taught entirely in metric.

== Recreation ==
Torrisholme Cricket Club is a thriving ECB Focus Club who play on Boundary Meadow, Cross Hill Park, on the eastern fringe of the village. Founded in 1949, it has played continuously ever since, most recently in the Palace Shield.

Since 2020, the cricket club has fielded four senior teams in the Mid, West and North Lancashire competition, the Palace Shield and put out up to nine age group junior teams (both boys and girls) in the Westmorland League junior competition. With outdoor net facilities, it has in excess of 100 junior players and qualified coaches to support. It also enters the National Village Knockout Competition. Historically, Torrisholme fielded a T20 team in the now defunct Lancaster & District Midweek League and still participates in the occasional Tower Shield Knockout Competition in years when it takes place.

In 2022, the club hosted their first full County strength match for juniors with Cumbria meeting an under 12 side from Lancashire over 80 overs. Torrisholme CC also hosts Palace Shield knockout finals, most recently the Premier Competition, the Meyler Cup Final in 2018, plus Lancashire County Cricket district junior matches, local schools competitions for both girls and boys, and is used as an outground for Lancaster Royal Grammar School, the University of Lancaster, the University of Cumbria and Lancaster and Morecambe College.
