= List of electoral wards in Cumbria =

This is a list of electoral divisions and wards in the ceremonial county of Cumbria in North West England. All changes since the re-organisation of local government following the passing of the Local Government Act 1972 are shown. The number of councillors elected for each electoral division or ward is shown in brackets.

== Unitary authorities ==
=== Cumberland ===
Wards from 1 April 2023 (first election 5 May 2022):

1. Aspatria (1)
2. Belah (1)
3. Belle Vue (1)
4. Botcherby (1)
5. Bothel & Wharrels (1)
6. Brampton (1)
7. Bransty (1)
8. Castle (1)
9. Cleator Moor East & Frizington (1)
10. Cleator Moor West (1)
11. Cockermouth North (1)
12. Cockermouth South (1)
13. Corby & Hayton (1)
14. Currock (1)
15. Dalston & Burgh (1)
16. Dearham & Broughton (1)
17. Denton Holme (1)
18. Egremont (1)
19. Egremont North & St Bees (1)
20. Gosforth (1)
21. Harraby North (1)
22. Harraby South (1)
23. Harrington (1)
24. Hillcrest & Hensingham (1)
25. Houghton & Irthington (1)
26. Howgate (1)
27. Kells & Sandwith (1)
28. Keswick (1)
29. Longtown (1)
30. Maryport North (1)
31. Maryport South (1)
32. Millom (1)
33. Millom Without (1)
34. Mirehouse (1)
35. Morton (1)
36. Moss Bay & Moorclose (1)
37. Seaton (1)
38. Solway Coast (1)
39. St Michael's (1)
40. St John's & Great Clifton (1)
41. Stanwix Urban (1)
42. Thursby (1)
43. Upperby (1)
44. Wetheral (1)
45. Wigton (1)
46. Yewdale (1)

=== Westmorland and Furness ===
Wards from 1 April 2023 (first election 5 May 2022):

1. Alston & Fellside (2)
2. Appleby & Brough (2)
3. Bowness & Lyth (1)
4. Burton and Holme (1)
5. Coniston & Hawkshead (1)
6. Dalton North (2)
7. Dalton South (2)
8. Eamont & Shap (1)
9. Eden & Lyvennet Vale (2)
10. Grange & Cartmel (3)
11. Greystoke & Ullswater (1)
12. Hawcoat & Newbarns (3)
13. Hesket & Lazonby (2)
14. High Furness (1)
15. Kendal Castle (2)
16. Kendal Highgate (2)
17. Kendal Nether (2)
18. Kendal South (2)
19. Kendal Strickland & Fell (2)
20. Kent Estuary (2)
21. Kirkby Stephen & Tebay (2)
22. Levens & Crooklands (1)
23. Low Furness (1)
24. Old Barrow & Hindpool (3)
25. Ormsgill & Parkside (3)
26. Penrith North (2)
27. Penrith South (2)
28. Risedale & Roosecote (3)
29. Sedbergh & Kirkby Lonsdale (2)
30. Ulverston (3)
31. Upper Kent (1)
32. Walney Island (3)
33. Windermere & Ambleside (3)

== Former county council ==
=== Cumbria ===
Electoral Divisions from 1 April 1974 (first election 12 April 1973) to 7 May 1981:

1. Alston (1)
2. Appleby (1)
3. Aspatria & Allonby (1)
4. Barrow (Barrow Island) (1)
5. Barrow (Hawcoat) (2)
6. Barrow (Hindpool Ramsden & Centra (2)
7. Barrow (Newbarns) (3)
8. Barrow (Salthouse) (1)
9. Barrow (Walney) (2)
10. Brampton & Gilsland (1)
11. Buttermere & Brigham (1)
12. Caldbeck & Thursby (1)
13. Carlisle (Belle Vue) (1)
14. Carlisle (Currock & Denton Holme) (3)
15. Carlisle (Eden) (1)
16. Carlisle (Harraby & Petteril) (3)
17. Carlisle (Morton) (1)
18. Carlisle (St Aidans) (1)
19. Carlisle (Stanwix) (1)
20. Carlisle (Trinity) (1)
21. Cartmel (1)
22. Cleator Moor (1)
23. Cockermouth (1)
24. Crooklands (1)
25. Dalston & Cummersdale (1)
26. Dalton North (1)
27. Dalton South (1)
28. Dearham & Bothel (1)
29. Distington & Moresby (1)
30. Egremont (1)
31. Ewanrigg & Flimby (1)
32. Frizington & Ennerdale (1)
33. Grange (1)
34. Greystoke & Mungrisdale (1)
35. Hayton & Wetheral (1)
36. Hesket & Kirkoswald (1)
37. High Furness (1)
38. Kendal (Castle & Highgate) (1)
39. Kendal (Far Cross) (1)
40. Kendal (Fell & Strickland) (1)
41. Kendal (Nether) (1)
42. Kent Estuary (1)
43. Keswick & St Johns (1)
44. Kingmoor & Houghton (1)
45. Kirkby Stephen (1)
46. Lakes (1)
47. Longtown & Bewcastle (1)
48. Low Furness (1)
49. Lowther (1)
50. Maryport Central (1)
51. Millom (1)
52. Muncaster & Seascale (1)
53. Penrith East (1)
54. Penrith West (1)
55. Seaton & Winscales (1)
56. Sedbergh (1)
57. Shap (1)
58. Silloth & Holme Abbey (1)
59. St Bees & Gosforth (1)
60. Ulverston (Central North & East) (1)
61. Ulverston (South & West) (1)
62. Upper Kent (1)
63. Whitehaven (Bransty) (1)
64. Whitehaven (Hensingham) (1)
65. Whitehaven (Kells & Sandwith) (1)
66. Whitehaven (Mirehouse) (1)
67. Wigton & Kirkbride (1)
68. Windermere (1)
69. Workington (Harrington) (1)
70. Workington (Seaton & St Michael' (1)
71. Workington (South) (2)
72. Workington (St Johns) (1)

Electoral Divisions from 7 May 1981 to 7 June 2001:

1. Alston (1)
2. Appleby (1)
3. Aspatria (1)
4. Barrow Island (1)
5. Belah (1)
6. Belle Vue (1)
7. Botcherby (1)
8. Brampton & Gilsland (1)
9. Bransty (1)
10. Buttermere & Derwent (1)
11. Cartmel (1)
12. Central (1)
13. Cleator Moor North (1)
14. Cleator Moor South (1)
15. Cockermouth (1)
16. Crooklands (1)
17. Currock (1)
18. Dalston & Cummersdale (1)
19. Dalton North (1)
20. Dalton South (1)
21. Dearham & Bassenthwaite (1)
22. Denton Holme (1)
23. Distington & Moresby (1)
24. Egremont (1)
25. Far Cross (1)
26. Grange (1)
27. Greystoke & Mungrisdale (1)
28. Harraby (1)
29. Harrington & Salterbeck (1)
30. Hawcoat (1)
31. Hensingham (1)
32. Hesket & Kirkoswald (1)
33. High Furness (1)
34. Highgate (1)
35. Hillcrest (1)
36. Hindpool (1)
37. Kells (1)
38. Kent Estuary (1)
39. Keswick & St Johns (1)
40. Kingmoor & Houghton (1)
41. Kirkby Stephen (1)
42. Lakes (1)
43. Longtown & Bewcastle (1)
44. Low Furness (1)
45. Lowther & Shap (1)
46. Lyth Valley (1)
47. Maryport North (1)
48. Maryport South (1)
49. Millom (1)
50. Mirehouse (1)
51. Moorclose (1)
52. Morton (1)
53. Nether (1)
54. Newbarns (1)
55. Ormsgill (1)
56. Parkside (1)
57. Penrith North West (1)
58. Penrith South East (1)
59. Risedale (1)
60. Roosecote (1)
61. Seascale & Whicham (1)
62. Seaton & Winscales (1)
63. Sedbergh & Kirkby Lonsdale (1)
64. Silloth & Holme Abbey (1)
65. St Aidans (1)
66. St Bees & Gosforth (1)
67. St Johns (1)
68. St Michaels (1)
69. Stanwix Urban (1)
70. Strickland & Fell (1)
71. Trinity (1)
72. Ulverston East (1)
73. Ulverston West (1)
74. Upper Kent (1)
75. Upperby (1)
76. Walney North (1)
77. Walney South (1)
78. Warnell (1)
79. Westfield (1)
80. Wetheral (1)
81. Wigton (1)
82. Windermere (1)
83. Yewdale (1)

Electoral Divisions from 7 June 2001 to 2 May 2013:

1. Alston & East Fellside (1)
2. Appleby (1)
3. Aspatria & Wharrels (1)
4. Belah (1)
5. Belle Vue (1)
6. Botcherby (1)
7. Bowness, Thursby & Caldbeck (1)
8. Brampton & Gilsland (1)
9. Bransty (1)
10. Cartmel (1)
11. Castle (1)
12. Cleator Moor North & Frizington (1)
13. Cleator Moor South & Egremont (1)
14. Cockermouth East (1)
15. Cockermouth West (1)
16. Currock (1)
17. Dalston & Cummersdale (1)
18. Dalton North (1)
19. Dalton South (1)
20. Dearham & Broughton (1)
21. Denton Holme (1)
22. Distington & Moresby (1)
23. Eden Lakes (1)
24. Gosforth & Ennerdale (1)
25. Grange (1)
26. Greystoke & Hesket (1)
27. Harraby (1)
28. Harrington, Clifton & Stainburn (1)
29. Hawcoat (1)
30. Hensingham & Arlecdon (1)
31. High Furness (1)
32. Hillcrest (1)
33. Hindpool (1)
34. Kells & Sandwith (1)
35. Kendal Castle (1)
36. Kendal Highgate (1)
37. Kendal Nether (1)
38. Kendal South (1)
39. Kendal Strickland & Fell (1)
40. Kent Estuary (1)
41. Keswick & Derwent (1)
42. Kirkby Stephen (1)
43. Lakes (1)
44. Longtown & Bewcastle (1)
45. Low Furness (1)
46. Lower Kentdale (1)
47. Lyth Valley (1)
48. Maryport East (1)
49. Maryport West (1)
50. Millom (1)
51. Mirehouse (1)
52. Moorclose (1)
53. Morton (1)
54. Moss Bay (1)
55. Newbarns (1)
56. Old Barrow (1)
57. Ormsgill (1)
58. Parkside (1)
59. Penrith East (1)
60. Penrith North (1)
61. Penrith Rural (1)
62. Penrith West (1)
63. Risedale (1)
64. Roosecote (1)
65. Seascale & Whicham (1)
66. Seaton (1)
67. Sedbergh & Kirkby Lonsdale (1)
68. Solway Coast (1)
69. St Aidans (1)
70. St Bees & Egremont (1)
71. St John's (1)
72. St Michael's (1)
73. Stanwix & Irthington (1)
74. Stanwix Urban (1)
75. Ulverston East (1)
76. Ulverston West (1)
77. Upper Kent (1)
78. Upperby (1)
79. Walney North (1)
80. Walney South (1)
81. Wetheral (1)
82. Wigton (1)
83. Windermere (1)
84. Yewdale (1)

Electoral Divisions from 2 May 2013 to 1 April 2023:

1. Alston & East Fellside (1)
2. Appleby (1)
3. Aspatria (1)
4. Belah (1)
5. Belle Vue (1)
6. Botcherby (1)
7. Bothel & Wharrels (1)
8. Brampton (1)
9. Bransty (1)
10. Cartmel (1)
11. Castle (1)
12. Cleator Moor East & Frizington (1)
13. Cleator Moor West (1)
14. Cockermouth North (1)
15. Cockermouth South (1)
16. Corby & Hayton (1)
17. Currock (1)
18. Dalston & Burgh (1)
19. Dalton North (1)
20. Dalton South (1)
21. Dearham & Broughton (1)
22. Denton Holme (1)
23. Eden Lakes (1)
24. Egremont (1)
25. Egremont North & St Bees (1)
26. Gosforth (1)
27. Grange (1)
28. Greystoke & Hesket (1)
29. Harraby North (1)
30. Harraby South (1)
31. Harrington (1)
32. Hawcoat (1)
33. High Furness (1)
34. Hillcrest & Hensingham (1)
35. Hindpool (1)
36. Houghton & Irthington (1)
37. Howgate (1)
38. Kells & Sandwith (1)
39. Kendal Castle (1)
40. Kendal Highgate (1)
41. Kendal Nether (1)
42. Kendal South (1)
43. Kendal Strickland & Fell (1)
44. Kent Estuary (1)
45. Keswick (1)
46. Kirkby Stephen (1)
47. Lakes (1)
48. Longtown (1)
49. Low Furness (1)
50. Lower Kentdale (1)
51. Lyth Valley (1)
52. Maryport North (1)
53. Maryport South (1)
54. Millom (1)
55. Millom Without (1)
56. Mirehouse (1)
57. Morton (1)
58. Moss Bay & Moorclose (1)
59. Newbarns & Parkside (1)
60. Old Barrow (1)
61. Ormsgill (1)
62. Penrith East (1)
63. Penrith North (1)
64. Penrith Rural (1)
65. Penrith West (1)
66. Risedale (1)
67. Roosecote (1)
68. Seaton (1)
69. Sedbergh & Kirkby Lonsdale (1)
70. Solway Coast (1)
71. St Michael’s (1)
72. St John’s & Great Clifton (1)
73. Stanwix Urban (1)
74. Thursby (1)
75. Ulverston East (1)
76. Ulverston West (1)
77. Upper Kent (1)
78. Upperby (1)
79. Walney North (1)
80. Walney South (1)
81. Wetheral (1)
82. Wigton (1)
83. Windermere (1)
84. Yewdale (1)

== Former district councils ==
=== Allerdale ===
Wards from 1 April 1974 (first election 7 June 1973) to 3 May 1979:

1. No. 1 (Workington: St Michaels & Seaton) (5)
2. No. 2 (Workington: South) (6)
3. No. 3 (Workington: St Johns) (4)
4. No. 4 (Workington: Harrington) (2)
5. No. 5 (Cockermouth) (4)
6. No. 7 (Maryport: South) (1)
7. No. 8 (Maryport: North) (1)
8. Aspatria (2)
9. Binsey (1)
10. Boltons (1)
11. Broughton (1)
12. Clifton (1)
13. Crummock (1)
14. Dalton (1)
15. Dearham (1)
16. Derwent Valley (1)
17. Ellen (1)
18. Ellenborough (2)
19. Ewanrigg (2)
20. Flimby (1)
21. Keswick (3)
22. Marsh (1)
23. Seaton Moor (3)
24. Silloth (2)
25. St Bridgets (1)
26. Tarns (1)
27. Wampool (1)
28. Warnell (1)
29. Waver (1)
30. Wigton (3)

Wards from 3 May 1979 to 6 May 1999:

Wards from 6 May 1999 to 2 May 2019:

1. All Saints (3)
2. Aspatria (2)
3. Boltons (1)
4. Broughton St Bridget's (2)
5. Christchurch (2)
6. Clifton (1)
7. Crummock (1)
8. Dalton (1)
9. Derwent Valley (1)
10. Ellen (2)
11. Ellenborough (2)
12. Ewanrigg (2)
13. Flimby (1)
14. Harrington (2)
15. Holme (1)
16. Keswick (3)
17. Marsh (1)
18. Moorclose (3)
19. Moss Bay (3)
20. Netherhall (2)
21. St John's (3)
22. St Michael's (3)
23. Seaton (3)
24. Silloth (2)
25. Solway (1)
26. Stainburn (1)
27. Wampool (1)
28. Warnell (1)
29. Waver (1)
30. Wharrels (1)
31. Wigton (3)

Wards from 2 May 2019 to 1 April 2023:

1. All Saints (3)
2. Allhallows & Waverton (1)
3. Aspatria (2)
4. Boltons (1)
5. Broughton St Bridgets (2)
6. Christchurch (2)
7. Crummock & Derwent Valley (1)
8. Dalton (1)
9. Ellen & Gilcrux (2)
10. Flimby (1)
11. Harrington & Salterbeck (3)
12. Keswick (3)
13. Marsh & Wampool (2)
14. Maryport North (3)
15. Maryport South (2)
16. Moorclose & Moss Bay (3)
17. Seaton & Northside (3)
18. Silloth & Solway Coast (3)
19. St John's (3)
20. St Michael's (2)
21. Stainburn & Clifton (2)
22. Warnell (1)
23. Wigton & Woodside (3)

=== Barrow-in-Furness ===
Wards from 1 April 1974 (first election 7 June 1973) to 3 May 1979:

1. No. 1 (Walney) (5)
2. No. 2 (Barrow Island) (2)
3. No. 3 (Hawcoat) (6)
4. No. 4 (Newbarns) (6)
5. No. 5 (Salthouse) (3)
6. No. 6 (Central-Hindpool-Ramsden) (5)
7. No. 8 (Dalton Central-East-North) (3)
8. Dalton South (3)

Wards from 3 May 1979 to 6 May 1999:

Wards from 6 May 1999 to 1 May 2008:

1. Barrow Island (2)
2. Central (3)
3. Dalton North (3)
4. Dalton South (3)
5. Hawcoat (3)
6. Hindpool (3)
7. Newbarns (3)
8. Ormsgill (3)
9. Parkside (3)
10. Risedale (3)
11. Roosecote (3)
12. Walney North (3)
13. Walney South (3)

Wards from 1 May 2008 to 1 April 2023:

1. Barrow Island (1)
2. Central (2)
3. Dalton North (3)
4. Dalton South (3)
5. Hawcoat (3)
6. Hindpool (3)
7. Newbarns (3)
8. Ormsgill (3)
9. Parkside (3)
10. Risedale (3)
11. Roosecote (3)
12. Walney North (3)
13. Walney South (3)

=== Carlisle ===
Wards from 1 April 1974 (first election 7 June 1973) to 5 May 1983:

1. No. 1 (Carlisle: Stanwix) (3)
2. No. 2 (Carlisle: Eden) (3)
3. No. 3 (Carlisle: St Aidans) (3)
4. No. 4 (Carlisle: Harraby) (4)
5. No. 5 (Carlisle: Petteril) (4)
6. No. 6 (Carlisle: Currock) (3)
7. No. 7 (Carlisle: Denton Holme) (3)
8. No. 8 (Carlisle: Trinity) (4)
9. No. 9 (Carlisle: Morton) (3)
10. No. 10 (Carlisle: Belle Vue) (3)
11. No. 11 (Dalston) (2)
12. No. 13 (Burgh-by-Sands) (1)
13. No. 14 (Stanwix Rural) (2)
14. No. 19 (Wetheral) (2)
15. No. 20 (Hayton) (1)
16. Arthuret (2)
17. Brampton (2)
18. Lyne (1)
19. St Cuthbert Without (1)

Wards from 5 May 1983 to 6 May 1999:

Wards from 6 May 1999 to 2 May 2019:

1. Belah (3
2. Belle Vue (3)
3. Botcherby (3)
4. Brampton (2)
5. Burgh (1)
6. Castle (3)
7. Currock (3)
8. Dalston (3)
9. Denton Holme (3)
10. Great Corby & Geltsdale (1)
11. Harraby (3)
12. Hayton (1)
13. Irthing (1)
14. Longtown & Rockcliffe (2)
15. Lyne (1)
16. Morton (3)
17. St Aidans (3)
18. Stanwix Rural (2)
19. Stanwix Urban (3)
20. Upperby (3)
21. Wetheral (2)
22. Yewdale (3)

Wards from 2 May 2019 to 1 April 2023:

1. Belah & Kingmoor (3)
2. Botcherby & Harraby North (3)
3. Brampton & Fellside (3)
4. Cathedral & Castle (3)
5. Currock & Upperby (3)
6. Dalston & Burgh (3)
7. Denton Holme & Morton South (3)
8. Harraby South & Parklands (3)
9. Longtown & the Border (3)
10. Newtown & Morton North (3)
11. Sandsfield & Morton West (3)
12. Stanwix & Houghton (3)
13. Wetheral & Corby (3)

=== Copeland ===
Wards from 1 April 1974 (first election 7 June 1973) to 3 May 1979:

1. No. 2 (Whitehaven: Harbour) (3)
2. No. 3 (Whitehaven: Hensingham) (3)
3. No. 5 (Whitehaven: Mirehouse) (3)
4. No. 7 (Frizington) (2)
5. No. 9 (Cleator Moor) (5)
6. No. 10 (Distington) (4)
7. No. 11 (Egremont) (5)
8. No. 21 (Newtown North) (1)
9. No. 22 (Newtown South) (1)
10. Beckermet (2)
11. Bootle (1)
12. Bransty (3)
13. Ennerdale (1)
14. Gosforth (1)
15. Haverigg (1)
16. Holborn Hill (2)
17. Kells (3)
18. Melthwaite (1)
19. Millom Without (1)
20. Sandwith (3)
21. Seascale (1)
22. St Bees (1)

Wards from 3 May 1979 to 6 May 1999:

Wards from 6 May 1999 to 2 May 2019:

1. Arlecdon (1)
2. Beckermet (2)
3. Bootle (1)
4. Bransty (3)
5. Cleator Moor North (3)
6. Cleator Moor South (2)
7. Distington (3)
8. Egremont North (3)
9. Egremont South (3)
10. Ennerdale (1)
11. Frizington (2)
12. Gosforth (1)
13. Harbour (3)
14. Haverigg (1)
15. Hensingham (3)
16. Hillcrest (2)
17. Holborn Hill (2)
18. Kells (2)
19. Millom Without (1)
20. Mirehouse (3)
21. Moresby (1)
22. Newtown (3)
23. St Bees (1)
24. Sandwith (2)
25. Seascale (2)

Wards from 2 May 2019 to 1 April 2023:

1. Arlecdon & Ennderdale (2)
2. Beckermet (1)
3. Black Combe & Scafell (2)
4. Cleator Moor (3)
5. Corkickle (1)
6. Distington, Lowca & Parton (2)
7. Egremont (3)
8. Gosforth & Seascale (2)
9. Hillcrest (3)
10. Kells (1)
11. Millom (3)
12. Moor Row & Bigrigg (1)
13. Moresby (1)
14. Sneckyeat (1)
15. St Bees (1)
16. Whitehaven Central (3)
17. Whitehaven South (3)

=== Eden ===
Wards from 1 April 1974 (first election 7 June 1973) to 3 May 1979:

1. No. 3 (Penrith: North & East) (5)
2. No. 4 (Penrith: South & West) (5)
3. No. 8 (Brough) (1)
4. No. 11 (Kirkby Stephen) (2)
5. No. 21 (Kirkoswald) (1)
6. No. 23 (Hesket) (2)
7. No. 24 (Skelton) (1)
8. No. 25 (Greystoke) (1)
9. Alston Moor (2)
10. Appleby (Appleby) (1)
11. Appleby (Bongate) (1)
12. Askham (1)
13. Crosby Ravensworth (1)
14. Dacre (1)
15. Eamont (1)
16. Hartside (1)
17. Kirkby Thore (1)
18. Langwathby (1)
19. Lazonby (1)
20. Long Marton (1)
21. Lowther (1)
22. Orton with Tebay (1)
23. Ravenstonedale (1)
24. Shap (1)
25. Ullswater (1)
26. Warcop (1)

Wards from 3 May 1979 to 6 May 1999:

Wards from 6 May 1999 to 1 April 2023:

1. Alston Moor (2
2. Appleby (Appleby) (1)
3. Appleby (Bongate) (1)
4. Askham (1)
5. Brough (1)
6. Crosby Ravensworth (1)
7. Dacre (1)
8. Eamont (1)
9. Greystoke (1)
10. Hartside (1)
11. Hesket (2)
12. Kirkby Stephen (2)
13. Kirkby Thore (1)
14. Kirkoswald (1)
15. Langwathby (1)
16. Lazonby (1)
17. Long Marton (1)
18. Morland (1)
19. Orton with Tebay (1)
20. Penrith Carleton (1)
21. Penrith East (2)
22. Penrith North (3)
23. Penrith Pategill (1)
24. Penrith South (2)
25. Penrith West (2)
26. Ravenstonedale (1)
27. Shap (1)
28. Skelton (1)
29. Ullswater (1)
30. Warcop (1)

=== South Lakeland ===
Wards from 1 April 1974 (first election 7 June 1973) to 3 May 1979:

1. No. 1 (Kendal: Fell & Strickland) (3)
2. No. 2 (Kendal: Castle & Highgate) (3)
3. No. 3 (Kendal: Nether) (3)
4. No. 4 (Kendal: Far Cross) (3)
5. No. 7 (Grasmere) (1)
6. No. 8 (Langdales) (1)
7. Arnside (1)
8. Beetham (1)
9. Broughton (1)
10. Burneside (1)
11. Burton & Holme (1)
12. Cartmel (1)
13. Cartmel Fell (1)
14. Colton & Haverthwaite (1)
15. Coniston (1)
16. Crake Valley (1)
17. Endmoor (1)
18. Grange (2)
19. Hawkshead (1)
20. Holker (1)
21. Hutton (1)
22. Kirkby Lonsdale (1)
23. Lakes Ambleside (2)
24. Levens (1)
25. Low Furness (1)
26. Lyth Valley (1)
27. Milnthorpe (1)
28. Pennington (1)
29. Sedbergh (3)
30. Staveley-in-Westmorland (1)
31. Ulverston Central (1)
32. Ulverston East (1)
33. Ulverston North (1)
34. Ulverston South (2)
35. Ulverston West (2)
36. Whinfell (1)
37. Windermere Applethwaite (1)
38. Windermere Bowness North (1)
39. Windermere Bowness South (1)
40. Windermere Town (1)

Wards from 3 May 1979 to 6 May 1999:

Wards from 6 May 1999 to 1 May 2008:

1. Arnside & Beetham (2)
2. Broughton (1)
3. Burneside (1)
4. Burton & Holme (1)
5. Cartmel (1)
6. Coniston (1)
7. Crake Valley (1)
8. Crooklands (1)
9. Grange (2)
10. Hawkshead (1)
11. Holker (1)
12. Kendal Castle (1)
13. Kendal Far Cross (1)
14. Kendal Fell (1)
15. Kendal Glebelands (1)
16. Kendal Heron Hill (1)
17. Kendal Highgate (1)
18. Kendal Kirkland (1)
19. Kendal Mintsfeet (1)
20. Kendal Nether (1)
21. Kendal Oxenholme (1)
22. Kendal Parks (1)
23. Kendal Stonecross (1)
24. Kendal Strickland (1)
25. Kendal Underley (1)
26. Kirkby Lonsdale (1)
27. Lakes Ambleside (2)
28. Lake Grasmere (1)
29. Levens (1)
30. Low Furness & Swarthmoor (2)
31. Lyth Valley (1)
32. Milnthorpe (1)
33. Natland (1)
34. Sedbergh (2)
35. Staveley-in-Cartmel (1)
36. Staveley-in-Westmorland (1)
37. Ulverston Central (1)
38. Ulverston East (1)
39. Ulverston North (1)
40. Ulverston South (1)
41. Ulverston Town (1)
42. Ulverston West (1)
43. Whinfell (1)
44. Windermere Applethwaite (1)
45. Windermere Bowness North (1)
46. Windermere Bowness South (1)
47. Windermere Town (1)

Wards from 1 May 2008 to 3 May 2018:

1. Ambleside & Grasmere (2)
2. Arnside & Beetham (2)
3. Broughton (1)
4. Burneside (1)
5. Burton & Holme (2)
6. Cartmel & Grange West (1)
7. Coniston & Crake Valley (1)
8. Crooklands (1)
9. Grange North (1)
10. Grange South (1)
11. Hawkshead (1)
12. Holker (1)
13. Kendal Castle (1)
14. Kendal Far Cross (1)
15. Kendal Fell (1)
16. Kendal Heron Hill (1)
17. Kendal Highgate (1)
18. Kendal Kirkland (1)
19. Kendal Mintsfeet (1)
20. Kendal Oxenholme & Natland (1)
21. Kendal Nether (1)
22. Kendal Parks (1)
23. Kendal Romney (1)
24. Kendal Stonecross (1)
25. Kendal Strickland (1)
26. Kendal Underley (1)
27. Levens (1)
28. Low Furness (1)
29. Lyth Valley (1)
30. Mid Furness (2)
31. Milnthorpe (1)
32. Sedbergh & Kirkby Lonsdale (3)
33. Staveley-in-Cartmel (1)
34. Staveley-in-Westmorland (1)
35. Ulverston Central (1)
36. Ulverston East (1)
37. Ulverston North (1)
38. Ulverston South (1)
39. Ulverston Town (1)
40. Ulverston West (1)
41. Whinfell (1)
42. Windermere Applethwaite & Troutbeck (1)
43. Windermere Bowness North (1)
44. Windermere Bowness South (1)
45. Windermere Town (1)

Wards from 3 May 2018 to 1 April 2023:

1. Ambleside & Grasmere (2)
2. Arnside & Milnthorpe (3)
3. Bowness & Levens (3)
4. Broughton & Coniston (3)
5. Burton & Crooklands (3)
6. Cartmel (2)
7. Furness Peninsula (3)
8. Grange (3)
9. Kendal East (3)
10. Kendal North (2)
11. Kendal Rural (3)
12. Kendal South & Natland (3)
13. Kendal Town (3)
14. Kendal West (3)
15. Sedbergh & Kirkby Lonsdale (3)
16. Ulverston East (3)
17. Ulverston West (3)
18. Windermere (3)

== Electoral wards by constituency ==
Wards as they existed on 1 December 2020.

=== Barrow and Furness ===
Barrow-in-Furness: Barrow Island; Central; Dalton North; Dalton South; Hawcoat; Hindpool; Newbarns; Ormsgill; Parkside; Risedale; Roosecote; Walney North; Walney South.

Copeland: Black Combe & Scafell; Millom.

South Lakeland: Broughton & Coniston (polling districts AHA, AHB, AHC, BZ, CA, CB, CL & CY); Furness Peninsula; Ulverston East; Ulverston West.

=== Carlisle ===
Carlisle: Belah & Kingmoor; Botcherby & Harraby North; Brampton & Fellside; Cathedral & Castle; Currock & Upperby; Denton Holme & Morton South; Harraby South & Parklands; Longtown & the Border; Newtown & Morton North; Sandsfield & Morton West; Stanwix & Houghton; Wetheral & Corby.

=== Morecambe and Lunesdale (part) ===
South Lakeland: Arnside & Milnthorpe; Burton & Crooklands; Sedbergh & Kirkby Lonsdale.

=== Penrith and Solway ===
Allerdale: All Saints; Allhallow & Waverton; Aspatria; Boltons; Broughton St. Bridgets; Christchurch; Crummock & Derwent Valley; Ellen & Gilcrux; Keswick; Marsh & Warmpool; Maryport North; Maryport South; Silloth & Solway Coast; Warnell; Wigton & Woodside.

Carlisle: Dalston & Burgh.

Eden: Alston Moor; Hartside; Hesket; Kirkoswald; Langwathby; Lazonby; Penrith Carleton; Penrith East; Penrith North; Penrith Pategill; Penrith South; Penrith West; Skelton.

=== Westmorland and Lonsdale ===
Eden: Appleby (Appleby); Appleby (Bongate); Askham; Brough; Crosby Ravensworth; Dacre; Eamont; Greystroke; Kirkby Stephen; Kirkby Thore; Long Marton; Morland; Orton & Tebay; Ravenstonedale; Shap; Ullswater; Warcop.

South Lakeland: Ambleside & Grasmere; Bowness & Levens; Broughton & Coniston (polling districts AF, AO, AP, AQ, AS, AT, AU, BC, BDA, BDB, CX & DH); Cartmel; Grange; Kendal East; Kendal North; Kendal Rural; Kendal South & Natland; Kendal Town; Kendal West; Windermere.

=== Whitehaven and Workington ===
Allerdale: Dalton; Flimby; Harrington & Salterbeck; Moorclose & Moss Bay; St. John’s; St. Michael’s; Seaton & Northside; Stainburn & Clifton.

Copeland: Arlecdon & Ennerdale; Beckermet; Cleator Moor; Corkickle; Distington, Lowca & Parton; Egremont; Gosforth & Seascale; Hillcrest; Kells; Moor Row & Bigrigg; Moresby; St. Bees; Sneckyeat; Whitehaven Central; Whitehaven South.

== See also ==
- List of parliamentary constituencies in Cumbria
