= David Morris (Conservative politician) =

British politician

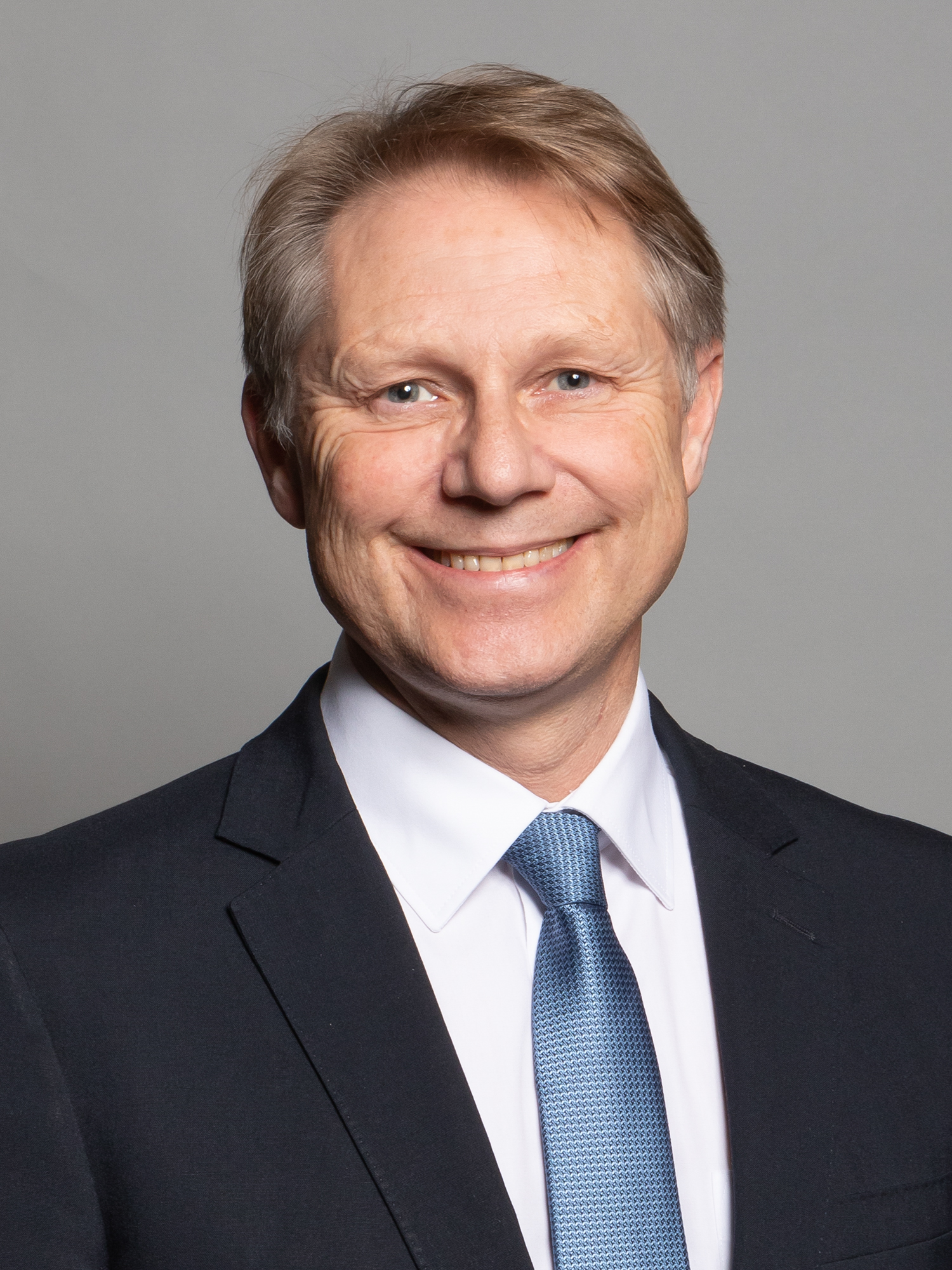

Member of Parliament for Morecambe and Lunesdale
- In office 6 May 2010 – 30 May 2024
- Preceded by: Geraldine Smith
- Succeeded by: Lizzi Collinge

Personal details
- Born: David Thomas Morris; 3 January 1966 (age 60) Leigh, Lancashire, England
- Party: Conservative
- Spouse: Emma Smith (m. 2019)
- Children: 3
- Website: David Morris

David Thomas Morris (born 3 January 1966) is a British Conservative Party politician, former musician, businessman and former Member of Parliament (MP) for Morecambe and Lunesdale serving from 2010 to 2024.

== Early life ==
Morris was born on 3 January 1966 in Leigh, Lancashire. The son of an ex-Royal Navy Lieutenant Commander who served as Director of Maritime Affairs for the Bahamas, he spent much of his youth abroad. He was privately educated at St Andrew's School in Nassau, Bahamas, Kowloon School, Hong Kong and Lowton High School in Greater Manchester.

An accomplished guitarist, Morris played in a band with Rick Astley. Morris and Astley played the Northern club circuit at night in the band Give Way – specialising in covering Beatles and Shadows songs – and FBI, a soul band which won several local talent competitions. He became a session musician and was shortlisted for Whitesnake and Duran Duran. Morris was signed under a separate management contract with the same management as Astley. He wrote songs for Stock, Aitken and Waterman, including their roster of artists such as Sonia, Brother Beyond and Jason Donovan.

== Business career ==
Failing his attempt to join the Royal Navy as an officer due to his shortsightedness, Morris followed creative pursuits. After leaving the music industry, he founded his stylist business, David Morris Hairdressing, in Leigh. He later expanded this to four other, fully equipped, salons across the Greater Manchester area. He worked as an international stylist for Pierre Alexandre International.

== Political career ==
David Morris unsuccessfully contested the seats of Blackpool South in 2001 and Carmarthen West and South Pembrokeshire in 2005, although he cut the Labour Party majority in both instances.

Morris was selected as the Conservative candidate for Morecambe and Lunesdale at the 2010 general election and won it. Defeating Labour's Geraldine Smith by 866 votes, he took the constituency on a swing greater than the national average. He was re-elected in 2015 with an increased majority of 4,590 and in 2017 with a reduced majority of 1,399.

Morris served as a Parliamentary private secretary (PPS) to the Wales, Scotland and Northern Ireland Offices. He is thought to be the first politician to have served in every department representing a devolved nation. Morris was appointed in 2014 by Prime Minister David Cameron as the first self-employment "Tsar".

Morris has served on the Science and Technology Select Committee from 2010 to 2015, the Constitutional Affairs Select Committee from 2014 to 2015 and the Administration Committee from 2014 to 2015. In Parliament, Morris currently serves on the Public Administration and Constitutional Affairs Committee.

He is the Chairman of the Conservative Friends of Nuclear Energy. Morris is involved in several All Party Parliamentary Groups (APPGs) including the Chairman of the Parliamentary Space Committee, the Coastal and Marine APPG, Classic Rock and Blues APPG and the Self Employment APPG. Morris is a member of the Armed Forces Parliamentary Scheme, for which he has the honorary title Lieutenant Commander in the Royal Navy.

Morris was opposed to Brexit before the 2016 referendum. He stated his reason for supporting remaining in the European Union was because he was "standing at the side of the Prime Minister on this one, because the Prime Minister has always stood by me and my people in Morecambe". Morecambe and Lunesdale voted narrowly to leave the European Union. Following the referendum he supported the position of his party and became committed to the UK leaving the European Union.

In September 2020, Morris was found guilty of breaching the rules on donations by the Parliamentary Standards Commission. He was found to have lobbied on behalf of Aquind Ltd, a firm led by Ukrainian-born businessman Alexander Temerko, who had donated more than £1m in total to the Conservative Party, and individual Conservative MPs. Morris himself had received a donation of £10,000 from the firm. However the Parliamentary Standards Commissioner accepted that the rules breach had been inadvertent.

Following an interim report on the connections between colonialism and properties now in the care of the National Trust, including links with historic slavery, Morris was among the signatories of a letter to The Telegraph in November 2020 from the "Common Sense Group" of Conservative Parliamentarians. The letter accused the National Trust of being "coloured by cultural Marxist dogma, colloquially known as the 'woke agenda'".

After Prime Minister Boris Johnson was fined for breaking Covid rules during the 'Partygate' scandal, Morris defended Johnson, praised his record in office and asked him to continue as Prime Minister.

Morris lost his seat in the 2024 general election, to Labour's Lizzi Collinge, who had previously come second to Morris in the 2019 general election. He came in second place with 28.7% of the vote, behind Collinge's 40.8%. The Reform UK candidate gained 16.3% of the vote, Liberal Democrat 9.9% and Green 4.3%. After the result he said "I wish everybody well out there and I'm quite happy to pass the baton on. I wish Lizzi well. We're different parties but at the end of the day we're all human beings. We have differences of opinion and that's healthy. I wish her all the best, I really do."

== Post-parliamentary career ==
After his defeat at the 2024 UK General Election, Morris took a career break, telling PoliticsHome that "it's time to go home and just chill out".

Morris now writes for GBNews.com where he comments almost exclusively about the Labour party on issues such as migration, taxes and leadership.

== Constituency campaigns ==
Morris helped secure £120 million funding for the M6 link road in his constituency.

He helped secure £10 million in funding to build the sea wall defences in Morecambe and £3 million to reinvest in the West End Gardens. He successfully lobbied the Government to fund reinforcing the Sea Wall Defences at Sunderland Point in his constituency.

Morris was also instrumental in securing £50m, the largest amount ever for a government levelling up project, for the Eden Project North for Morecambe. Following the announcement, Morris said, “Five years of work has finally come to fruition and after lobbying four Prime Ministers and six Chancellors and more meetings and debates in Parliament than I can count, I am absolutely delighted we have secured the funding for this project to go ahead. What started off as a dream has now become reality and this will secure prosperity in Morecambe for generations to come. This decision has quite literally changed Morecambe forever.”

He has been praised by his Conservative Party colleagues, such as the Chancellor George Osborne and Philip Hammond, as well as Prime Ministers David Cameron and Theresa May, for being a catalyst for regeneration in his constituency and helping to secure further funding.

Morris was credited by the Conservative Party as being pivotal in securing the site for a new nuclear power station alongside Heysham 1 and 2.

In December 2017, Morris questioned claims about child poverty in his constituency made by local schools and a doctor who appeared in an ITV news story about poverty, alleging that staff at the schools were linked to Labour's campaign group Momentum Morris posted on his Facebook page that "These claims are not those being experienced by myself or the jobcentre in the area". Morris stated on ITV that there was no proof or validity to these claims from any official source and called for social services to investigate to sort the matter out. Despite Morris' protestations, child poverty in Morecambe continues to reach the national press. With 10% of children at Morecambe Bay Primary School coming from a family using food banks, the Head Teacher has spoken out against this perceived injustice on national television.

== Expenses ==
In 2013, Morris' expenses attracted media attention after it was revealed that he had the second highest parliamentary expenses claim in the country. Criticised by his political rivals, he responded to his local newspaper that: "I am frankly insulted by the line of questioning your journalist has decided to take...My expenses are independently adjudicated by IPSA and are only paid for legitimate items."

Morris has received attention for the number of overseas trips he has received as an MP. In October 2018, it was detailed that his free trips overseas in the previous year were worth £17,994 in total and were the third highest value of any MP's trips during the year following the 2017 general election.

In May 2016, it emerged that Morris was one of a number of Conservative MPs being investigated by police in the United Kingdom general election, 2015 party spending investigation, for allegedly spending more than the legal limit on constituency election campaign expenses. However, in March 2017, Lancashire Police confirmed that no further action would be taken.

In November 2016 it was reported that Morris was being investigated for claiming £1,400 in car mileage expenses for trips in the UK on dates when he was abroad on parliamentary business. Morris disputed the allegations and said the allegations from the expenses watchdog were false.

In August 2017, Morris was accused of nepotism by the publication Private Eye after it was revealed that he employed his partner as his Senior Parliamentary Assistant on a salary up to £45,000. Morris argued that this was not nepotism as he had employed Emma Smith since 2010, which was before their relationship began. Although MPs who were first elected at or after the 2017 election have been banned from employing family members, the restriction is not retrospective – meaning that Morris' employment of his partner is lawful.

== Personal life ==
In September 2019, Morris married his partner Emma Smith in a ceremony at the Chapel of St Mary Undercroft at the Houses of Parliament. Smith served as his election agent and works as his Senior Parliamentary Assistant. Their daughter was born in September 2020. He has two sons from a previous marriage.

David Morris is a friend of the actor and musician David Hasselhoff, whom he welcomed to the House of Commons in February 2011 as part of the campaign to reopen the Morecambe Winter Gardens. He is also friends with musicians Brian May of Queen and Bernie Marsden of Whitesnake, both having helped with charitable causes in his constituency.

Parliament of the United Kingdom
| Preceded by Geraldine Smith | Member of Parliament for Morecambe and Lunesdale; 2010–2024 | Succeeded by Lizzi Collinge |
