= Mark Lennox-Boyd =

British politician (1943–2025)

The Honourable Sir Mark Lennox-Boyd
- Lennox-Boyd in 1996

Parliamentary Under-Secretary of State for Foreign and Commonwealth Affairs
- In office 24 July 1990 – 20 July 1994
- Prime Minister: Margaret Thatcher; John Major
- Preceded by: Tim Sainsbury
- Succeeded by: Liam Fox (1996)

Member of Parliament for Morecambe and Lunesdale Morecambe and Lonsdale (1979–1983)
- In office 3 May 1979 – 8 April 1997
- Preceded by: Alfred Hall-Davis
- Succeeded by: Geraldine Smith

Personal details
- Born: Mark Alexander Lennox-Boyd; 4 May 1943 Mayfair, London, England
- Died: 24 July 2025 (aged 82) Caton, Lancashire, England
- Party: Conservative
- Spouse: Arabella Parisi (m. 1974)
- Children: 1
- Parent: Alan Lennox-Boyd, 1st Viscount Boyd of Merton (father)

Sir Mark Alexander Lennox-Boyd (4 May 1943 – 24 July 2025) was a British Conservative politician who served as an MP from 1979 to 1997.

== Early life and education ==
Lennox-Boyd was born at The Dorchester in London on 4 May 1943, the third and youngest son of Alan Lennox-Boyd, 1st Viscount Boyd of Merton and his wife Lady Patricia Guinness, daughter of Rupert Guinness, 2nd Earl of Iveagh. His eldest brother was Simon Lennox-Boyd, 2nd Viscount Boyd of Merton.

He was educated at Eton and at Christ Church, Oxford from which he graduated with a BA in 1964 and an MA in 1965. He was called to the bar by Middle Temple in 1968.

== Political career ==
Lennox-Boyd contested Brent South in October 1974, being defeated by Labour's Laurie Pavitt.

He was MP for Morecambe and Lonsdale from 1979 to 1983, and the (slightly renamed) Morecambe and Lunesdale from 1983 until his defeat by Labour's Geraldine Smith in 1997. He served as Parliamentary Private Secretary to the Secretary of State for Energy from 1981 to 1983, PPS to the Chancellor of the Exchequer from 1983 to 1984, Assistant government whip from 1984 to 1986; a Lord Commissioner of HM Treasury (Government whip) from 1986 to 1988, Parliamentary Private Secretary to the Prime Minister, Margaret Thatcher from 1988 to 1990, and as a Parliamentary Under-Secretary of state in the Foreign and Commonwealth Office from 1990 to 1994.

Lennox-Boyd was knighted on 19 August 1994.

=== Later career ===
Lennox-Boyd was a member of the Court of the Fishmongers' company, Prime Warden 1998–99, and served as chairman of the company's Education and Grants committee 2010–15. He was a trustee of the Georgian Group, and was chairman between 2014 and 2015. He was a Patron of Prisoners Abroad, a charity that supports the welfare of Britons imprisoned overseas and their families, and Patron of the British Sundial Society.

== Personal life and death ==
Lennox-Boyd married Arabella Parisi on 29 June 1974. Lady Lennox-Boyd was born in Italy, but left to settle in England where she later undertook a course in Landscape Architecture at Thames Polytechnic, now part of the University of Greenwich. The couple had one daughter together, Patricia Irene Lennox-Boyd (born 13 August 1980). Arabella, Lady Lennox-Boyd, has a daughter, Dominique, from a previous marriage.

Sir Mark Lennox-Boyd died from brain cancer at Gresgarth Hall, his home in Caton, Lancashire, on 24 July 2025. He was 82.

== Sources ==
- "Times Guide to the House of Commons", Times Newspapers Limited, 1997 edition.

Parliament of the United Kingdom
Preceded by Alfred Hall-Davis	Member of Parliament for Morecambe and Lonsdale; 1979–1983	Succeeded by (constituency renamed)
Preceded by (constituency renamed)	Member of Parliament for Morecambe and Lunesdale; 1983–1997	Succeeded by Geraldine Smith
