= 2022 Westmorland and Furness Council election =

2022 UK local government election

- 5 May 2022

All 65 seats to Westmorland and Furness Council 33 seats needed for a majority
	First party	Second party	Third party
Party	Liberal Democrats	Labour	Conservative
Seats won	36	15	11
Popular vote	29,960	10,132	20,841
Percentage	39.8%	13.4%	27.7%
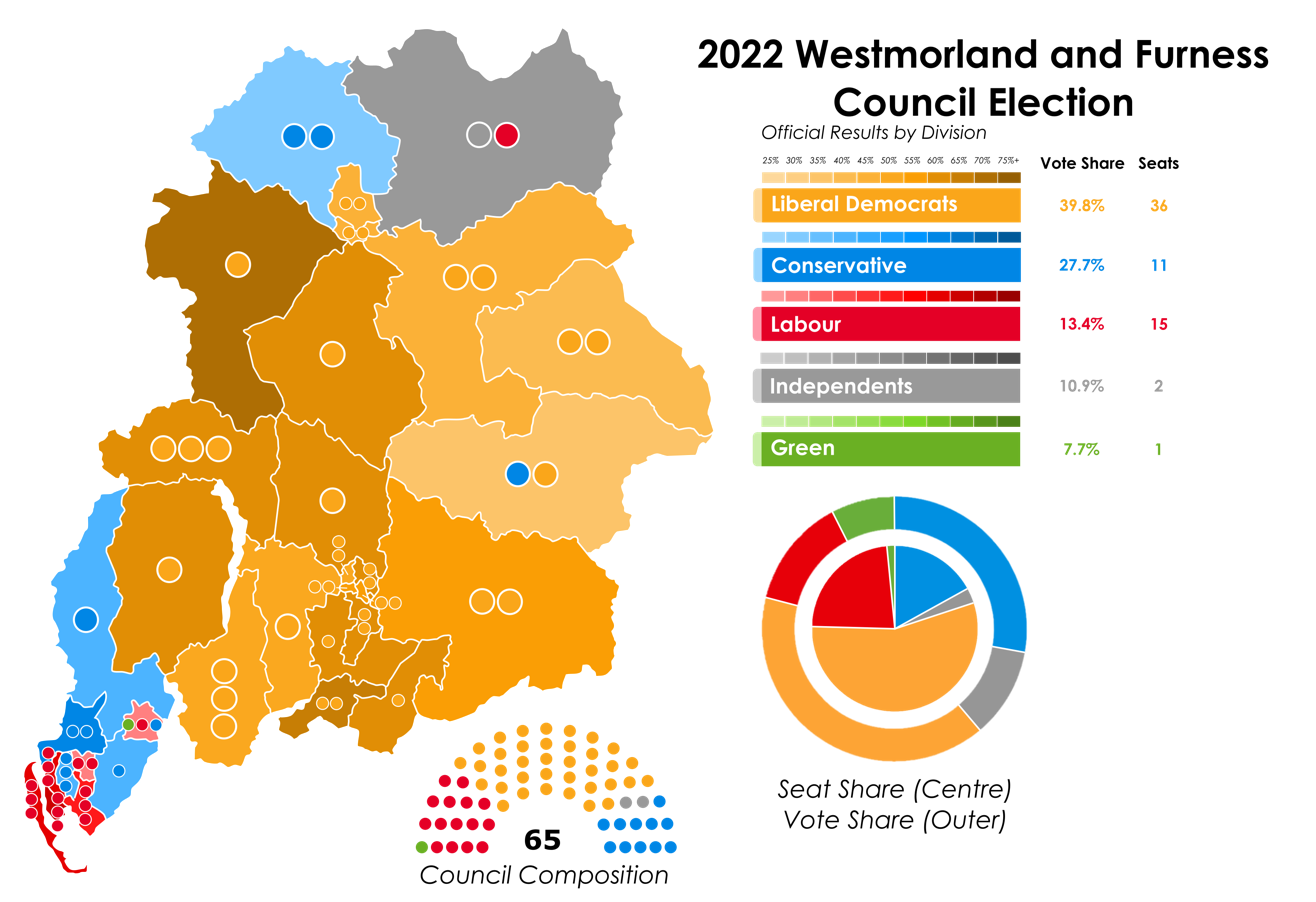
- 2022 Westmorland and Furness Council election.
Council control after election
Liberal Democrats

The 2022 Westmorland and Furness Council election was held on 5 May 2022 to elect members of Westmorland and Furness Council in England. The council area consists of the area covered by the districts of Barrow-in-Furness, Eden and South Lakeland.

These were the first elections to the new authority, with the council acting as a 'shadow authority' until the abolition of the three former districts and Cumbria County Council on 1 April 2023.

== Background ==
The combined composition of the three merging district councils going into that election was as follows:

Affiliation	Members
Liberal Democrats	44
Conservative	35
Labour	28
Independent / Other	14
Green	3
Vacant	1

== Results ==
The Liberal Democrats secured a majority on the incoming council, winning 36 of the 65 seats. Labour won 15 seats, the Conservatives won 11, two independent candidates were elected and the Green Party won one.

2022 Westmorland and Furness Election
Party	Councillors				Votes		
Party		Of total	Net			Of total	Net
Liberal Democrats	36	55.4%		36 / 65	29,960	39.8%	
Labour Party	15	23.1%		15 / 65	10,132	13.4%	
Conservative Party	11	16.9%		11 / 65	20,841	27.7%	
Independents	2	3.1%		2 / 65	8,238	10.9%	
Green Party	1	1.5%		1 / 65	5,839	7.7%	
TUSC	0	0.0%		0 / 65	335	0.4%	

== Ward results (Barrow-in-Furness) ==
Party	Councillors				Votes		
Party		Of total	Net			Of total	Net
Labour Party	13	68.4%		13 / 19	6,944	46.5%	
Conservative Party	5	26.3%		5 / 19	5,342	35.8%	
Independents	1	5.3%		1 / 19	1,686	11.3%	
Liberal Democrats	0	0.0%		0 / 19	950	6.4%	

=== Dalton North ===
Dalton North (2)
Party	Candidate	Votes	%	±%
Conservative	Ben Shirley	921	60.6	N/A
Conservative	Daniel Edwards	783	51.5	N/A
Labour	Robert Elliot	556	36.6	N/A
Liberal Democrats	Rachael Hogg	262	17.2	N/A
Liberal Democrats	Stephen Coleman	143	9.4	N/A
Majority				
Turnout		1,520	32.01	
Conservative win (new seat)				
Conservative win (new seat)				

=== Dalton South ===
Dalton South (2)
Party	Candidate	Votes	%	±%
Independent	Dave Taylor	585	38.4	N/A
Labour	Tony Callister	488	32.0	N/A
Labour	Steve Nott	483	31.7	N/A
Conservative	Sam Ronson	469	30.8	N/A
Conservative	Des English	432	28.4	N/A
Independent	Martin McLeavy	268	17.6	N/A
Liberal Democrats	Barbara Miller	74	4.9	N/A
Liberal Democrats	Peter Baker	64	4.2	N/A
Majority				
Turnout		1,523	32.99	
Independent win (new seat)				
Labour win (new seat)				

=== Hawcoat & Newbarns ===
Hawcoat & Newbarns (3)
Party	Candidate	Votes	%	±%
Conservative	Les Hall	1,151	41.9	N/A
Conservative	Niyall Phillips	1,069	38.9	N/A
Conservative	Roy Worthington	993	36.1	N/A
Labour	David Cassidy	974	35.4	N/A
Labour	Mike Leach	913	33.2	N/A
Labour	Hayley Preston	891	32.4	N/A
Independent	Denise Edwards	558	20.3	N/A
Independent	Steven Pryer	468	17.0	N/A
Independent	Wendy McClure	416	15.1	N/A
Liberal Democrats	David Opie	160	5.8	N/A
Liberal Democrats	Sheila Eccles	123	4.5	N/A
Liberal Democrats	Christine Herbert	100	3.6	N/A
Majority				
Turnout		2,750	31.44	
Conservative win (new seat)				
Conservative win (new seat)				
Conservative win (new seat)				

=== Old Barrow & Hindpool ===
Old Barrow & Hindpool (3)
Party	Candidate	Votes	%	±%
Labour	Anne Burns	1,183	66.6	N/A
Labour	Kevin Hamilton	1,089	61.4	N/A
Labour	Margaret Thomson	1,076	60.6	N/A
Conservative	Anne Bispham	501	28.2	N/A
Conservative	Piya Das	407	22.9	N/A
Conservative	Brenda Lauderdale	406	22.9	N/A
Liberal Democrats	Adam Campbell	114	6.4	N/A
Liberal Democrats	Gill Gardiner	99	5.6	N/A
Liberal Democrats	Stephen Pickthall	83	4.7	N/A
Majority				
Turnout		1,775	21.10	
Labour win (new seat)				
Labour win (new seat)				
Labour win (new seat)				

=== Ormsgill & Parkside ===
Ormsgill & Parkside (3)
Party	Candidate	Votes	%	±%
Labour	Bill McEwan	1,242	61.5	N/A
Labour	Derek Brook	1,211	60.0	N/A
Labour	Beverly Morgan	1,177	58.3	N/A
Conservative	Elaine Burley	635	31.5	N/A
Conservative	Anne English	575	28.5	N/A
Conservative	Emma Wylie	527	26.1	N/A
Liberal Democrats	Jayne Richardson	114	5.6	N/A
Liberal Democrats	Phil Walker	84	4.2	N/A
Liberal Democrats	Alasdair Wilkinson-Marsh	68	3.4	N/A
Majority				
Turnout		2,019	24.68	
Labour win (new seat)				
Labour win (new seat)				
Labour win (new seat)				

=== Risedale & Roosecote ===
Risedale & Roosecote (3)
Party	Candidate	Votes	%	±%
Labour	Jane Murphy	1,152	49.6	N/A
Labour	Andy Coles	1,139	49.1	N/A
Labour	Trevor Biggins	1,130	48.7	N/A
Conservative	Derek Gawne	984	42.4	N/A
Conservative	Lynda Shaw	947	40.8	N/A
Conservative	Ronnie Haddow	871	37.5	N/A
Liberal Democrats	Michael Barwise	145	6.2	N/A
Liberal Democrats	Jade Sullivan	128	5.5	N/A
Liberal Democrats	Heather Troughton	121	5.2	N/A
Majority				
Turnout		2,321	28.20	
Labour win (new seat)				
Labour win (new seat)				
Labour win (new seat)				

=== Walney Island ===
Walney Island (3)
Party	Candidate	Votes	%	±%
Labour	Frank Cassidy	1,349	61.4	N/A
Labour	Anita Husband	1,179	53.7	N/A
Labour	Therese Assouad	1,175	53.5	N/A
Conservative	Paul Rose	681	31.0	N/A
Conservative	Steve Sharpe	638	29.1	N/A
Conservative	Terri-Ann Gibney	622	28.3	N/A
Independent	Steven Fletcher	275	12.5	N/A
Liberal Democrats	Paul Trollope	81	3.7	N/A
Liberal Democrats	Chris Hogg	77	3.5	N/A
Liberal Democrats	Tina Perkins	59	2.7	N/A
Majority				
Turnout		2,196	26.73	
Labour win (new seat)				
Labour win (new seat)				
Labour win (new seat)				

== Ward results (Eden) ==
Party	Councillors				Votes		
Party		Of total	Net			Of total	Net
Liberal Democrats	11	68.8%		11 / 16	7,898	39.7%	
Conservative Party	3	18.8%		3 / 16	5,096	25.6%	
Independents	1	6.3%		1 / 16	5,124	25.8%	
Labour Party	1	6.3%		1 / 16	824	4.1%	
Green Party	0	0.0%		0 / 16	931	4.7%	

=== Alston & Fellside ===
Alston & Fellside (2)
Party	Candidate	Votes	%	±%
Independent	Mary Robinson	984	45.9	N/A
Labour	Michael Hanley	824	38.4	N/A
Labour	Ian Lindley	572	26.7	N/A
Conservative	Michael Beveridge	425	19.8	N/A
Conservative	Dale Normington	403	18.8	N/A
Liberal Democrats	Andy Baker	402	18.7	N/A
Liberal Democrats	Richard Sanderson	147	6.9	N/A
Majority				
Turnout		2,145	41.31	
Independent win (new seat)				
Labour win (new seat)				

=== Appleby & Brough ===
Appleby & Brough (2)
Party	Candidate	Votes	%	±%
Liberal Democrats	Andy Connell	986	51.8	N/A
Liberal Democrats	Graham Simpkins	631	33.2	N/A
Independent	Gareth Hayes	609	32.0	N/A
Independent	William Patterson	511	26.9	N/A
Conservative	Colin Smith	451	23.7	N/A
Conservative	Harry Berkeley	363	19.1	N/A
Majority				
Turnout		1,902	40.23	
Liberal Democrats win (new seat)				
Liberal Democrats win (new seat)				

=== Eamont & Shap ===
Eamont & Shap (1)
Party	Candidate	Votes	%	±%
Liberal Democrats	Neil Hughes	1,031	65.7	N/A
Conservative	Tom Lowther	539	34.3	N/A
Majority		492	31.4	
Turnout		1,570	45.55	
Liberal Democrats win (new seat)				

=== Eden & Lyvennet Vale ===
Eden & Lyvennet Vale (2)
Party	Candidate	Votes	%	±%
Liberal Democrats	Lorna Baker	960	51.0	N/A
Liberal Democrats	Neil McCall	816	43.3	N/A
Conservative	Paula Breen	630	33.4	N/A
Conservative	David Whipp	585	31.1	N/A
Independent	Mike Tonkin	466	24.7	N/A
Majority				
Turnout		1,884	42.03	
Liberal Democrats win (new seat)				
Liberal Democrats win (new seat)				

=== Greystoke & Ullswater ===
Greystoke & Ullswater (1)
Party	Candidate	Votes	%	±%
Liberal Democrats	Judith Derbyshire	1,150	70.8	N/A
Conservative	Debbie Wicks	475	29.2	N/A
Majority		675	41.6	
Turnout		1,625	47.66	
Liberal Democrats win (new seat)				

=== Hesket & Lazonby ===
Hesket & Lazonby (2)
Party	Candidate	Votes	%	±%
Conservative	Colin Atkinson	676	33.4	N/A
Conservative	Hilary Carrick	658	32.5	N/A
Independent	Elaine Martin	599	29.6	N/A
Independent	David Ryland	530	26.2	N/A
Liberal Democrats	Roger Burgin	484	23.9	N/A
Liberal Democrats	David Evans	229	11.3	N/A
Green	Belinda Lloyd	44	2.2	N/A
Majority				
Turnout		2,023	40.93	
Conservative win (new seat)				
Conservative win (new seat)				

=== Kirkby Stephen & Tebay ===
Kirkby Stephen & Tebay (2)
Party	Candidate	Votes	%	±%
Conservative	Phil Dew	861	51.5	N/A
Liberal Democrats	John Murray	697	41.7	N/A
Liberal Democrats	Adrian Waite	557	33.3	N/A
Independent	Sandy Lancaster	496	29.7	N/A
Conservative	Ray Briggs	266	15.9	N/A
Majority				
Turnout		1,672	41.90	
Conservative win (new seat)				
Liberal Democrats win (new seat)				

=== Penrith North ===
Penrith North (2)
Party	Candidate	Votes	%	±%
Liberal Democrats	Patricia Bell	1,277	58.6	N/A
Liberal Democrats	Mark Rudhall	820	37.6	N/A
Green	Ali Ross	675	31.0	N/A
Conservative	Helen Fearon	519	23.8	N/A
Conservative	Harry Fearon	444	20.4	N/A
Green	Wade Tilbury	266	12.2	N/A
Independent	Scott Jackson	138	6.3	N/A
Independent	Peter Devine	122	5.6	N/A
Majority				
Turnout		2,178	37.84	
Liberal Democrats win (new seat)				
Liberal Democrats win (new seat)				

=== Penrith South ===
Penrith South (2)
Party	Candidate	Votes	%	±%
Liberal Democrats	Virginia Taylor	911	45.5	N/A
Liberal Democrats	Mike Eyles	899	44.9	N/A
Conservative	Gillian Barnes	520	26.0	N/A
Conservative	Matt Vickers	459	22.9	N/A
Independent	Lee Quinn	397	19.8	N/A
Independent	Margaret Clark	272	13.6	N/A
Green	Richard O'Brien	212	10.6	N/A
Majority				
Turnout		2,001	28.55	
Liberal Democrats win (new seat)				
Liberal Democrats win (new seat)				

== Ward results (South Lakeland) ==
Party	Councillors				Votes		
Party		Of total	Net			Of total	Net
Liberal Democrats	25	83.3%		25 / 30	21,112	52.1%	
Conservative Party	3	10.0%		3 / 30	10,403	25.7%	
Green Party	1	3.3%		1 / 30	4,908	12.1%	
Labour Party	1	3.3%		1 / 30	2,364	5.8%	
Independents	0	0.0%		0 / 30	1,428	3.5%	
TUSC	0	0.0%		0 / 30	335	0.8%	

=== Bowness & Lyth ===
Bowness & Lyth (1)
Party	Candidate	Votes	%	±%
Liberal Democrats	Steve Bavin	747	53.1	N/A
Conservative	Jim Bland	584	41.5	N/A
Green	Simon Clayton	75	5.3	N/A
Majority		163	11.6	
Turnout		1,406	48.34	
Liberal Democrats win (new seat)				

=== Burton & Holme ===
Burton & Holme (1)
Party	Candidate	Votes	%	±%
Liberal Democrats	Vicky Hughes	891	60.7	N/A
Conservative	Tom Harvey	519	35.4	N/A
Green	Simon Blunden	58	4.0	N/A
Majority		372	25.3	
Turnout		1,468	52.57	
Liberal Democrats win (new seat)				

=== Coniston & Hawkshead ===
Coniston & Hawkshead (1)
Party	Candidate	Votes	%	±%
Liberal Democrats	Suzanne Pender	854	63.9	N/A
Conservative	Michael Hoad	370	27.7	N/A
Labour	Paul Andrew Martin	60	4.5	N/A
Green	Mark Poole	53	4.0	N/A
Majority		484	36.2	
Turnout		1.337	50.93	
Liberal Democrats win (new seat)				

=== Grange & Cartmel ===
Grange & Cartmel (3)
Party	Candidate	Votes	%	±%
Liberal Democrats	Jenny Boak	2,588	59.3	N/A
Liberal Democrats	Pete Endsor	2,486	56.9	N/A
Liberal Democrats	Sue Sanderson	2,040	46.7	N/A
Independent	Fiona Hanlon	1,428	32.7	N/A
Conservative	Tor McLaren	1,050	24.0	N/A
Conservative	James Townley	882	20.2	N/A
Conservative	David Wilson	729	16.7	N/A
Green	Mandy Barnett	301	6.9	N/A
Green	Paul Woods	177	4.1	N/A
Green	Luke Mossbarnett	137	3.1	N/A
TUSC	Lilian El-Doufani	105	2.4	N/A
Majority				
Turnout		4,367	49.85	
Liberal Democrats win (new seat)				
Liberal Democrats win (new seat)				
Liberal Democrats win (new seat)				

=== High Furness ===
High Furness (1)
Party	Candidate	Votes	%	±%
Conservative	Matt Brereton	581	41.4	N/A
Liberal Democrats	Ian Wharton	562	40.0	N/A
Labour	Stephen Carter	164	11.7	N/A
Green	Peter Howlett	97	6.9	N/A
Majority		19	1.4	
Turnout		1,404	45.97	
Conservative win (new seat)				

=== Kendal Castle ===
Kendal Castle (2)
Party	Candidate	Votes	%	±%
Liberal Democrats	Eamonn Hennessy	1,224	59.8	N/A
Liberal Democrats	Helen Ladhams	1,212	59.2	N/A
Conservative	Nigel Byrom	430	21.0	N/A
Conservative	David Williams	404	19.7	N/A
Green	Claire Wickham	207	10.1	N/A
Green	Janet Antrobus	198	9.7	N/A
Labour	Penny Henderson	134	6.5	N/A
Majority				
Turnout		2,048	42.74	
Liberal Democrats win (new seat)				
Liberal Democrats win (new seat)				

=== Kendal Highgate ===
Kendal Highgate (2)
Party	Candidate	Votes	%	±%
Liberal Democrats	Phil Dixon	1,111	62.5	N/A
Liberal Democrats	Matt Severn	942	53.0	N/A
Conservative	Margaret Bond	279	15.7	N/A
Conservative	Mike Nicholson	264	14.8	N/A
Green	Rosie Naish	256	14.4	N/A
Green	Ian Rodham	179	10.1	N/A
Labour	Oliver Gill	160	9.0	N/A
TUSC	Trevor Batchelor	122	6.9	N/A
Majority				
Turnout		1,778	38.13	
Liberal Democrats win (new seat)				
Liberal Democrats win (new seat)				

=== Kendal Nether ===
Kendal Nether (2)
Party	Candidate	Votes	%	±%
Liberal Democrats	Shirley Evans	1,192	62.6	N/A
Liberal Democrats	Jonathan Cornthwaite	1,166	61.2	N/A
Conservative	Lyndsay Slater	333	17.5	N/A
Conservative	Raymond Bower	271	14.2	N/A
Green	Liz Wood	199	10.5	N/A
Labour	Paul Braithwaite	182	9.6	N/A
Green	Daniel Rayson	154	8.1	N/A
TUSC	Paul Casson	61	3.2	N/A
Majority				
Turnout		1,904	37.99	
Liberal Democrats win (new seat)				
Liberal Democrats win (new seat)				

=== Kendal South ===
Kendal South (2)
Party	Candidate	Votes	%	±%
Liberal Democrats	Jonathan Brook	1,547	64.9	N/A
Liberal Democrats	Doug Rathbone	1,540	64.6	N/A
Conservative	Luke Gudgeon	564	23.7	N/A
Conservative	Sheila Worthington	421	17.7	N/A
Green	Elsa Fuster	177	7.4	N/A
Labour	Lois Sparling	135	5.7	N/A
Green	Phil Whiting	109	4.6	N/A
Majority				
Turnout		2,383	48.33	
Liberal Democrats win (new seat)				
Liberal Democrats win (new seat)				

=== Kendal Strickland & Fell ===
Kendal Strickland & Fell (2)
Party	Candidate	Votes	%	±%
Liberal Democrats	Giles Archibald	1,381	56.4	N/A
Liberal Democrats	Peter Thornton	1,225	50.0	N/A
Green	Laura Miller	749	30.6	N/A
Green	Graham Vincent	576	23.5	N/A
Labour	Virginia Branney	243	9.9	N/A
Conservative	Irene Asbury	221	9.0	N/A
Conservative	Jacqueline Scott	215	8.8	N/A
TUSC	Martin Powell-Davies	47	1.9	N/A
Majority				
Turnout		2,448	49.44	
Liberal Democrats win (new seat)				
Liberal Democrats win (new seat)				

=== Kent Estuary ===
Kent Estuary (2)
Party	Candidate	Votes	%	±%
Liberal Democrats	Helen Chaffey	1,767	67.8	N/A
Liberal Democrats	Rupert Audland	1,621	62.2	N/A
Conservative	Margaret Handley	654	25.1	N/A
Conservative	Peter Smillie	526	20.2	N/A
Green	Jill Abel	337	12.9	N/A
Majority				
Turnout			52.15	
Liberal Democrats win (new seat)				
Liberal Democrats win (new seat)				

=== Levens & Crooklands ===
Levens & Crooklands (1)
Party	Candidate	Votes	%	±%
Liberal Democrats	Janet Battye	1,106	64.4	N/A
Conservative	Kevin Holmes	539	31.4	N/A
Green	Hilary Pickup	73	4.2	N/A
Majority		567	33.0	
Turnout		1,718	54.66	
Liberal Democrats win (new seat)				

=== Low Furness ===
Low Furness (1)
Party	Candidate	Votes	%	±%
Conservative	Ben Cooper	650	44.5	N/A
Liberal Democrats	Janet Willis	627	42.9	N/A
Labour	Eirik Hunt	128	8.8	N/A
Green	Paul Rigg	56	3.8	N/A
Majority		23	1.6	
Turnout		1,461	43.91	
Conservative win (new seat)				

=== Sedbergh & Kirkby Lonsdale ===
Sedbergh & Kirkby Lonsdale (2)
Party	Candidate	Votes	%	±%
Liberal Democrats	Ian Mitchell	1,891	60.2	N/A
Liberal Democrats	Hazel Hodgson	1,854	59.1	N/A
Conservative	Kevin Lancaster	983	31.3	N/A
Conservative	Pat Bell	898	28.6	N/A
Green	Tony Gray	225	7.2	N/A
Majority				
Turnout		3,139	51.81	
Liberal Democrats win (new seat)				
Liberal Democrats win (new seat)				

=== Ulverston ===
Ulverston (3)
Party	Candidate	Votes	%	±%
Green	Judy Filmore	1,445	36.4	N/A
Labour	Jackie Drake	1,286	32.4	N/A
Conservative	Helen Irving	1,265	31.8	N/A
Labour	Michelle Scrogham	1,247	31.4	N/A
Conservative	Andrew Butcher	1,218	30.7	N/A
Labour	Mark Wilson	1,189	29.9	N/A
Conservative	Amanda Rigg	1,165	29.3	N/A
Green	Bob Gerry	930	23.4	N/A
Green	Rob O'Hara	864	21.8	N/A
Liberal Democrats	Andrew Hudson	345	8.7	N/A
Liberal Democrats	Dave Rushton	246	6.2	N/A
Liberal Democrats	Charles Howarth	209	5.3	N/A
Majority				
Turnout		3,972	42.76	
Green win (new seat)				
Labour win (new seat)				
Conservative win (new seat)				

=== Upper Kent ===
Upper Kent (1)
Party	Candidate	Votes	%	±%
Liberal Democrats	Ali Jama	949	60.3	N/A
Conservative	Deborah Huck	415	26.4	N/A
Green	Fran Richardson	210	13.3	N/A
Majority		534	33.9	
Turnout		1,574	47.44	
Liberal Democrats win (new seat)				

=== Windermere & Ambleside ===
Windermere & Ambleside (3)
Party	Candidate	Votes	%	±%
Liberal Democrats	Will Clark	2,330	67.1	N/A
Liberal Democrats	Andrew Jarvis	2,231	64.3	N/A
Liberal Democrats	Dyan Jones	2,183	62.9	N/A
Conservative	Cath Musetti	966	27.8	N/A
Conservative	Jolyon Stephenson	774	22.3	N/A
Conservative	Paula Cross	751	21.6	N/A
Green	Kate Threadgold	390	11.2	N/A
Majority				
Turnout		3,471	45.52	
Liberal Democrats win (new seat)				
Liberal Democrats win (new seat)				
Liberal Democrats win (new seat)				

== Changes 2022–2027 ==
In March 2025, Liberal Democrat councillor Ali Jama left the party to sit as an independent. Liberal Democrat councillor Michael Eyles also left the party to sit as an independent in April 2026.

=== Old Barrow and Hindpool ===
Old Barrow and Hindpool: 4 May 2023
Party	Candidate	Votes	%	±%
Labour	Dave Cassidy	1,004	69.4	+8.8
Conservative	Derek Gawne	354	24.5	−3.7
Liberal Democrats	Stephen Pickthall	89	6.2	+1.5
Majority		650	44.9	+12.5
Turnout		1,447	17.77	−3.33
Labour hold		Swing	+6.3	

The by-election followed the death of Labour councillor Ann Thomson in January 2023.

=== Grange & Cartmel ===
Grange & Cartmel: 2 May 2024
Party	Candidate	Votes	%	±%
Liberal Democrats	Andy Hull	2,852	77.2	+20.3
Conservative	Ally Hibbert	691	18.7	−5.3
TUSC	Martin Powell-Davies	151	4.2	+1.8
Majority		2,161	58.5	+25.6
Turnout		3,715	43.01	−6.84
Rejected ballots		21		
Liberal Democrats hold		Swing	+12.8	

The seat had been vacated by Liberal Democrat councillor Pete Endsor in March 2024.

=== Grange & Cartmel ===
Grange & Cartmel: 17 October 2024
Party	Candidate	Votes	%	±%
Liberal Democrats	Tim Bloomer	2,180	84.8	+38.1
Conservative	Tor McLaren	392	15.2	−8.8
Majority		1,788	69.6	+46.9
Turnout		2,589	29.82	−20.03
Rejected ballots		17		
Liberal Democrats hold		Swing	+23.4	

The by-election followed the retirement of Liberal Democrat councillor Sue Sanderson.

=== Kirkby Stephen and Tebay ===
Kirkby Stephen and Tebay: 31 October 2024
Party	Candidate	Votes	%	±%
Liberal Democrats	Adrian Waite	887	82.7	+49.4
Conservative	Pat Bell	186	17.3	−34.2
Majority		701	65.4	+47.2
Turnout		1,080	26.17	−15.73
Rejected ballots		7		
Liberal Democrats gain from Conservative		Swing	+41.8	

The by-election followed the retirement of Conservative councillor Phil Dew.

=== Eamont & Shap ===
Eamont & Shap by-election: 27 February 2025
Party	Candidate	Votes	%	±%
Liberal Democrats	Nicki Vecqueray	789	67.2	+1.5
Conservative	Hector Meanwell	241	20.5	–13.8
Putting Cumbria First	Jonathan Davies	76	6.5	N/A
Green	Pamela Pottinger	68	5.8	N/A
Majority		548	46.7	+15.3
Turnout		1,174	34.07	–11.5
Rejected ballots		0		
Liberal Democrats hold		Swing	▲7.7	

The by-election followed the retirement of Liberal Democrat councillor Neil Hughes at the end of December 2024.

=== Penrith South ===
Penrith South by-election: 12 March 2026
Party	Candidate	Votes	%	±%
Liberal Democrats	Barbara Jayson	749	43.2	−2.3
Reform	Michael John Houston	588	33.9	N/A
Green	Emilia Louise Hoffman	225	13.0	+2.4
Conservative	Maiki Tolmie	173	10.0	−16.0
Majority		161	9.3	−10.2
Turnout		1,739	23.51	−5.04
Rejected ballots		4		
Liberal Democrats hold				

The by-election followed the retirement of Liberal Democrat councillor Virginia Taylor.

=== Hawcoat & Newbarns ===
Hawcoat & Newbarns by-election: 4 June 2026
Party	Candidate	Votes	%	±%
Reform	Hazel Edwards	1,139	48.4	N/A
Labour	Mike Leach	576	24.5	−8.7
Conservative	Marco Fawcett	447	19.0	−19.9
Green	Rebekah Atkinson	121	5.1	N/A
Liberal Democrats	Stephen Pickthall	69	2.9	−2.9
Majority		563	23.9	+18.2
Turnout		2,359	27.16	−4.28
Rejected ballots		7		
Reform gain from Conservative				

The by-election followed the resignation of Conservative councillor Niyall Phillips.

== See also ==
- Westmorland and Furness Council elections
