= 50:50 Parliament =

50:50 Parliament is a cross-party campaign to achieve gender equality in the House of Commons (UK). Female representation stood at 32% as of the 2017 General Election. To mark International Women's Day 2018, MPs including the Prime Minister and the Leader of the Opposition, wore 50:50 badges at Prime Minister's Question time. The campaign was founded by Frances Scott in 2013. 50:50 is a registered charity.

The campaign includes the #AskHerToStand campaign.
