= Morecambe and Lunesdale =

UK Parliament constituency (since 1983)

Coordinates: 54.089°N 2.824°W

- County constituency for the House of Commons
- Interactive map of boundaries since 2024
- Location within North West England
- County: Lancashire, Cumbria
- Electorate: 76,040 (March 2020)
- Major settlements: Morecambe, Heysham, Carnforth, Sedbergh and Arnside

Current constituency
- Created: 1950
- Member of Parliament: Lizzi Collinge (Labour)
- Seats: One
- Created from: Lonsdale

Morecambe and Lunesdale is a constituency (Note: A county constituency (for the purposes of election expenses and type of returning officer)) represented in the House of Commons of the UK Parliament since the 2024 general election by Lizzi Collinge for Labour. (Note: As with all constituencies, the constituency elects one Member of Parliament (MP) by the first past the post system of election at least every five years.)

== Constituency profile ==
Morecambe and Lunesdale is a constituency in North West England, covering parts of Lancashire and Cumbria. It is named after its largest town, Morecambe, which has a population of around 33,000, and the rural river valley of Lunesdale (or Lonsdale) to the town's northeast. Other settlements in the constituency include the large coastal village of Heysham, which is contiguous with Morecambe, the small towns of Carnforth, Kirkby Lonsdale and Sedbergh and the villages of Slyne-with-Hest and Bolton-le-Sands.

Morecambe is a seaside resort town developed during the Victorian era. Like many coastal towns in England, its economy suffered in the late 20th century with the decline in tourism, and today the town is highly-deprived. Heysham is the site of two nuclear power stations and a large ferry and freight port with services to the Isle of Man and Ireland. The rural Lunesdale area is affluent and contains many historic small towns and villages. This area is popular with tourists due to its location adjacent to the Yorkshire Dales and Lake District National Parks. House prices across the constituency are generally similar to the rest of North West England and lower than the national average.

A large proportion of the constituency's residents are retired. In general, residents have average levels of education, are more likely to be religious, and have high rates of homeownership compared to the rest of the country. Rates of household income and child poverty are in line with national averages. A high proportion of residents work in the tourism, agriculture and construction sectors, and a low percentage claim unemployment benefits. White people made up 98% of the population at the 2021 census.

At the local district council level, Morecambe and Carnforth are mostly represented by the Labour Party, Slyne-with-Hest and Bolton-le-Sands by Conservatives and the rural areas by Liberal Democrat and Green Party councillors. At Lancashire County Council, which held elections in 2025, all seats in the constituency elected Reform UK representatives. An estimated 54% of voters in Morecambe and Lunesdale supported leaving the European Union in the 2016 referendum, similar to the nationwide figure of 52%.

== Boundaries ==
=== Historic ===
==== 1983–2010 ====
Map of boundaries 2010-2024

Before 1950, Morecambe was in the Lancaster constituency. This seat was formerly Morecambe and Lonsdale and gained a new name and redrawn boundaries in 1983. For the general election of that year, sections of the constituency were removed to be united with the former county of Westmorland in the Westmorland and Lonsdale constituency. For the 1983 election the City of Lancaster electoral wards used in the creation of the new seat were:

- Alexandra, Arkholme, Bolton-le-Sands, Carnforth, Halton-with-Aughton, Harbour, Heysham Central, Heysham North, Kellet, Overton, Parks, Poulton, Silverdale, Slyne-with-Hest, Torrisholme, Victoria and Walton

==== 2010–2024 ====
In boundary changes which came into effect for the 2010 election, only minor adjustments were made. Parliament approved the recommendations in the Boundary Commission's Fifth Periodic Review of Westminster constituencies in respect of this area, enacting only minor boundary alterations. The constituency had City of Lancaster electoral wards:

- Bolton-le-Sands, Carnforth, Halton-with-Aughton, Harbour, Heysham Central, Heysham North, Heysham South, Kellet, Overton, Poulton, Silverdale, Skerton East, Skerton West, Slyne-with-Hest, Torrisholme, Upper Lune Valley, Warton and Westgate.

=== Current ===
Further to the 2023 review of Westminster constituencies, the composition of the constituency was defined as follows (as they existed on 1 December 2020):

City of Lancaster wards:

- Bare
- Bolton & Slyne
- Carnforth & Millhead
- Halton-with-Aughton
- Harbour (Morecambe)
- Heysham Central
- Heysham North
- Heysham South
- Kellet
- Lower Lune Valley
- Overton
- Poulton (Morecambe)
- Silverdale
- Torrisholme
- Upper Lune Valley
- Warton
- Westgate (Morecambe)

Wards of the former South Lakeland district, now in Westmorland and Furness:

- Arnside & Milnthorpe
- Burton & Crooklands
- Sedbergh & Kirkby Lonsdale

The three South Lakeland wards were transferred from Westmorland and Lonsdale, partly offset by the community of Skerton going to the re-established seat of Lancaster and Wyre.

With effect from 1 April 2023, the District of South Lakeland was abolished and absorbed into the new unitary authority of Westmorland and Furness. Also a local government boundary review was carried out in the City of Lancaster which came into effect in May 2023. Accordingly, the constituency now comprises the following from the 2024 general election:

City of Lancaster wards:

- Bare
- Bolton & Slyne
- Carnforth & Millhead
- Halton-with-Aughton & Kellet
- Heysham Central
- Heysham North
- Heysham South
- Lower Lune Valley
- Overton
- Poulton
- Silverdale
- Skerton (small part)
- Torrisholme
- Upper Lune Valley
- Warton
- West End
- Westgate

Westmorland and Furness wards:

- Burton and Holme
- Kendal South (part)
- Kent Estuary
- Levens and Crooklands (part)
- Sedbergh and Kirkby Lonsdale (majority)

The revised constituency is made up of parts of: the previous Morecambe and Lunesdale constituency (35.1% by area and 76.3% by population of the new seat); Westmorland and Lonsdale, which still exists with revised boundaries (46.5% by area and 18.9% by population); and the former Lancaster and Fleetwood (18.4% by area and 4.8% by population).

== History ==
Since its creation in 1983, the Morecambe and Lunesdale can be regarded as a bellwether seat, changing hands with a change of government. Once a safe Conservative area, Morecambe followed its neighbour and fellow seaside town, Blackpool, by voting Labour in the 1997 general election. The results in the general elections of 1997, 2001 and 2005 had remarkably similar majorities with virtually no swing to the Conservatives. The Conservatives gained the seat at the 2010 general election with an above average swing, and held it in 2015, 2017 and 2019. The notional 2019 result for the area, using the 2024 boundaries, was Conservative. In the 2024 general election the seat was won by Labour.

== Members of Parliament ==
Election	Member	Party
1950	constituency created as "Morecambe and Lonsdale"	
1950	Ian Fraser	Conservative
1958 by-election	Basil de Ferranti	Conservative
1964	Alfred Hall-Davis	Conservative
1979	Mark Lennox-Boyd	Conservative
1983	constituency renamed as "Morecambe and Lunesdale" after boundary changes	
1983	Mark Lennox-Boyd	Conservative
1997	Geraldine Smith	Labour
2010	David Morris	Conservative
2024	Lizzi Collinge	Labour

== Elections ==
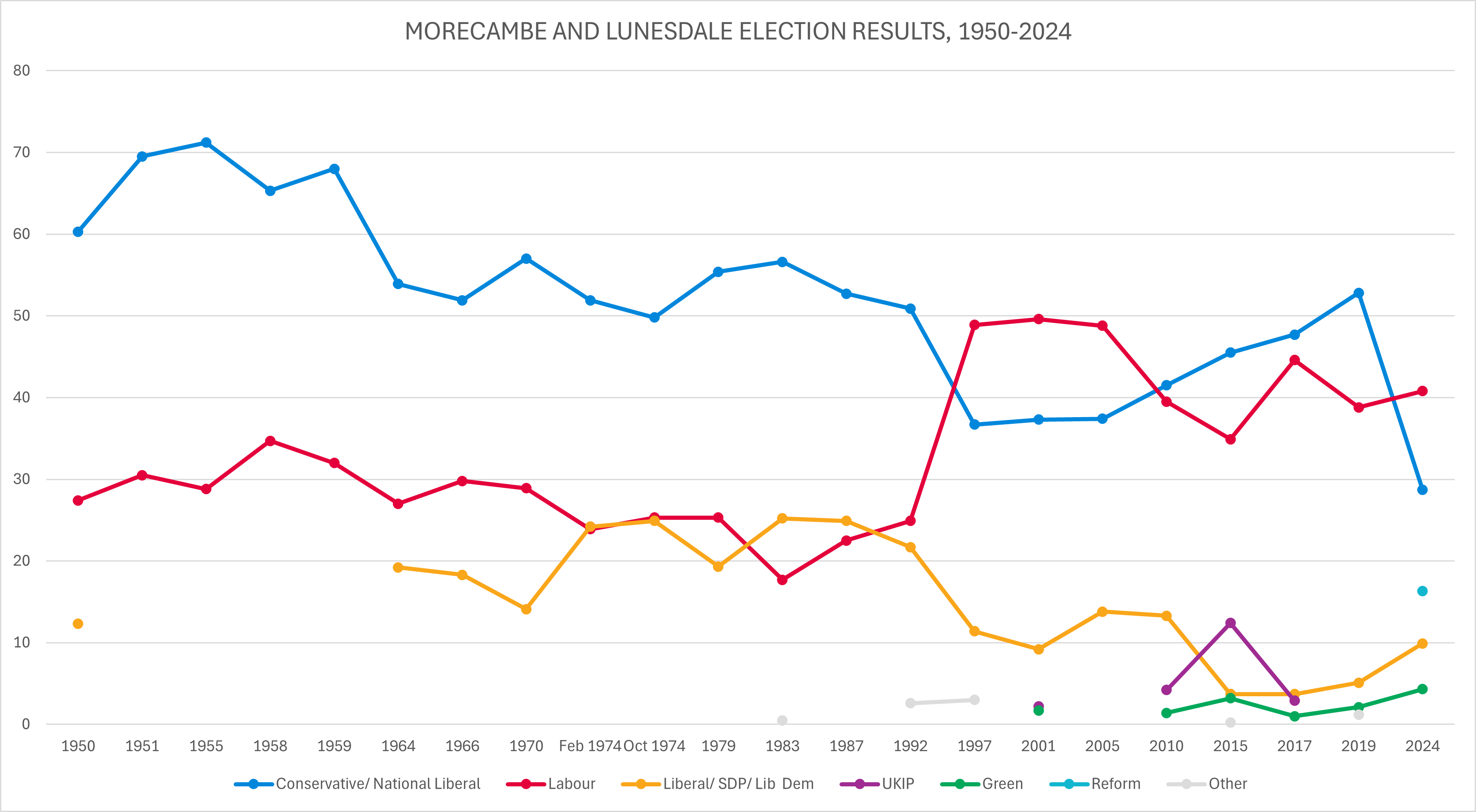
Election results 1950-2024

=== Elections in the 2020s ===
General election 2024: Morecambe and Lunesdale
Party	Candidate	Votes	%	±%
Labour	Lizzi Collinge	19,603	40.8	+12.7
Conservative	David Morris	13,788	28.7	−24.9
Reform	Barry Parsons	7,810	16.3	+15.9
Liberal Democrats	Peter Jackson	4,769	9.9	−5.7
Green	Gina Dowding	2,089	4.3	+3.0
Majority		5,815	12.1	N/A
Turnout		48,059	63.1	−4.1
Labour gain from Conservative		Swing	+18.8	

Changes are from the notional results of the 2019 election on new 2024 boundaries.

2019 notional result
Party	Vote	%
Conservative	29,834	53.6
Labour	15,646	28.1
Liberal Democrats	8,689	15.6
Green	704	1.3
Independent	548	1.0
Brexit Party	231	0.4
Majority	14,188	25.5
Turnout	55,652	73.9
Electorate	55,652	

=== Elections in the 2010s ===
General election 2019: Morecambe and Lunesdale
Party	Candidate	Votes	%	±%
Conservative	David Morris	23,925	52.8	+5.1
Labour	Lizzi Collinge	17,571	38.8	−5.8
Liberal Democrats	Owen Lambert	2,328	5.1	+1.4
Green	Chloe Buckley	938	2.1	+1.1
Independent	Darren Clifford	548	1.2	New
Majority		6,354	14.0	+10.9
Turnout		45,310	67.2	−1.1
Conservative hold		Swing	+5.5	

General election 2017: Morecambe and Lunesdale
Party	Candidate	Votes	%	±%
Conservative	David Morris	21,773	47.7	+2.2
Labour	Vikki Singleton	20,374	44.6	+9.7
Liberal Democrats	Matthew Severn	1,699	3.7	±0.0
UKIP	Robert Gillespie	1,333	2.9	−9.5
Green	Cait Sinclair	478	1.0	−2.2
Majority		1,399	3.1	−7.5
Turnout		45,657	68.3	+3.3
Conservative hold		Swing	−3.8	

General election 2015: Morecambe and Lunesdale
Party	Candidate	Votes	%	±%
Conservative	David Morris	19,691	45.5	+4.0
Labour	Amina Lone	15,101	34.9	−4.6
UKIP	Steven Ogden	5,358	12.4	+8.2
Liberal Democrats	Matthew Severn	1,612	3.7	−9.6
Green	Phil Chandler	1,395	3.2	+1.8
Independent	Michael Dawson	85	0.2	New
Majority		4,590	10.6	+8.6
Turnout		43,242	65.0	+2.9
Conservative hold		Swing	+4.3	

General election 2010: Morecambe and Lunesdale
Party	Candidate	Votes	%	±%
Conservative	David Morris	18,035	41.5	+4.2
Labour	Geraldine Smith	17,169	39.5	−9.5
Liberal Democrats	Les Jones	5,791	13.3	−0.3
UKIP	Nigel Brown	1,843	4.2	New
Green	Chris Coates	598	1.4	New
Majority		866	2.0	−9.5
Turnout		43,436	62.1	+0.7
Conservative gain from Labour		Swing	−6.9	

=== Elections in the 2000s ===
General election 2005: Morecambe and Lunesdale
Party	Candidate	Votes	%	±%
Labour	Geraldine Smith	20,331	48.8	−0.8
Conservative	James Airey	15,563	37.4	+0.1
Liberal Democrats	Alex Stone	5,741	13.8	+4.6
Majority		4,768	11.4	−0.9
Turnout		41,635	61.4	+0.3
Labour hold		Swing	−0.4	

General election 2001: Morecambe and Lunesdale
Party	Candidate	Votes	%	±%
Labour	Geraldine Smith	20,646	49.6	+0.7
Conservative	David Nuttall	15,554	37.3	+0.6
Liberal Democrats	Christopher Cotton	3,817	9.2	−2.2
UKIP	Greg Beaman	935	2.2	New
Green	Cherith Adams	703	1.7	New
Majority		5,092	12.3	+0.1
Turnout		41,655	61.1	−11.2
Labour hold		Swing	+0.65	

=== Elections in the 1990s ===
General election 1997: Morecambe and Lunesdale
Party	Candidate	Votes	%	±%
Labour	Geraldine Smith	24,061	48.9	
Conservative	Mark Lennox-Boyd	18,096	36.7	
Liberal Democrats	June Greenwell	5,614	11.4	
Referendum	Ian Ogilvie	1,313	2.7	New
Natural Law	David Walne	165	0.3	
Majority		5,965	12.2	N/A
Turnout		49,249	72.3	
Labour gain from Conservative		Swing	▲16.2	

General election 1992: Morecambe and Lunesdale
Party	Candidate	Votes	%	±%
Conservative	Mark Lennox-Boyd	22,507	50.9	−1.8
Labour	Jean Yates	10,998	24.9	+2.4
Liberal Democrats	Anthony Saville	9,584	21.7	−3.2
MB Independent	Mark Turner	916	2.1	New
Natural Law	Richard Marriott	205	0.5	New
Majority		11,509	26.0	−1.8
Turnout		44,210	78.3	+2.2
Conservative hold		Swing	−2.1	

=== Elections in the 1980s ===
General election 1987: Morecambe and Lunesdale
Party	Candidate	Votes	%	±%
Conservative	Mark Lennox-Boyd	22,327	52.7	−3.9
SDP	June Greenwell	10,542	24.9	−0.3
Labour	David Smith	9,535	22.5	+4.8
Majority		11,785	27.8	−3.6
Turnout		42,404	76.1	+3.2
Conservative hold		Swing		

General election 1983: Morecambe and Lunesdale
Party	Candidate	Votes	%	±%
Conservative	Mark Lennox-Boyd	21,968	56.6	
SDP	Tom Clare	9,774	25.2	
Labour	Abbott Bryning	6,882	17.7	
Independent	Irene Woods	208	0.5	
Majority		12,194	31.4	
Turnout		38,832	72.9	
Conservative win (new seat)				

== See also ==
- List of parliamentary constituencies in Cumbria
- List of parliamentary constituencies in Lancashire
