= Geraldine Smith (politician) =

British politician

Member of Parliament for Morecambe and Lunesdale
- In office 1 May 1997 – 12 April 2010
- Preceded by: Mark Lennox-Boyd
- Succeeded by: David Morris

Personal details
- Born: Maria Geraldine Smith; 29 August 1961 (age 65) Belfast, Northern Ireland
- Party: Labour

Maria Geraldine Smith (born 29 August 1961) is a former British Labour Party politician who was the Member of Parliament for Morecambe and Lunesdale from 1997 to 2010.

== Early life ==
She was educated at Morecambe High School and Lancaster and Morecambe College, where she gained a Diploma in Business Studies. Her first campaign was supported by the Communication Workers Union, for which she was formerly an officer. Prior to becoming taking office, she worked for the Royal Mail from 1980 to 1997, and was a member of Lancaster City Council.

== Parliamentary career ==
After the Labour Party's poor showing in the local government elections of 4 May 2006 she was linked to a campaign on a timetable for Tony Blair's departure as Prime Minister and also expressed a preference for Gordon Brown to succeed him. She also found "outrageous" the survival of John Prescott as a government minister following the reshuffle. She said that she believed William Hague would be the next Conservative Prime Minister, rather than David Cameron. In August 2009, she criticised the Human Fertilisation and Embryology Act 2008 which conferred legal parenthood on a biological mother's female partner, saying "To have a birth certificate with two mothers and no father is just madness." Smith was a member of the All-Party Parliamentary Flag Group.

On Wednesday 17 September 2008, Smith was interviewed by Tony Livesey on BBC Radio Lancashire's Breakfast Show; she attacked the so-called "Lancashire Mafia" for their plot against Prime Minister Gordon Brown, and accused those behind the scenes of being cowards.

Smith narrowly lost her seat to the Conservative David Morris in the general election in May 2010.

== Personal life ==
Geraldine Smith was the Patron of the Morecambe Bay National Osteoporosis Society Support Group until 2010.

Geraldine Smith was the President of 455 (Morecambe and Heysham) Squadron Air Training Corps until 2010 when she regretfully to its members stood down after a number of years as an ambassador to youth development in the area. The Air Training Corps is a youth organisation sponsored by the Royal Air Force for local youth between the ages of 13 and 18 giving them opportunities to learn new skills and support their local community.

Parliament of the United Kingdom
Preceded by Mark Lennox-Boyd	Member of Parliament for Morecambe and Lunesdale; 1997 – 2010	Succeeded by David Morris
