= Simon Lennox-Boyd, 2nd Viscount Boyd of Merton =

British peer (born 1939)

The Right Honourable The Viscount Boyd of Merton

Member of the House of Lords
- Lord Temporal
- as a hereditary peer 8 March 1983 – 11 November 1999
- Preceded by: The 1st Viscount Boyd of Merton
- Succeeded by: Seat abolished (Note: Under the House of Lords Act 1999.)

Personal details
- Born: Simon Donald Rupert Neville Lennox-Boyd; 7 December 1939 (age 85)
- Political party: Crossbench

Simon Donald Rupert Neville Lennox-Boyd, 2nd Viscount Boyd of Merton (born 7 December 1939), is a British hereditary peer and former member of the House of Lords.

== Early life and education ==
Lennox-Boyd was born in 1939, the eldest son of Alan Lennox-Boyd, 1st Viscount Boyd of Merton and his wife Lady Patricia Guinness, daughter of Rupert Guinness, 2nd Earl of Iveagh.

He was educated at Eton and at Christ Church, Oxford from which he graduated with a BA in 1962, subsequently promoted to MA in 1966.

== Career ==
Lennox-Boyd was deputy chairman of Arthur Guinness & Sons between 1981 and 1986.

He succeeded to the viscountcy and to a seat in the House of Lords upon his father's death in 1983. He lost his seat following the introduction of the House of Lords Act 1999.

== Marriage and children ==
Lennox-Boyd married Alice Mary Clive (born 24 March 1942) on 24 July 1962. She is the daughter of Major Meysey Clive and his wife, the writer Lady Mary Clive (née Pakenham) and the granddaughter of Thomas Pakenham, 5th Earl of Longford. They have four children:

- Hon. Charlotte Mary Lennox-Boyd (born 16 April 1963), married Charles Mitchell in 1992 and had issue.
- Hon. Benjamin Alan Lennox-Boyd (born 21 October 1964), married Shelia Mary Margaret Williams in 1993 and had issue. He is the heir apparent to the viscountcy and his son Alan George Simon Lennox-Boyd (born 11 March 1993) is the heir's heir apparent who is named after his great-grandfather.
- Hon. Edward George Lennox-Boyd (born 30 March 1968), married Tamsin Hichens in 1994 and had issue. He changed his name by deed poll to Edward George Clive on 24 November 1999.
- Hon. Philippa Patricia Lennox-Boyd (born 12 March 1970), married Patrick Spens, 4th Baron Spens in 1998 and has issue.

Lord Boyd lived at Ince Castle in Cornwall until 2018, when it was sold.

== Arms ==
Coat of arms of Simon Lennox-Boyd, 2nd Viscount Boyd of Merton

Crest
A dexter hand erect in pale having two fingers turned in and the rest pointing upwards Proper the wrist habited in a close sleeve Azure with cuff chequy Argent and Gules.
Escutcheon
Azure a fess chequy Argent and Gules between an abbatical mitre simplex of the second filleted of the third in chief and in base a rose of the second seeded Vert and barbed of the third.
Supporters
Two squirrels Proper having collars chequy Argent and Gules

== Notes ==
Peerage of the United Kingdom
Preceded by Alan Lennox-Boyd	Viscount Boyd of Merton; 1983–present Member of the House of Lords (1983–1999)	Incumbent; Heir apparent: Hon. Benjamin Lennox-Boyd
