= Alan Lennox-Boyd, 1st Viscount Boyd of Merton =

British politician (1904–1983)

The Right Honourable The Viscount Boyd of Merton CH PC DL
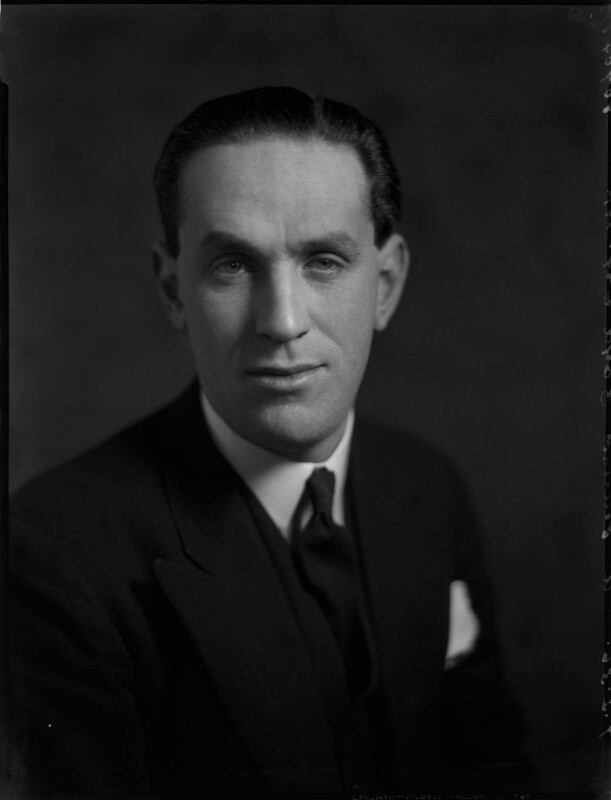
- Lennox-Boyd in 1936

Secretary of State for the Colonies
- In office 28 July 1954 – 14 October 1959
- Prime Minister: Winston Churchill; Sir Anthony Eden; Harold Macmillan
- Preceded by: Oliver Lyttelton
- Succeeded by: Iain Macleod

Minister of Transport and Civil Aviation
- In office 7 May 1952 – 28 July 1954
- Prime Minister: Winston Churchill
- Preceded by: John Maclay
- Succeeded by: John Boyd-Carpenter

Minister of State for the Colonies
- In office 2 November 1951 – 7 May 1952
- Prime Minister: Winston Churchill
- Preceded by: John Dugdale
- Succeeded by: Henry Hopkinson

Member of the House of Lords Lord Temporal
- In office 8 September 1960 – 8 March 1983; Hereditary peerage
- Preceded by: Peerage created
- Succeeded by: The 2nd Viscount Boyd of Merton

Member of Parliament for Mid Bedfordshire
- In office 27 October 1931 – 8 September 1960
- Preceded by: Milner Gray
- Succeeded by: Stephen Hastings

Personal details
- Born: Alan Tindal Lennox-Boyd; 18 November 1904 Bournemouth, Dorset, England
- Died: 8 March 1983 (aged 78) London, England
- Resting place: Church of St Stephen, Saltash, Cornwall
- Party: Conservative
- Spouse: Lady Patricia Guinness (m. 1938)
- Children: 3
- Education: Sherborne School
- Alma mater: Christ Church, Oxford

Alan Tindal Lennox-Boyd, 1st Viscount Boyd of Merton, CH, PC, DL (18 November 1904 – 8 March 1983), was a British Conservative politician.

== Background, education and military service ==
Lennox-Boyd was born on 18 November 1904 in Bournemouth, the son of Alan Walter Lennox-Boyd by his second wife Florence Annie, daughter of James Warburton Begbie and Anna Maria née Reid. He had an elder half-sister and three full brothers, two of whom were killed in the Second World War and one who died in Germany in April 1939. He was educated at Sherborne School, Dorset, and graduated from Christ Church, Oxford, with a BA later promoted to MA. For three years during the Second World War, he was a lieutenant in the Royal Naval Volunteer Reserve, and for a portion of that time, he was with the Coastal Forces.

== Political career ==
Lennox-Boyd was elected as Member of Parliament (MP) for Mid Bedfordshire in 1931 (at the age of 26), and was admitted to Inner Temple, as a barrister in 1941. He was a member of Winston Churchill's peacetime government as Minister for Transport and Civil Aviation from 1952 to 1954.

As a Minister, he opened the third Woodhead Tunnel on the British Railways electrified railway across the Pennines on 3 June 1954.

In 1954, he became Secretary of State for the Colonies, where he oversaw early stages of decolonisation, with the granting of independence to Cyprus, Ghana, Malaya and Sudan. He was in office during the Mau Mau Rebellion in Kenya, and was persuaded to stay in office by Harold Macmillan after being censured for the Hola massacre. He talked openly about independence for the Federation of Malaya, and invited the then Chief Minister of Malaya, Tunku Abdul Rahman and his colleagues to Lancaster House to discuss the possibility of independence.

In 1955, as Secretary of State for the Colonies, Lennox-Boyd threatened to resign from the cabinet when some Conservative cabinet members wanted to introduce immigration controls on the New Commonwealth (predominantly non-white colonies and commonwealth member states). Britain was experiencing an unexpectedly large inflow from non-white races as a result of the British Nationality Act 1948. This act, authored and enacted by the previous Labour government, granted British citizenship (CUKC) to the entire Commonwealth. He maintained a strict ideological stance that British citizenship should be applied uniformly across the British Empire and the Commonwealth of Nations. Lennox-Boyd demanded that the government either place immigration controls on the entire Commonwealth—thereby including the Old Commonwealth (white settler dominions such as Canada, Australia, New Zealand, and historically South Africa)—or impose none at all. As the Cabinet refused to introduce immigration controls on Old Commonwealth citizens, they abandoned any immigration controls. On a personal level, he was known for frequently hosting African and Commonwealth guests at his home.

Following the Suez Crisis of 1956, Lennox-Boyd appears to have made the initial approach to writer Ian Fleming about the possibility of Prime Minister Sir Anthony Eden's using Fleming's Jamaican house, Goldeneye, for a rest cure, given the precarious state of Eden's health. Because of security considerations, he initially intimated to Fleming that he wanted Goldeneye for a holiday of his own and, when he resisted Fleming's suggestion that his and Fleming's wife (a close friend of Lady Eden) liaise over the arrangements, Fleming at first assumed that he was planning an extra-marital assignation.

After the 1959 general election, Lennox-Boyd was replaced as Colonial Secretary by Iain Macleod. In September 1960, Lennox-Boyd was raised to the peerage as Viscount Boyd of Merton of Merton-in-Penninghame in the County of Wigtown. This caused a by-election for his Mid Bedfordshire constituency, which was won by Stephen Hastings. He was further honoured the same year when he was appointed a Member of the Order of the Companions of Honour. In 1962, Lennox-Boyd became a joint patron of the Monday Club, a pressure group formed to oppose Macmillan's decolonisation policies. He resigned from the Monday Club in 1968 after the club endorsed Enoch Powell’s anti-immigration Rivers of Blood speech.

== Other public positions and business career ==
Lord Boyd of Merton held the office of Deputy Lieutenant of Bedfordshire between 1954 and 1960 and Deputy Lieutenant of Cornwall in 1965. He was managing director of Arthur Guinness & Sons between 1959 and 1967, and was a Member of the Order of the Companions of Honour and Privy Counsellor.

== Mau Mau rebellion ==
Lennox-Boyd was Minister of State for the Colonies 1951–52, making his first visit to Kenya in 1952. Kenya was governed by Sir Evelyn Baring under emergency powers. The policing of those powers was in the hands of Lieutenant-General Sir George Erskine, commander in chief of East Africa Command. Their War Council included the deputy governor and a representative of the white settlers but of no other social, racial or tribal group.

In 1954, Lennox-Boyd was made Colonial Secretary. Lennox-Boyd's early hands-on visit to South Nyeri in the Kikuyu reserves, for instance, was accompanied by Baring and Erskine. (Virtually the entire Kikuyu population had been moved into fortified villages or detention camps, though the statistics were fudged.) They had a lengthy meeting with Chief Muhindi of Konyu. The Chief and his Home Guards were charged with beating several detainees, one of whom had died. Governor Baring quietly suggested to the assistant police commissioner that it would be politically inexpedient to prosecute such a loyal ally. But dropping the charges offended the impartiality of Colonel Arthur Young, the new chief commissioner. Informed of Young's intention to resign on principle, Lennox-Boyd persuaded Young to reduce his objection to a "difference of opinion", thus leaving Baring and Erskine's manoeuvre in place and Lennox-Boyd's reputation untouched. Supporters of Young were subsequently encouraged to take jobs outside Kenya.

In June 1957, Lennox-Boyd received a secret memorandum written by Sir Eric Griffiths-Jones, the Attorney General of Kenya. The letter described the abuse of Mau Mau detainees. The memorandum was passed on by Baring, who is alleged to have added a covering letter asserting that inflicting "violent shock" was the only way to deal with Mau Mau insurgents. It is clear from Hansard reports of Lennox-Boyd's answers to questions in the House of Commons that Lennox-Boyd entirely supported the Baring–Erskine regime and the attitudes that went with it.

In April 2011, a Guardian report described a cache of government documents which might indicate that, despite clear briefings, Lennox-Boyd repeatedly denied that the abuses were happening, and publicly denounced those colonial officials who came forward to complain. The cache confirmed the earlier findings of Catherine Elkins's Britain's Gulag: the brutal end of empire in Kenya.

== Marriage and children ==
Lennox-Boyd married Lady Patricia Guinness (1918–2001), daughter of Rupert Guinness, 2nd Earl of Iveagh, on 29 December 1938. His mother-in-law, Gwendolen Guinness, Countess of Iveagh, had been an MP in 1927–1935, and he was brother-in-law to Sir Henry ('Chips') Channon, also an MP (1935–1958), making them jointly a first mother-in-law and son-in-law set of MPs.

Lennox-Boyd and Lady Patricia had three sons:

- Simon Donald Rupert Neville Lennox-Boyd, 2nd Viscount Boyd of Merton (born 7 December 1939)
- Hon. Christopher Alan Lennox-Boyd (22 July 1941 – 3 August 2012)
- Hon. Sir Mark Alexander Lennox-Boyd (4 May 1943 – 24 July 2025)

== Death ==
Lord Boyd of Merton died on 8 March 1983, when he was struck by a car on Fulham Road in London. After cremation, he was buried at St Stephen's Church, Saltash, Cornwall. He was succeeded in the viscountcy by his eldest son, Simon.

Lady Boyd of Merton died in May 2001, aged 83. She gave her name to the Viscountess of Merton cup, awarded at the Cornwall Spring Flower Show.

According to many sources, Lennox-Boyd was bisexual. He is depicted in James Lees-Milne's diary of 1942–1943, Ancestral Voices, as being infatuated with the American aesthete Stuart Preston. His passionate gay love affairs (and their recklessness), are revealed in Channon's diaries. Historian and biographer Michael Bloch describes the former regent and Crown Prince of Iraq, 'Abd al-Ilah, as being homosexual and a "close friend" of Lennox-Boyd. Bloch writes that after 'Abd al-Ilah was killed during the 14 July Revolution in 1958, "the revolutionaries discovered intimate letters from Lennox-Boyd among the Prince's papers, which they released to the world's press."

== Arms ==
Coat of arms of Alan Lennox-Boyd, 1st Viscount Boyd of Merton

Crest
A dexter hand erect in pale having two fingers turned in and the rest pointing upwards Proper the wrist habited in a close sleeve Azure with cuff chequy Argent and Gules.
Escutcheon
Azure a fess chequy Argent and Gules between an abbatical mitre simplex of the second filleted of the third in chief and in base a rose of the second seeded Vert and barbed of the third.
Supporters
Two squirrels Proper having collars chequy Argent and Gules

Parliament of the United Kingdom
Preceded by Milner Gray	Member of Parliament for Mid Bedfordshire; 1931–1960	Succeeded by Stephen Hastings
Political offices
Preceded by John Dugdale	Minister of State for the Colonies; 1951–1952	Succeeded by Henry Hopkinson
Preceded by John Maclay	Minister of Transport; 1952–1953	Succeeded by himself as Minister of Transport and Civil Aviation
Preceded by John Maclay	Minister of Civil Aviation; 1952–1952	Succeeded by himself as Minister of Transport and Civil Aviation
New title	Minister of Transport and Civil Aviation; 1953–1954	Succeeded by John Boyd-Carpenter
Preceded by Oliver Lyttelton	Secretary of State for the Colonies; 1954–1959	Succeeded by Iain Macleod
Peerage of the United Kingdom
New creation	Viscount Boyd of Merton; 1960–1983	Succeeded by Simon Lennox-Boyd
