= Vanessa Toulmin =

British academic specialsing in popular culture (born 1967)

Vanessa Toulmin (born 1967) is an English academic specialising in popular culture. She is Professor and Director of City Culture and Public Engagement at the University of Sheffield, and founded the National Fairground and Circus Archive (NFCA) at the University of Sheffield. She is chair of the Morecambe Winter Gardens Preservation Trust.

== Early life and education ==
Toulmin was born in 1967 in Morecambe, Lancashire, where her mother's family ran the fairground behind Morecambe Winter Gardens. Her mother was from a show family, the O'Connors. The family left Morecambe when she was eight years old, after her grandparents died, and Toulmin took part in travelling fairground life, selling candyfloss and working on children's rides around Lancashire and Wales with her uncles' and aunts' fairs.

Toulmin studied archaeology at the University of Sheffield. She has a PhD (1997) from Sheffield; her 1997 doctoral thesis was "Fun without vulgarity : community, women and language in Showland Society", and her research was carried out in the Centre for English Cultural Tradition and Language. She was awarded the university's Chancellor's Medal, which "is awarded for outstanding attainment in academic, sporting and other personal achievements".

== Career ==
While working on her PhD, Toulmin set up the National Fairground Archive in the University Library, working with the Showmen's Guild of Great Britain and the Fairground Association of Great Britain, and was its first director. The archive received a grant from the National Heritage Lottery Fund to digitise its photographic collection. In 2000, she submitted a memorandum to the House of Commons Select Committee on Environment, Transport and Regional Affairs, on the topic of the value of travelling fairs and the needs of travelling showpeople. She led a project team looking at "COVID-19 and Sheffield's cultural sector: planning for recovery", and together with Sarah Price submitted evidence from this work to Parliament.

In 2007, Toulmin was appointed Professor of Early Film and Popular Entertainment at the University of Sheffield, the first chair in this subject in a British university.

She is a director of the university's Festival of the Mind, established in 2011.

In 2020 she became chair of the Morecambe Winter Gardens Preservation Trust, which is restoring this celebrated theatre. The University of Sheffield supports her work in this voluntary role. She has said that she hopes the restored building will become "the biggest venue between Preston and Cumbria". The volunteers of the trust were collectively awarded the King's Award for Voluntary Service in November 2023.

== Selected publications ==
- Toulmin, Vanessa (1998). Randall Williams : King of Showmen: From Ghost Show to Bioscope. Projection Box. ISBN 978-0-9523941-9-8.
- Toulmin, Vanessa (1999). A Fair Fight: An Illustrated Review of Boxing on British Fairgrounds. World's Fair. ISBN 978-0-9501414-4-2.
- Popple, Simon; Toulmin, Vanessa, eds. (2000). Visual Delights: Essays on the Popular and Projected Image in the 19th Century. Flicks Books. ISBN 978-1-86236-007-5.
- Toulmin, Vanessa; Popple, Simon; Russell, Patrick, eds. (2004). The Lost World of Mitchell and Kenyon: Edwardian Britain on Film. British Film Institute. ISBN 978-1-84457-046-1.
- Toulmin, Vanessa; Popple, Simon, eds. (2005). Visual Delights Two: Exhibition and Reception. John Libbey Eurotext. ISBN 978-0-86196-657-8.
- Toulmin, Vanessa (2011). Blackpool Pleasure Beach: More Than Just an Amusement Park]. Boco Publishing Limited. ISBN 9780956445216.
- Toulmin, Vanessa (October 2013). Blackpool Tower: Wonderland of the World. Boco Publishing Limited. ISBN 978-0-9564452-3-0.
- Toulmin, Vanessa (2019). Electric Edwardians: The Films of Mitchell and Kenyon. Bloomsbury Publishing. ISBN 978-1-83871-552-6.
