= St Laurence's Church, Morecambe =

Coordinates: 54.0713°N 2.8684°W

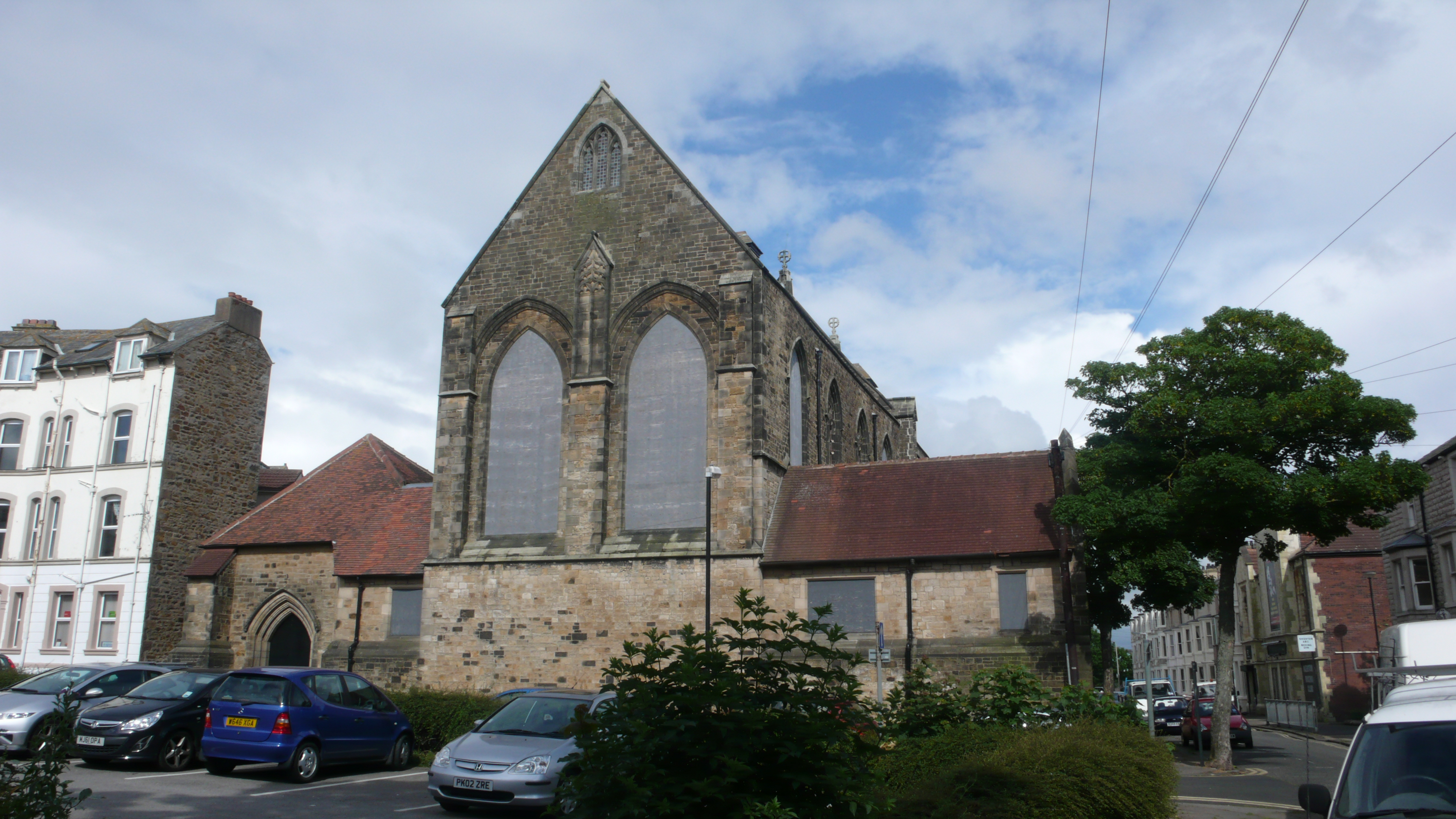
- St Laurence's Church, Morecambe

- Location in Morecambe
- OS grid reference: SD 433 641
- Location: Morecambe, Lancashire
- Country: England
- Denomination: Anglican

Architecture
- Functional status: Redundant
- Heritage designation: Grade II
- Designated: 6 April 1979
- Architect: Paley and Austin
- Architectural type: Church
- Style: Gothic Revival
- Groundbreaking: 1876
- Completed: 1878

Specifications
- Materials: Sandstone, tile roofs

St Laurence's Church stands at the corner of Chapel Street and Edward Street in Morecambe, Lancashire, England. It is a redundant church, formerly an Anglican parish church. Its benefice has been united with that of Holy Trinity, Morecambe. The former church is recorded in the National Heritage List for England as a designated Grade II listed building.

== History ==
The church was built between 1876 and 1878, and was designed by the Lancaster architects Paley and Austin. Its estimated cost was £8,600 (equivalent to £890,000 in 2025), and it was planned that it should accommodate 610 people. A northwest tower and spire were also planned, but never built. In 1882 an alabaster pulpit, designed by the same architects, was installed in the church, and in 1899 the successors in the practice, Austin and Paley, added stalls. The church was declared redundant on 1 July 1981, and on 16 February 2011 a deed was granted for its conversion for office or shopping use.

== Architecture ==
St Laurence's is constructed in sandstone rubble, and has red tile roofs. Its architectural style is Decorated. The plan consists of a nave and chancel, both with clerestories, north and south aisles, a south porch, a north porch that was intended to be the base for the tower that was never built, a south chapel, and a north vestry. The west front contains two three-light windows containing reticulated tracery. Along both sides, the four clerestory windows of the nave have two lights, and the two clerestory windows of the chancel have three lights. The chapel has two gables, each of which contains a flat-headed two-light window. The east window has five lights, beneath which are flushwork panels of sandstone infilled with rubble. Inside the church are four-bay arcades carried on octagonal piers. Both the nave and chancel have waggon roofs. The internal furnishings have been removed.

== Appraisal ==
The church was designated as a Grade II listed building on 6 April 1979. Grade II is the lowest of the three gradings given by English Heritage, and is granted to buildings that "are nationally important and of special interest". The architectural historian Nikolaus Pevsner considers that this was the best church in Morecambe to have been designed by Paley and Austin.

== See also ==
- Listed buildings in Morecambe
- List of ecclesiastical works by Paley and Austin
