= Morecambe Town Hall =

Municipal building in Morecambe, Lancashire, England

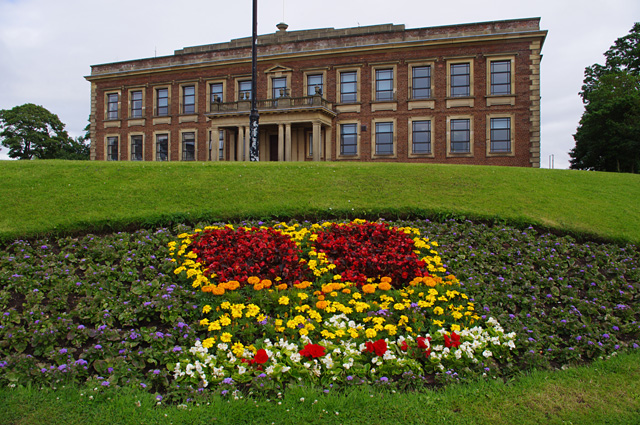
- Morecambe Town Hall

- Shown in Lancashire Location in Morecambe
- 54.0758°N 2.8581°W
- Location: Marine Road, Morecambe

History
- Built: 1932

Site notes
- Architect(s): Alfred Cross and Kenneth Cross
- Architectural style: Neoclassical style

Listed Building – Grade II
- Designated: 8 November 2001
- Reference no.: 1389539

Morecambe Town Hall is a municipal building in Marine Road, Morecambe, Lancashire, England. It is a Grade II listed building.

== History ==
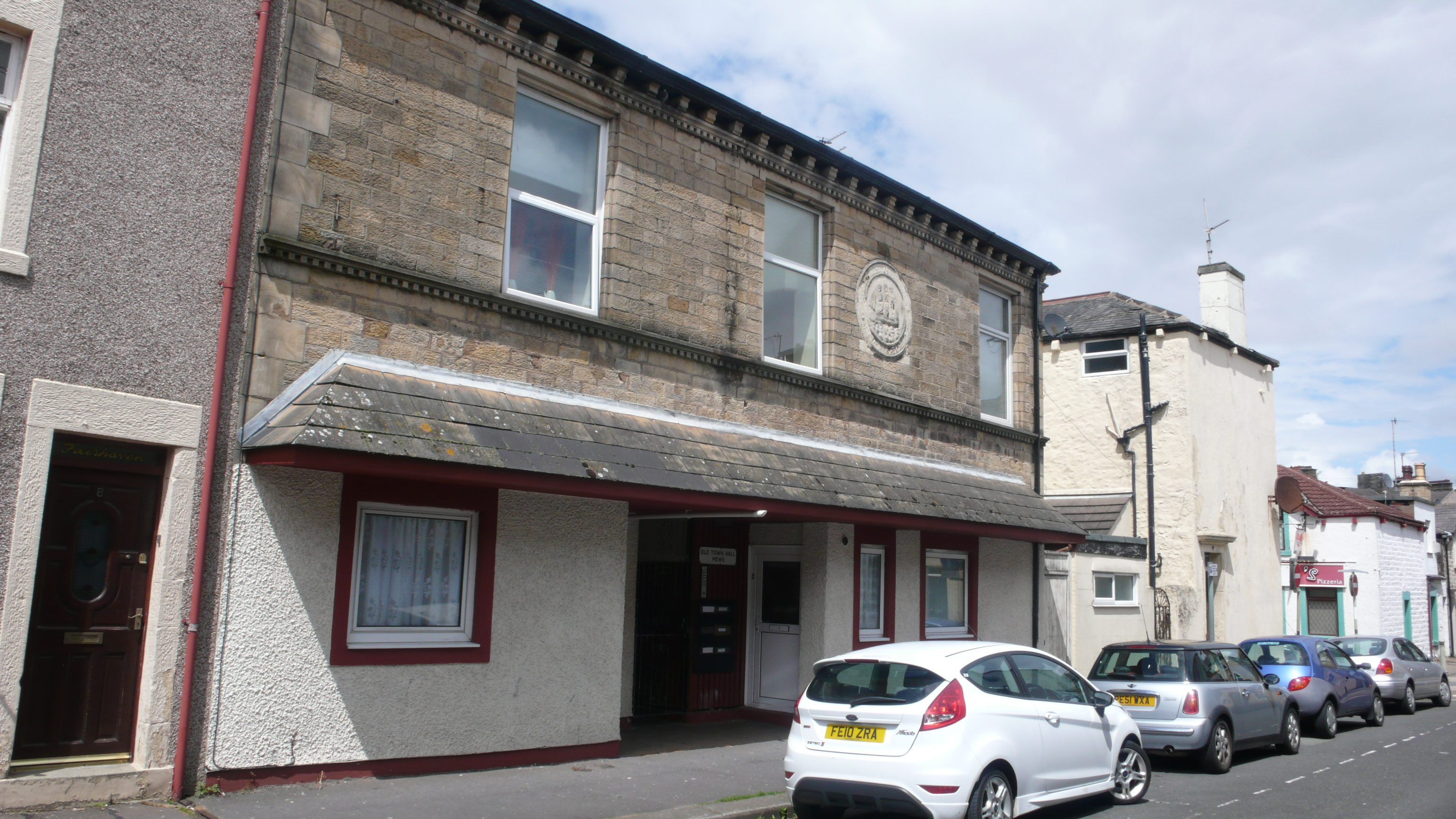
The old town hall on Morecambe Street

The building was commissioned to replace the old 19th century town hall, which had been built for the Poulton, Bare and Torrisholme Local Board of Health, on Morecambe Street. The device of a three-masted ship in full sail, which had been used by Morecambe Corporation, still appears on the front of the old building.

The foundation stone for the new building was laid on 7 August 1931. The new building, which was designed by Alfred Cross and his son, Kenneth Cross, in the Neoclassical style and built by local builders Edmondson Brothers at a cost of £40,000, was officially opened Sir Maurice Jenks, the Lord Mayor of London, on 7 June 1932. Jenks arrived by air from Croydon Aerodrome and the ceremony was broadcast to radio listeners. The design for the town hall featured a large mosaic set into the terrazzo marble flooring in the entrance hall bearing the town crest "Beauty surrounds, health abounds".

The town hall became the headquarters of Municipal Borough of Morecambe and Heysham on completion and, although the borough amalgamated with the Municipal Borough of Lancaster in 1974, because of the ample size of the council chamber at Morecambe, meetings of the full council of the City of Lancaster have been held in Morecambe Town Hall ever since. The shallow pyramidal glazed roof was restored in the 1980s.

An archway, which had formed an entrance to old Poulton Hall and had been removed to the Morecambe Town Hall site in 1932, was returned to its original location on Poulton Road in 1997. The town hall became a listed building in November 2001 after a campaign by local historians.

The town hall was the venue for celebrations when Morecambe F.C. were promoted to the Football League in 2007 for the first time in their history after winning the Conference Playoff Final, beating Exeter City 2–1 at Wembley on 20 May 2007, in front of over 40,000 fans. A reception for the team and its manager was held at the town hall. The ship's bell and other memorabilia from the frigate HMS Morecambe Bay, which saw action in the early 1950s during the Korean War, were presented by the Morecambe Bay Association and put on display at the town hall in spring 2013.

== See also ==
- Listed buildings in Morecambe
