= Alhambra Theatre, Morecambe =

Former theatre and cinema in Morecambe, England

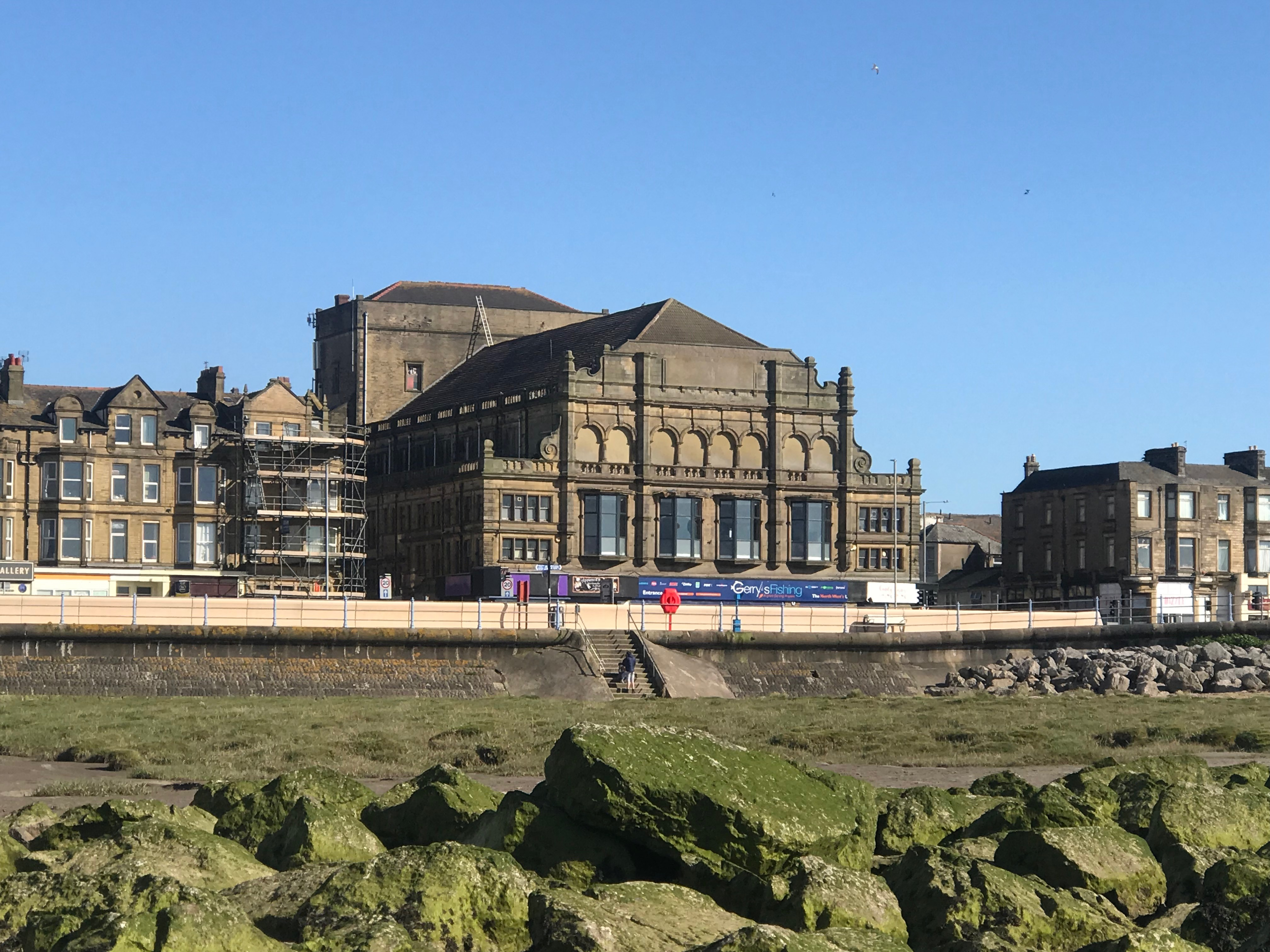
- Alhambra Theatre viewed from Morecambe Bay
- Interactive map of Alhambra Theatre, Morecambe
- Address: Marine Road West; Morecambe; England
- Coordinates: 54°03′58″N 2°52′49″W
- Owner: Ian Bond
- Capacity: 1,100
- Type: Professional Theatre
- Current use: Theatre

Construction
- Opened: 1901; 125 years ago
- Years active: 1901–present
- Architect: Herbert Howarth

Website
- morecambe.me

The Alhambra is a theatre situated on the West End promenade in the English seaside resort of Morecambe, Lancashire. Opened in 1901 as the Alhambra Palace, it took its name, though not its style, from the famous Moorish original in Granada, Spain. The building was in continuous use, with a range of entertainment and social uses, until 1970 when a fire gutted the interior. Following extensive refurbishment the theatre reopened in 1973 as The Inn on the Bay before renaming itself The Carleton Club, becoming a major events venue and one of the great Northern soul dance clubs. After closing in 2016, it reopened it the same year as a multi-purpose venue with capacity up to 1,100. The theatre was the location where Laurence Olivier shot his iconic 1960 film version of John Osborne’s The Entertainer.

== History ==
The Alhambra is the most significant surviving example of Morecambe's West End heritage. Though diminished after the fire of 1970 by the loss of its elaborate Dutch gable and distinctive sun-burner turret, the edifice still dominates and enhances an elegant Victorian curve of promenade. It was built on the site of the old West End Market, which was demolished for this purpose, and the ground floor of the new building was designed as a replacement covered market space. Only the original market sign survived, moved to the back of the building above the new market’s rear entrance. Although postcards with exterior views of the Alhambra Palace are plentiful, there are very few images of its interior. Fortunately, the national press published detailed descriptions at the time.

From conception and design to financing and management the Alhambra Palace, which opened on 4 April 1901, was entirely a local effort, conceived by developers John Gardner and John Scott and young architect Herbert Howarth, all of whom lived nearby. John Edmondson was the experienced local building contractor who also installed the electric lighting in the theatre. He was also responsible for most of Morecambe’s great buildings, including the surviving 1900 Park Hotel up Regent Road from the Alhambra.

For the first few years of their existence, Gardner managed the Alhambra and the Park Hotel, both integral to the partners’ redevelopment of the West End's 1877 Summer Gardens whose 30 acres, including a massive pavilion, had proved unprofitable and located too far from the sea. They built the Park Hotel, Regent Park and surrounding houses on that site and linked them with the then ultra-modern Alhambra Palace on its prime seafront location.

=== Theatre for the West End ===
Topping a special variety bill, Chung Ling Soo, destined to be hailed as one of the world's greatest magicians, topped the Alhambra opening night after the 1901 opening ceremony. Opposite the Alhambra stood the West End Pier with a theatre at the end. However, this burnt down in 1917 and the pier itself was demolished in 1978 after extensive storm damage. For most of the 20th century, the theatre featured refreshment bars and a popular restaurant. In addition, the Alhambra managers spotlit what was in vogue – variety, films, and summer shows – without losing its reputation as a home for amateur, social, and community needs.

The ground floor of the theatre was designed to be used for retail purposes and when it first opened comprised a market, shops, restaurant, and photographer. By 1910 the venue was also licensed as a cinema and regularly screened films in between live theatre and variety revues. In the 1920s it became the Astoria Super Cinema but continued to host other events. It closed as a cinema during World War II when it was requisitioned for use in the war effort, and reopened in 1946.

The venue was closed in 1970, when a projector caught fire in the upper tiers and the entire wood structure of the interior collapsed, although the flames did not spread to the large space of fly tower. The walls and main structure were unaffected by the internal damage, and so, after basic remodelling inside (the suspended ceilings still conceal a cavernous balcony and roof space above), it reopened as the Carleton Club, a huge 'black box' with multi-bars suited to dance and social events. Various restaurants also occupied the front part of the original theatre floor, where ceiling to floor bay windows directly look out on Morecambe Bay.

The club's fortunes faded at exactly the same time that Morecambe's West End became a particular area of major social deprivation as a result of the whole resort's economy collapsing in the 1980s and 1990s. Along with other large buildings in the town such as the iconic Midland Hotel and top leisure park Frontierland at the edge of the West End, the Carleton/Alhambra fell into disuse with only a handful of events put on per year, and it finally closed in 2016.

== The Alhambra today ==
The same year, the building was rescued by local developer Ian Bond who reopened it as an entertainment, conference and community-purpose venue. He also brought new tenants to the shops at street level (the central market space was already occupied by the region's largest angling store, Gerry's Fishing). The venue is currently run by volunteers who are part of the wave of local networks focused on turning around the town's fortunes since the 2000s. In 2019, the charitable company Morecambe Alhambra Theatre Trust was created to formally run the venue along with the established Friends of the Alhambra.

Renaming itself the Alhambra once more, the theatre has designed its multi-community purpose to complement the other nearby renovations or developments along the seafront: the Midland Hotel, the new Promenade wave deflection wall (2019), the similarly renovated Morecambe Winter Gardens theatre, and the planned £80 million Eden Project North by the Midland.

Since 2016, a growing number of cultural events central to the North West of England have found a base at the Alhambra, including Morecambe Punk Festival, steam punk festival A Splendid Day Out and goth club nights Corrosion. The Other National Theatre and the UK Centre of the International Theatre Institute are based at the Alhambra. Morecambe Fringe launched there in 2017 and Hawkwind’s space rock festival Hawkeaster took over the entire venue in 2018.
