= Listed buildings in Morecambe =

Morecambe is a seaside town in the City of Lancaster, Lancashire, England. It contains 44 buildings that are recorded in the National Heritage List for England as designated listed buildings. Of these, two are at Grade II*, the middle grade, and the others are at Grade II, the lowest grade. The town originated as a small fishing village called Poulton, and started to be used as a resort towards the end of the 18th century. It expanded during the 19th century, particularly following the arrival of the railway in 1850. The town was officially renamed Morecambe in 1889.

The older listed buildings include some of those surviving from the earliest village, and include some former farmhouses and farm buildings that have been absorbed by the growing town. There is a seafront terrace of varied houses dating from the early to mid-19th century. Later listed buildings include public buildings, churches, two railway stations that have been converted into other uses, public houses, a theatre, a hotel, a former school, a former cinema, a clock tower, and a war memorial.

== Key ==
Grade	Criteria
II*	Particularly important buildings of more than special interest
II	Buildings of national importance and special interest

== Buildings ==
Name and location	Photograph	Date	Notes	Grade
Poulton Hall Archway; 54.07330°N 2.86063°W		14th century (probable)	The archway was the entrance to Poulton Hall, which was demolished in 1932. It was moved then to the Town Hall, but returned to its original position in 1997. The archway is in sandstone, and consists of a pointed arch with two orders of mouldings and a hood mould.	II
4 Poulton Square; 54.07373°N 2.85885°W		17th century	The house is in rendered cobble with a slate roof, in two storeys and three bays. The central doorway has a moulded surround, a fanlight, and a hood on brackets, and the windows are sashes. Inside, there is exposed cobble in the ground floor rooms.	II
3 and 5 Thorpe Avenue; 54.06614°N 2.83183°W		17th century	A pair of houses, originally one house, in rendered stone with a slate roof, in two storeys and three bays. The main front faces the garden and has a doorway with moulded jambs and an inscribed lintel. The windows are 20th-century casements and, on the rear facing the road, some of the windows are mullioned.	II
8 and 9 Torrisholme Square; 54.06696°N 2.83017°W		1663	Originally one house, later divided into two, it is in cobble with sandstone dressings and a green slate roof. The houses are in an L-plan, and have two storeys and front of two bays. The doorways are in the centre; the left doorway has a chamfered surround and a decorated and inscribed lintel, and the right doorway has a plain surround. The windows are 20th-century casements.	II
Park Farmhouse; 54.07343°N 2.85828°W		1685	A house in cobble with sandstone dressings, a rendered front, and an artificial slate roof. It has two storeys with an attic, and three bays. The windows are sashes, and those in the ground floor are mullioned. The central doorway has a moulded surround and a shaped inscribed lintel.	II
Moss House and barn 54.06265°N 2.87715°W	—	1697	The house and barn are in cobbles, the house with a slate roof, and the barn with a stone-slate roof. The house has three bays at the rear and two at the front, and the windows are mullioned. On the front is a gabled porch and a doorway with an inscribed lintel. The barn is to the right, and contains a carriage entrance. The barn was 'accidentally' destroyed during conversion work to form houses.	II
16 Slyne Road; 54.06700°N 2.83110°W		Mid 18th century (probable)	A house in cobbles with sandstone dressings, and a roof that is slated at the front and has concrete tiles at the back. It has two storeys and two bays. The windows have 20th-century casements and were probably mullioned. There is a blocked window in the left bay.	II
12 Torrisholme Square; 54.06678°N 2.82994°W		Mid 18th century	A pebbledashed house with a concrete tile roof. It has two storeys, and to obays, the right bay being smaller and lower. In the left bay the windows are mullioned with 20th-century casements.	II
New Hall; 54.06603°N 2.83426°W		1810	A cobble house with sandstone dressings and a slate roof. It has two storeys and a main part of two bays. The doorway has a cornice, and the windows are sashes. to the left is a set-back third bay.	II
217, 219 and 221 Marine Road Central; 54.07241°N 2.87058°W	—	Early 19th century	A row of three shops with living accommodation, originally three houses. They are rendered with slate roofs, and have three storeys. In the ground floor are modern shop fronts. Above, each house has two bays, with a bow window in the right bay. On the left return is an oriel window.	II
Mona House; 54.07282°N 2.86301°W		Early 19th century	A sandstone house with a slate roof, in two storeys and two bays. The windows are sashes, on the front in architraves. The central doorway is approached by steps, and has a semi-circular head with a moulded archivolt, a fluted keystone, and moulded imposts.	II
Park House and barn 54.06687°N 2.83134°W	—	Early 19th century (probable)	The house is rendered with a slate roof, it has two storeys and two bays, and the windows are sashes. The barn to the left is in stone and cobbles with a slate roof, and has five bays. It contains a segmental archway, and to the left is an outshut.	II
Bare Hall; 54.07723°N 2.83762°W		1830 (probable)	A house, later used as a residential home, in sandstone with a slate roof, it has two storeys and a three-bay front. On the ground floor are three canted bay windows, and a porch with unfluted Greek Doric columns and a cornice. The upper floor windows are 20th-century casements, some with mullions. On the left return is a re-set doorway with a moulded triangular pediment.	II
Gate piers, Bare Hall; 54.07716°N 2.83710°W		Mid 18th century (probable)	The gate piers are at the entrance to the drive. They are square, in rusticated sandstone, and each has a moulded cornice and a ball finial.	II
333, 334 and 335 Marine Road Central; 54.07531°N 2.86159°W		Early to mid 19th century	Three houses, extended later in the century, in sandstone with slate roofs. No 335 has two storeys with an attic and one bay. The windows are 20th-century casements, and in the attic are paired dormers. No 334 has three storeys, a three-storey canted bay window, and an attic dormer. The porch on the left has three pilasters and a cornice. No 333 was added later and is similar to No 334.	II
336 Marine Road Central; 54.07537°N 2.86148°W		Early to mid 19th century	A sandstone house with a slate roof in two storeys and three bays. There is a central single-storey porch with three pilasters, a cornice, and cast iron cresting. In the left part is a window and in the right part a door. The windows are modern.	II
338 Marine Road Central; 54.07548°N 2.86128°W		Early to mid 19th century	A house, later divided into flats, in sandstone with a slate roof. It has two storeys and three bays. The windows are sashes, and the doorway in the right bay has baseless Tuscan pilasters.	II
341 Marine Road Central; 54.07558°N 2.86103°W	—	Early to mid 19th century	A house that was extended in the 1930s, in sandstone with a slate roof and in two storeys. The original part has two bays in a similar manner. The original left bay contains a two-storey bow window with curved sash windows. The doorway in the right bay has a doorcase with unfluted Doric pilasters, a cornice, and a frieze.	II
342 Marine Road Central; 54.07567°N 2.86089°W	—	Early to mid 19th century	A sandstone house with a slate roof, in two storeys with an attic and two bays. The right bay contains a two-storey canted bay window with coping and a parapet. In the attic are paired dormers with pierced bargeboards and finials. Above the doorway is a hood mould, and the windows are sashes.	II
Abbotsford and Eastleigh; 54.07554°N 2.86114°W		Early to mid 19th century	A pair of mirror-image houses in Jacobean style. They are in sandstone with slate roofs, and have two storeys with attics, and two bays. The inner bays have two-storey canted bay windows, and above are steep shaped gables. The doorways in the outer bays have hoods on corbels. Between the bays, and at the ends, are pilasters rising to pinnacles.	II
Cumbria; 54.07572°N 2.86076°W	—	Early to mid 19th century	A sandstone house with a slate roof in Gothic style. It has two storeys with an attic, and a symmetrical three-bay front. The outer bays contains canted bay windows with embattled parapets. In the centre is a single-storey porch with octagonal corner turrets and crocketed pinnacles. The doorway has a Tudor arch and carving in the spandrels. At the top of the house is a frieze and a pierced parapet flanked by coped gables. The windows are sashes.	II
Fylde Court; 54.07544°N 2.86138°W	—	Early to mid 19th century	A house, later divided into flats, in sandstone with a slate roof. It has two storeys and two bays. In the left bay is a two-storey bow window. The right bay has a doorway with panelled pilasters and a fanlight, and the windows are sashes.	II
Morecambe Public House; 54.07471°N 2.85992°W		Early to mid 19th century	The public house is rendered with sandstone dressings and a slate roof. The main block has three storeys and three bays, and above the central doorway is a cornice. To the left is a two-storey range with three irregular bays, and a canted projection, and to the left of that is another, projecting bay. Most of the windows are sashes, and on the front is an oval date plaque.	II
Craig Convalescent Home; 54.07830°N 2.83850°W		c. 1840	Originally a house known as The Park, then used as a convalescent home for children, and later converted into flats. It is in sandstone with hipped slate roofs. The building is in two storeys, it has a three-bay central part, and single-bay wings added in the 1930s. There is a central porch with pilasters, a cornice, and railings. The windows are sashes, and at the rear the central bay is polygonal.	II
Lodge, Craig Convalescent Home; 54.07844°N 2.83814°W		c. 1840	A rendered house with a hipped slate roof. It has two storeys and a symmetrical three-bay front. The windows are sashes with Gothick glazing.	II
Queen's Hotel; 54.07349°N 2.86529°W		c. 1840	A rendered public house with stone dressings and a hipped artificial slate roof. It has a symmetrical front of three storeys and three bays. Above the central doorway and the ground and first floor windows are dentiled cornices, and the windows in the top floor are sashes.	II
Holy Trinity Church; 54.07463°N 2.85737°W		1840–41	The parish church of the town, it was designed by Edmund Sharpe, replacing an earlier chapel of ease. The aisle was added in 1866, and the chancel by Austin and Paley in 1897. It is in sandstone with a green slate roof, and consists of a nave, a south aisle, a chancel, and a west tower. The tower is in three stages and has clasping buttresses, a west doorway, two clock faces, and a parapet with gables in the centres and corner pinnacles.	II
Churchyard wall, Holy Trinity Church; 54.07473°N 2.85716°W		Mid 19th century	The wall encloses all four sides of the churchyard. It is in cobble and sandstone, and has triangular capping. The wall contains three pairs of gate piers.	II
10 and 11 Torrisholme Square; 54.06686°N 2.83002°W		Mid 19th century	Two sandstone houses with a green slate roof, in two storeys. No 10 has two main bays with a central doorway, and a third bay to the left containing a cart entrance with a segmental arch. No 11 has one bay.	II
Former station and lighthouse 54.07444°N 2.87837°W		Early 1850s	The station and lighthouse are on the Stone Jetty, the former station being a terminus of the North Western Railway. It is in sandstone with a slate roof, in one storey, and with a canopy. Adjoining the west end is a sandstone lighthouse with a square base broaching to an octagonal tower. At the top is a walkway and a lantern surmounted by an ogee cap with a finial.	II
Central Methodist Church; 54.07391°N 2.86257°W		1875–76	The Methodist church is in Italianate style, and built in sandstone with a slate roof. The sides have seven bays, the west front has four bays, and along the sides are two tiers of round-headed windows. At the west end is a portico with a frieze and cornice, and two round arches with granite columns and sandstone foliated capitals. At the top is a gable containing a round window with an inscribed surround.	II
St Lawrence's Church; 54.07139°N 2.86837°W		1876–78	The church, designed by Paley and Austin in Decorated style, is now redundant. It is in sandstone with a red tile roof, and consists of a nave and chancel with clerestory, aisles, a south porch, and north porch that was the base for an intended steeple, a south chapel, and a north vestry.	II
Trinity Methodist Church; 54.06488°N 2.88257°W	—	1896–97	The church, designed by Samuel Wright in Early English style, is in sandstone with slate roofs, and is now redundant. On the sides are two tiers of round-headed windows. At the west end is a four-stage tower with a round-headed doorway, octagonal corner turrets with spirelets, and a central spirelet.	II
Winter Gardens; 54.07230°N 2.87105°W		1897	A theatre by Magnall and Littlewood, with a front of red Ruabon brick and terracotta, and rendering at the rear. Along the ground floor are shop fronts and a canopy. There are three-storey towers at the corners with lunettes and shaped gables with finials. Between the towers is a first-floor arcade, a balustrade, and a central projection, above which is stepped coping with volutes and finials. Inside is a richly decorated entrance hall and an auditorium with two tiers of balconies and elaborate plasterwork.	II*
Barclays Bank; 54.07242°N 2.86645°W		c. 1900	The bank is on a corner site and is in Bavarian style, built in sandstone with a steep red tile roof. There are three storeys and two attic storeys. The bays are separated by semi-octagonal buttresses. On the corner is a canted bay with a modern doorway, above which is a mullioned window and a carved frieze, and it is surmounted by a spire with a lead finial.	II
Clock tower 54.07352°N 2.86602°W		1904–05	The clock tower is in brick with banding and dressings in sandstone. The tower is square on a cruciform base with corner buttresses. In the lowest stage are seats under canopies. Above are three-light mullioned windows, and higher are lozenge windows. The clock stage has corbels, and circular clock faces with keystones. On the top is a tent-shaped roof with a metal finial.	II
Railway station 54.07129°N 2.87466°W		1907	The station was built for the Midland Railway, re-using material from an earlier station, and since its closure it been converted for other uses. It is in sandstone with slate roofs, and in Elizabethan style. There is a central two-storey block flanked by six-bay wings leading to gabled pavilions. In the middle of the central block is a gable containing a clock face. In front of the block is a porte-cochère on four cast iron columns.	II
Former Art and Technical School; 54.07283°N 2.86140°W		1912	The former school is in red Accrington brick with stone dressings and a Lakeland slate roof, and is in Baroque style. It has an irregular rectangular plan and is mainly in two storeys over a basement. The main entrance has three storeys with steps leading to a round-headed porch with a Gibbs surround above which is a balcony with railings. At the top is a dentillated pedimented gable containing a Diocletian window. On the roof is a cupola with a domed lead cap and a weathervane in the form of a ship in sail. There are two smaller cupolas towards the rear.	II
War Memorial; 54.07264°N 2.87247°W		1921	The war memorial, by Thomas Mawson consists of a rectangular stepped granite base with tapering sides carrying the bronze statue of a seated lion. Around the base are the names of those lost in the two world wars.	II
Town Hall; 54.07590°N 2.85824°W		1931	The town hall is in Neo-Georgian style, and is built in red-brown brick with parts in Darley Dale stone on a steel frame. It is in two storeys with a basement and has fronts of 13 and 16 bays. In the middle three bays of the entrance front six wide steps lead up to a single-storey Tuscan portico with paired columns, a triglyph frieze, and a balustrade with urns.	II
Midland Hotel; 54.07217°N 2.87531°W		1932–33	The hotel was designed by Oliver Hill for the London, Midland and Scottish Railway, and was restored in 2005–08 by Urban Splash. It is in concrete and rendered brick on a steel frame. It has a curved plan, and is in three storeys. Near the centre is a circular drum containing the entrance, the hotel has a curved south end, at the north end is a circular glazed café, and there are balconies along the rear.	II*
Wall and piers, Midland Hotel; 54.07197°N 2.87480°W	—	1933	The wall and entrance piers were designed by Oliver Hill and are rendered. The walls have curved ends at the entrances and the piers consist of ramped spirals.	II
Former Odeon Cinema and shops 54.07179°N 2.85814°W		1937	The former cinema and shops, the whole building later all used for retail, has a steel frame clad in brown brick and faience, with roofs of reinforced concrete and felt. There is a U-shaped plan, with the cinema on a corner site, a parallel range of shops to the south, a quadrant entrance foyer at the southeast and a northeast auditorium foyer with a rounded angle.	II
