= Holy Trinity Church, Morecambe =

Coordinates: 54.0746°N 2.8575°W

Morecambe Parish Church
- Holy Trinity Church, Morecambe
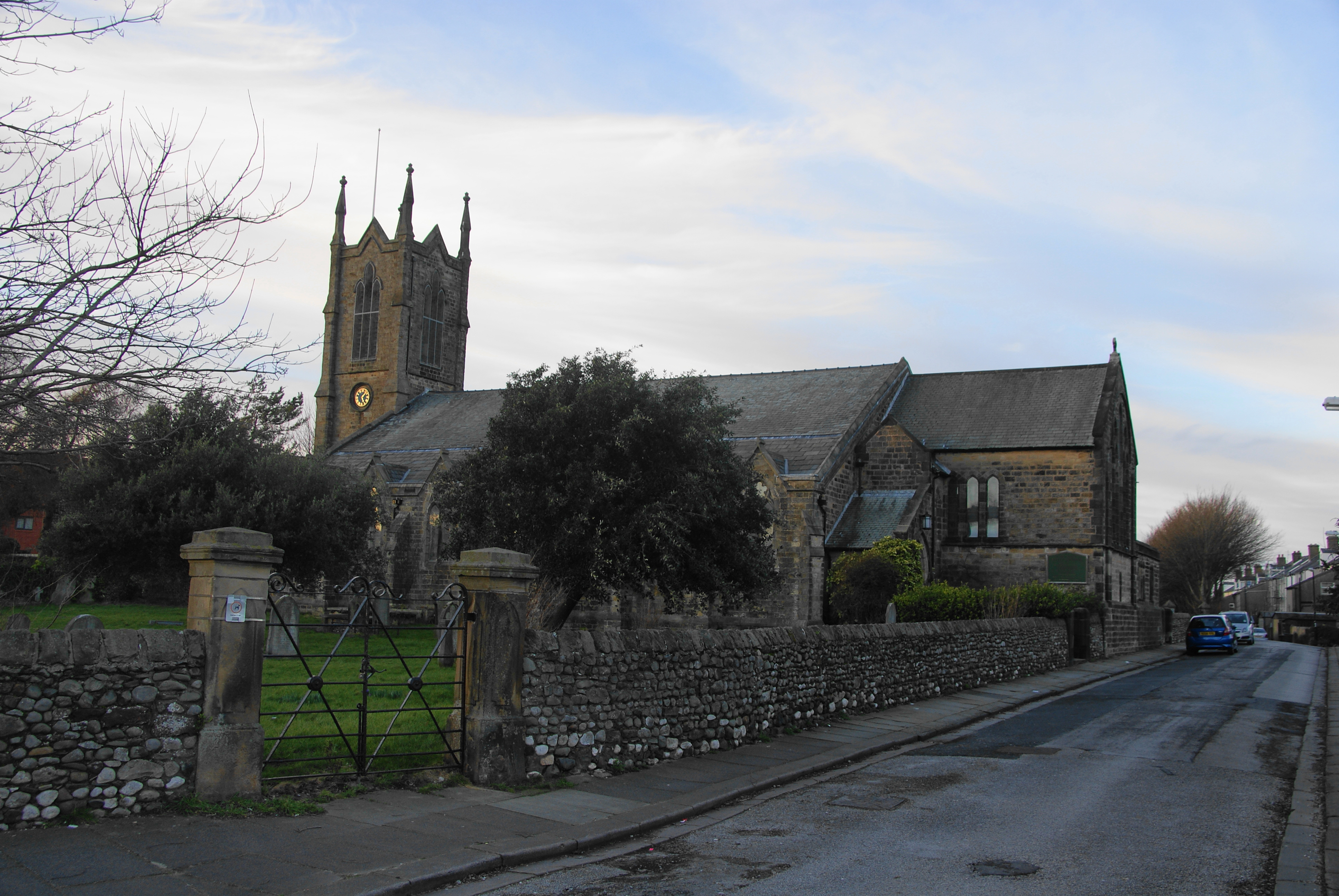
- Holy Trinity Church, Morecambe, from the south

- Location in Morecambe
- OS grid reference: SD 440,646
- Location: Church Street, Morecambe, Lancashire
- Country: England
- Denomination: Anglican
- Website: Morecambe Parish Church

History
- Status: Parish church
- Founded: March 1840
- Dedication: Holy Trinity
- Consecrated: 1841

Architecture
- Functional status: Active
- Heritage designation: Grade II
- Architect(s): Edmund Sharpe; Austin and Paley
- Architectural type: Church
- Style: Gothic Revival
- Groundbreaking: 1840
- Completed: 1897
- Construction cost: £1288

Specifications
- Materials: Sandstone, green slate roof

Administration
- Province: York
- Diocese: Blackburn
- Archdeaconry: Lancaster
- Deanery: Lancaster
- Parish: Poulton-le-Sands, Holy Trinity, with Morecambe, St. Laurence

Clergy
- Rector: Rev'd Christopher Krawiec

Holy Trinity Church, Morecambe, or Morecambe Parish Church, is in Church Street, Morecambe, Lancashire, England. It is the Anglican parish church of Morecambe, in the deanery of Lancaster, the archdeaconry of Lancaster and the diocese of Blackburn. The church is recorded in the National Heritage List for England as a designated Grade II listed building.

== History ==
The original church was built as a chapel of ease of St Mary's, Lancaster in 1745 on land bequeathed for the purpose in the will of Francis Bowes, the village blacksmith, who died in 1742. This was before the creation of the town of Morecambe from three former villages; this building was in Poulton-le-Sands. By the early 1800s the chapel was too small for the growing population. It was rebuilt in 1840–41 to a design by the Lancaster architect Edmund Sharpe. The foundation stone was laid on 16 June 1840, and the new church was consecrated on 15 June 1841 by the Bishop of Chester. The church cost £1,288 (equivalent to £120,000 in 2025) to build, and Queen Victoria made a personal contribution to this. As originally built, the church seated 498 people. A south aisle was added in 1866 by Sharpe's successor, E. G. Paley. In 1897 Austin and Paley, (further successors in the architectural practice), added a new chancel, an organ chamber, and vestries, and provided an additional 69 seats, at an estimated cost of £1,160. A Lady chapel was created in the southeast of the church in 1966. In 1995 the church was re-ordered to celebrate 250 years since the foundation of the church.

== Architecture ==
=== Exterior ===
The church is built in sandstone with a green slate roof. Its plan consists of a west tower, a nave with a south aisle and a north transept, and a chancel with its roof at a lower level. In the angle between the transept and the chancel is a vestry. The tower has three stages with corner buttresses. There is a west door with three lancet windows above it. On the west and south sides of the middle stage are clock faces. In the top stage are triple stepped lancet bell openings. The tower is surmounted by a parapet that rises to a triangular gable above each bell opening, and there are pinnacles at the corners. The north wall of the nave consists of six bays, separated by buttresses and containing lancet windows. The south wall has seven bays, also separated by buttresses; the windows have two lights, and over each window the parapet rises to a triangle. The east window has five lights.

=== Interior ===
Internally there is a seven-bay arcade carried on octagonal timber columns, and a west gallery containing the coat of arms of Queen Victoria. Stained glass in the chancel, and some of it elsewhere in the church, is by Shrigley and Hunt. Other glass is by Abbott and Company, and by the Loyne Ecclesiastical Studios. The Lady Chapel contains a Westmorland slate altar. In the vestry is a tablet from the original church commemorating Francis Bowes. In the south aisle is a memorial to the South African War dating from about 1904, composed of copper and brass repoussé work. There is a ring of eight bells: the original six were recast and augmented to eight in 1939 by John Taylor & Co.

== See also ==
- Listed buildings in Morecambe
- List of architectural works by Edmund Sharpe
- List of ecclesiastical works by E. G. Paley
- List of ecclesiastical works by Austin and Paley (1895–1914)
