= Jenks baronets =

Baronetcy in the Baronetage of the United Kingdom

The Jenks baronetcy, of Cheape in the City of London, is a title in the baronetage of the United Kingdom. It was created on 8 October 1932 for Maurice Jenks, Lord Mayor of London from 1931 to 1932.

== Jenks baronets, of Cheape (1932) ==
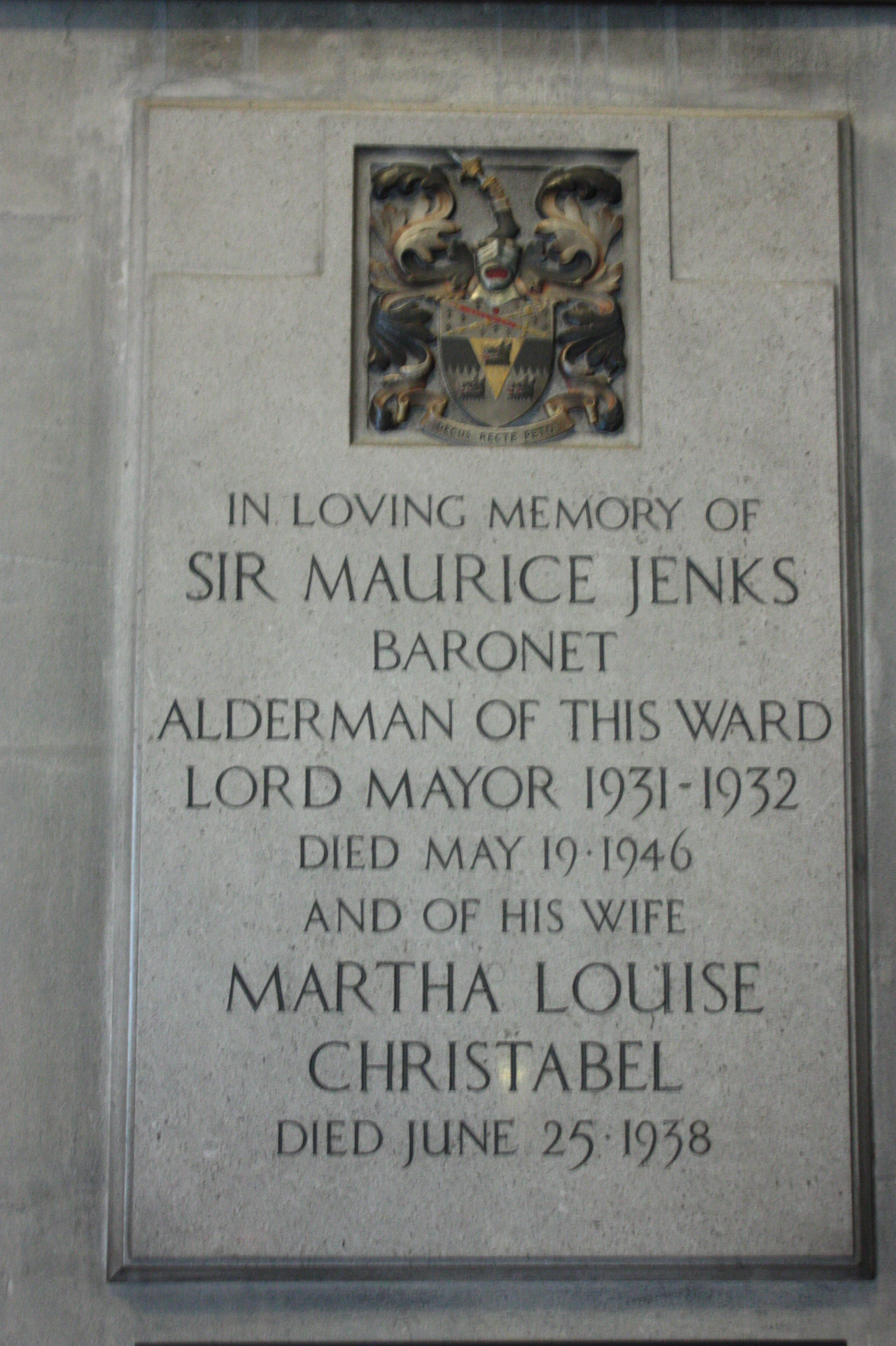
Sir Maurice Jenks' memorial in St Lawrence Jewry Guild Church

- Sir Maurice Jenks, 1st Baronet (1872–1946)
- Sir Richard Atherley Jenks, 2nd Baronet (1906–1993)
- Sir Maurice Arthur Brian Jenks, 3rd Baronet (1933–2004)
- Sir Richard John Peter Jenks, 4th Baronet (born 1936)

The heir apparent is the present holder's son Richard Albert Benedict Jenks (born 1965).
