= Morecambe and Heysham War Memorial =

War memorial in Morecambe, Lancashire, England

Coordinates: 54.07261°N 2.87244°W

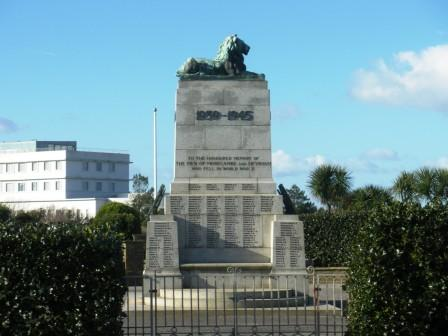
The Morecambe and Heysham Memorial

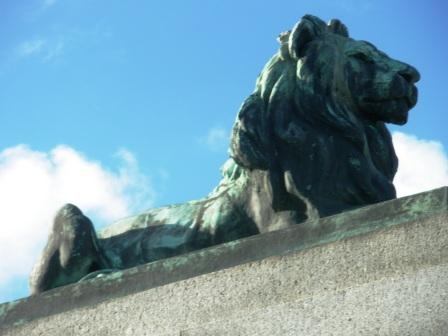
Closer view of the lion atop the memorial

The Morecambe and Heysham War Memorial stands on the Promenade at Morecambe, Lancashire, England.

It has two inscriptions in black lettering, after which are listed the names of those remembered

1914–1919
TO THE HONOURED MEMORY OF
THE MEN OF MORECAMBE
WHO FELL IN WORLD WAR I
THEIR NAME LIVETH FOR EVERMORE

1939–1945
TO THE HONOURED MEMORY OF
THE MEN OF MORECAMBE AND HEYSHAM
WHO FELL IN WORLD WAR II

The memorial remembers the 216 men who died in the First World War, the 180 in the Second World War and the single man who was killed in the Korean War.

The war memorial, made of bronze and granite, was completed in 1921 and designed by Thomas Hayton Mawson. A bronze lion sits atop a stepped base. On 20 January 1993 the monument was registered as a Grade II structure at British Listed Buildings.

== See also ==
- Listed buildings in Morecambe
