= Greenaway baronets =

Title in the Baronetage of the United Kingdom

- Creation date: 1933; 92 years ago
- Status: extant
- Motto: Aut nunquam tentes aut perfice, Either do not attempt, or complete

The Greenaway Baronetcy, of Coombe in the County of Surrey, is a title in the Baronetage of the United Kingdom. It was created on 23 October 1933 for Percy Walter Greenaway. He was Chairman of Daniel Greenaway & Sons, printers and stationers, and served as Lord Mayor of London from 1932 to 1933. As of 2015 the title is held by his great-grandson, the fourth Baronet, who succeeded his father in that year.

== Greenaway baronets, of Coombe (1933) ==
- Sir Percy Walter Greenaway, 1st Baronet (1874–1956)
- Sir Derek Burdick Greenaway, 2nd Baronet (1910–1994)
- Sir John Michael Burdick Greenaway, 3rd Baronet (1944–2015)
- Sir Thomas Edward Burdick Greenaway, 4th Baronet (born 1985)
