= Sir Percy Greenaway, 1st Baronet =

British politician (1874–1956)

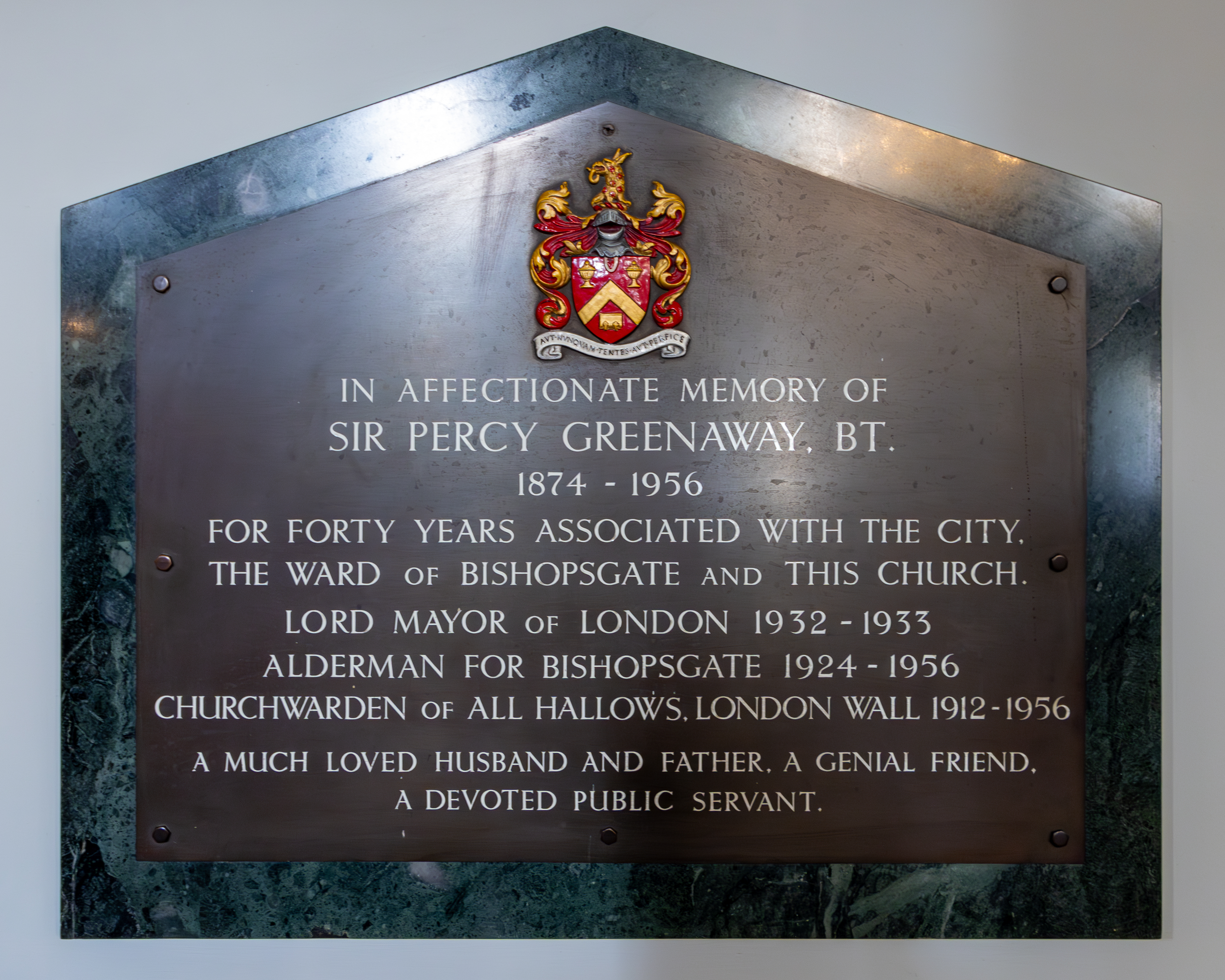
Memorial in St Botolph-without-Bishopsgate church

Sir Percy Walter Greenaway, 1st Baronet (11 June 1874 – 25 November 1956) was Lord Mayor of London for 1932 to 1933.

== See also ==
- Greenaway baronets

Civic offices
Preceded by Sir Maurice Jenks	Lord Mayor of London; 1932–1933	Succeeded by Sir Charles Collett
Baronetage of the United Kingdom
New creation	Baronet (of Coombe); 1933–1956	Derek Burdick Greenaway
