= Stone Jetty =

Jetty in Morecambe, Lancashire

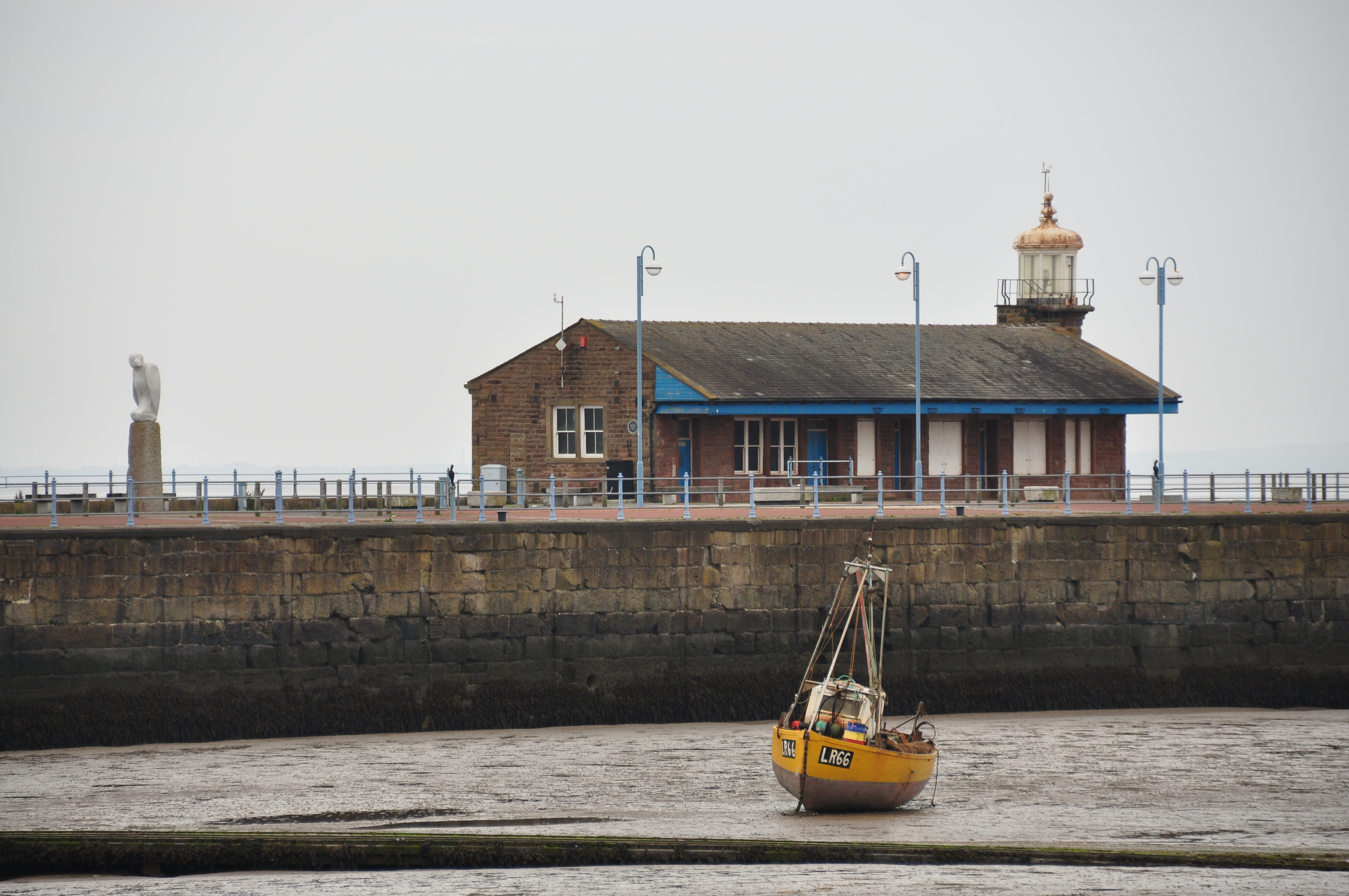
- Coordinates: 54.07425°N 2.87780°W

Characteristics
- Total length: 250 metres (270 yd)

History
- Opening date: 1853
- Location in Morecambe

The Stone Jetty is a jetty in Morecambe, Lancashire, England. It was built by the North Western Railway in 1853 as a wharf and rail terminal for both passenger and cargo transport. The former station building with adjoining lighthouse stand on the jetty and are Grade II-listed. The jetty was resurfaced and partly rebuilt in the 1990s as part of coastal defence works, which was combined with the installation of public art and sculptures.
