= Maurice Jenks =

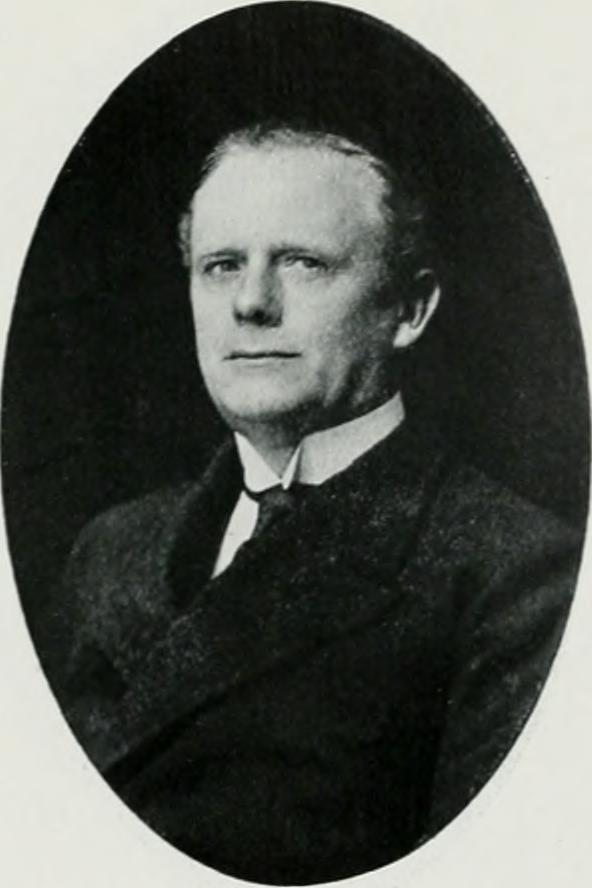
Maurice Jenks F.C.A. C.C.

Sir Maurice Jenks, 1st Baronet, (25 November 1872 – 19 May 1946) was the 604th Lord Mayor of London from 1931 to 1932.

== Life and career ==
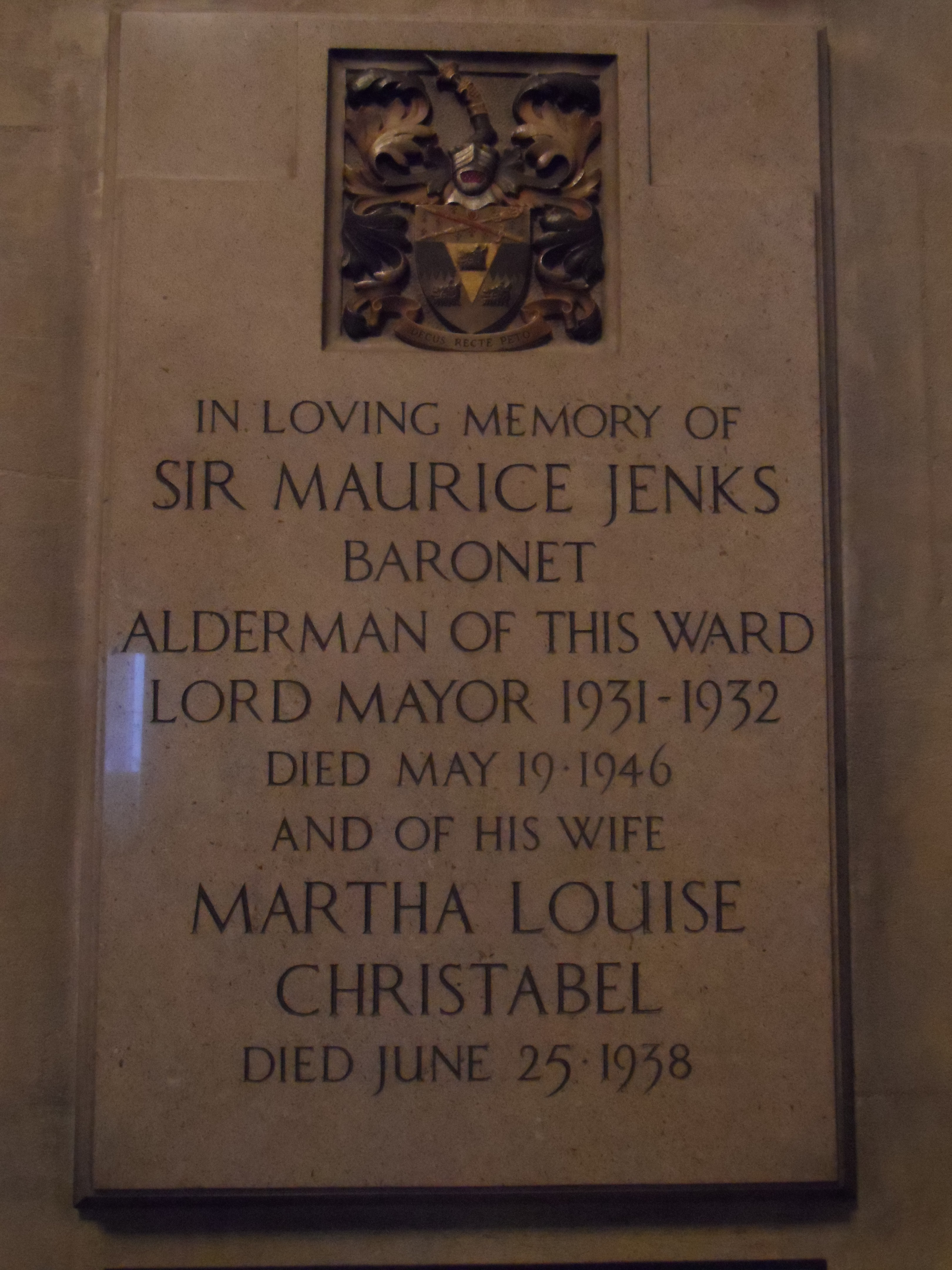
Memorial tablet in St Lawrence Jewry

The son of Robert Isaac Jenks and Frances née Garnett, of Warrington, Lancashire, he qualified as a chartered accountant (FCA).

Managing Partner of Maurice Jenks, Percival & Co. (Chartered Accountants), he was elected as a Common Councilman for Cheapside in 1910 and served as Alderman for the Ward of Cheapside in the City from his election in 1923.

He was elected a Sheriff of London for 1930-31 and as Lord Mayor of London for 1931–32. He was knighted in 1931 and created a Baronet, of Cheape, City of London on 8 October 1932.

Jenks served on the Post Office Advisory Committee and the Railway Rates Committee and was conferred with an Hon LLD by London University, the Honorary Freedom of the City of London and of Scarborough and Kommandør af 1. grad of the Order of Dannebrog.

He married firstly on 14 April 1903 Martha Louise Christabel (died 25 June 1938) youngest daughter of George Calley Smith of Bath and secondly on 6 January 1939 Constance Edith (died 25 May 1995) daughter of William Richard Currie, of Eden Park, Beckenham, Kent, and died 19 May 1946. He had 2 sons and a daughter and was succeeded as baronet by his eldest son Sir Richard Atherley Jenks, 2nd Baronet.

== See also ==
- Jenks baronets
- City of London

Civic offices
Preceded by Sir William Neal, 1st Baronet	Lord Mayor of London; 1931–1932	Succeeded by Sir Percy Greenaway, 1st Baronet
Baronetage of the United Kingdom
New creation	Baronet (of Cheape); 1932–1946	Succeeded by Richard Jenks
