= Morecambe Winter Gardens =

Entertainment venue in Morecambe, England

The Winter Gardens
- Victoria Pavilion Theatre
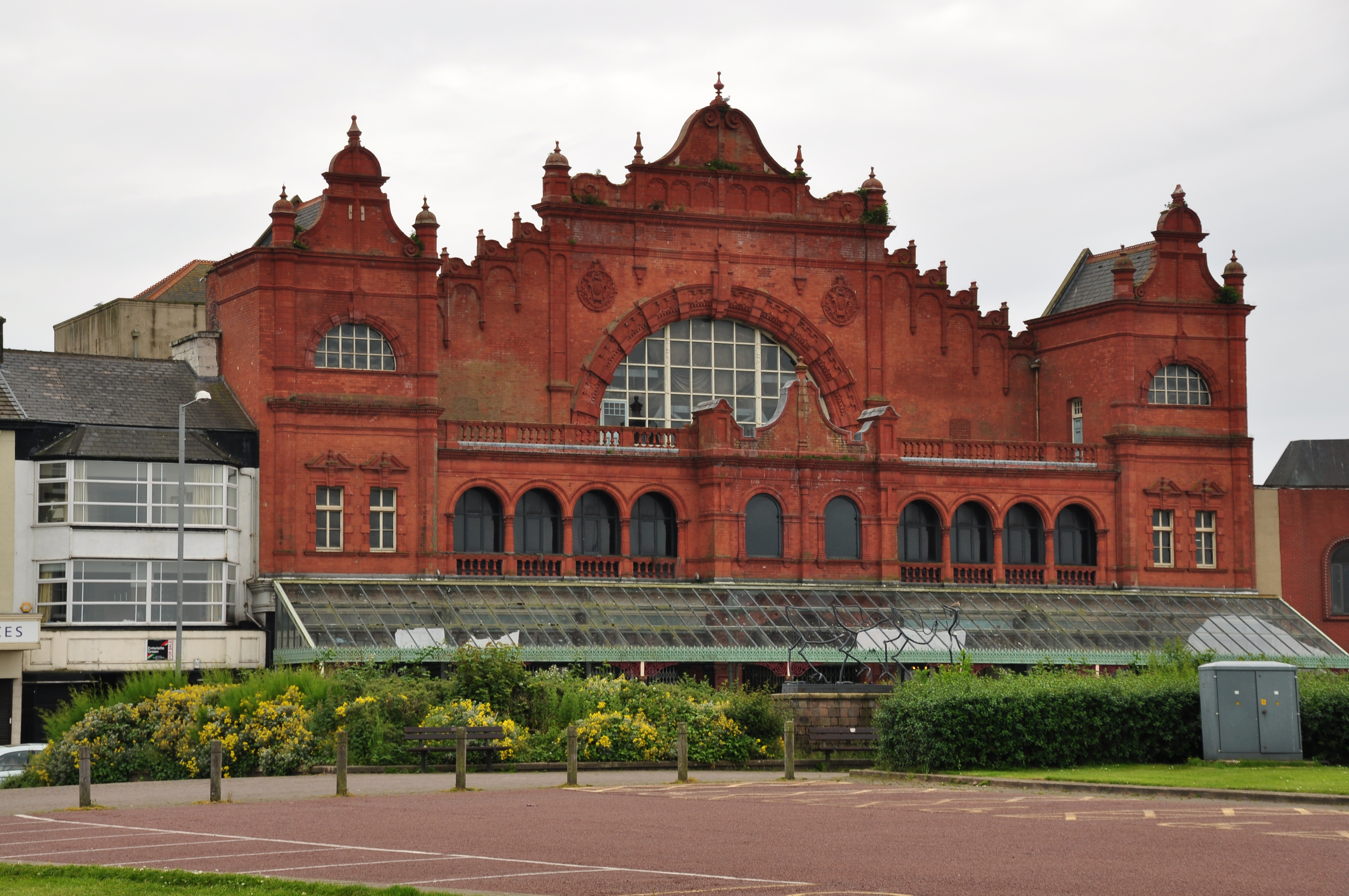
- The exterior of the Winter Gardens, taken from the promenade.

- Location in Morecambe
- Address: 209 Marine Road Central; Morecambe; United Kingdom
- Coordinates: 54.07211°N 2.87102°W
- Owner: The Morecambe Winter Gardens Preservation Trust Ltd
- Current use: Under restoration

Listed Building – Grade II*
- Official name: The Winter Gardens
- Designated: 7 October 1977
- Reference no.: 1025280

Construction
- Opened: 1897
- Closed: 1977
- Architects: Mangnall and Littlewood

Website
- http://www.morecambewintergardens.co.uk/

The Winter Gardens is a Grade II* listed building in Morecambe, Lancashire, England. Designed by architects Mangnall and Littlewood, with Frank Matcham as a consulting architect, it was originally built as the Victoria Pavilion Theatre in 1897 (opened on Monday, 19 July 1897) and was an extension to the existing Winter Gardens complex, which has since been demolished. The theatre closed to the public in 1977 and was listed the same year. It is considered to be one of Morecambe's most significant features, and a campaign for its restoration has been ongoing since 1986.

== History ==
The Victoria Pavilion Theatre was built in 1897 as part of an existing complex. Dating from 1878, the original complex included seawater baths, bars and a ballroom. In the 1950s, the Winter Gardens were taken over by Moss Empires, however declining profits in the following decades led to its closure in 1977. Although the theatre building that remains today was listed the same year, the ballroom building was demolished in 1982.

In 2008, as part of an appraisal of the Morecambe Conservation Area, the Winter Gardens were listed as one of the area's most significant features, as the main example of the remnants of the resort's nineteenth century entertainment buildings. In 2008, the Winter Gardens were featured on the tenth series of the ghost hunting show Most Haunted. They returned in October 2009, when the Winter Gardens was opened to the public as the live audience venue for the eight consecutive nights of the Most Haunted Live! broadcast.

== Preservation and restoration ==
The Friends of the Winter Gardens were formed in 1986 to represent the interests of the building, and campaigned for its preservation and restoration. In 2006, the Friends formed a charitable trust company, The Morecambe Winter Gardens Preservation Trust (Ltd), to purchase the Winter Gardens. In 2009, Lancaster City Council applied for a grant from the government's Sea Change programme, which is intended to promote regeneration in coastal towns. The grant of £4m would have resulted in the trust receiving matching funding from the North West Development Agency (NSWDA), and allowed them to apply for a further £4.5m from the Heritage Lottery Fund (HLF). This would have brought them close to the total needed to complete the refurbishment, however in November 2009 it was announced that their bid was unsuccessful.

In October 2021, the building was one of 142 sites across England to receive part of a £35 million injection into the government's Culture Recovery Fund. In March 2023 it received a further £2.8 million from the Cultural Investment Fund.

The volunteers of the trust were collectively awarded the King's Award for Voluntary Service in November 2023.

== See also ==
- Grade II* listed buildings in Lancashire
- Listed buildings in Morecambe
