= Morecambe =

Town in Lancashire, England

Coordinates: 54.073°N 2.870°W

- Town
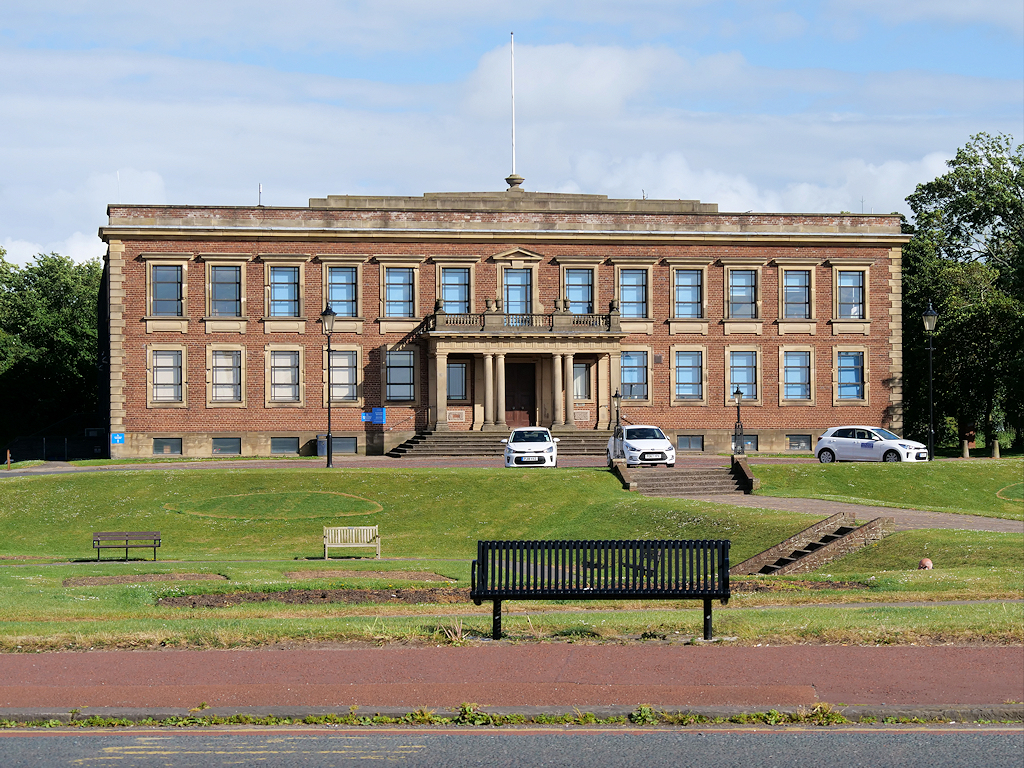
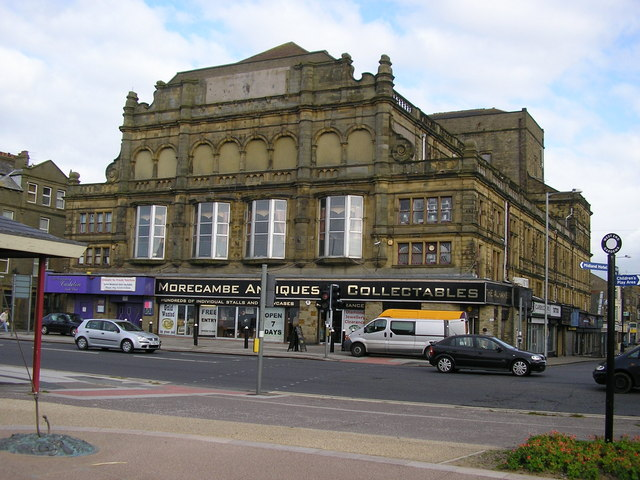
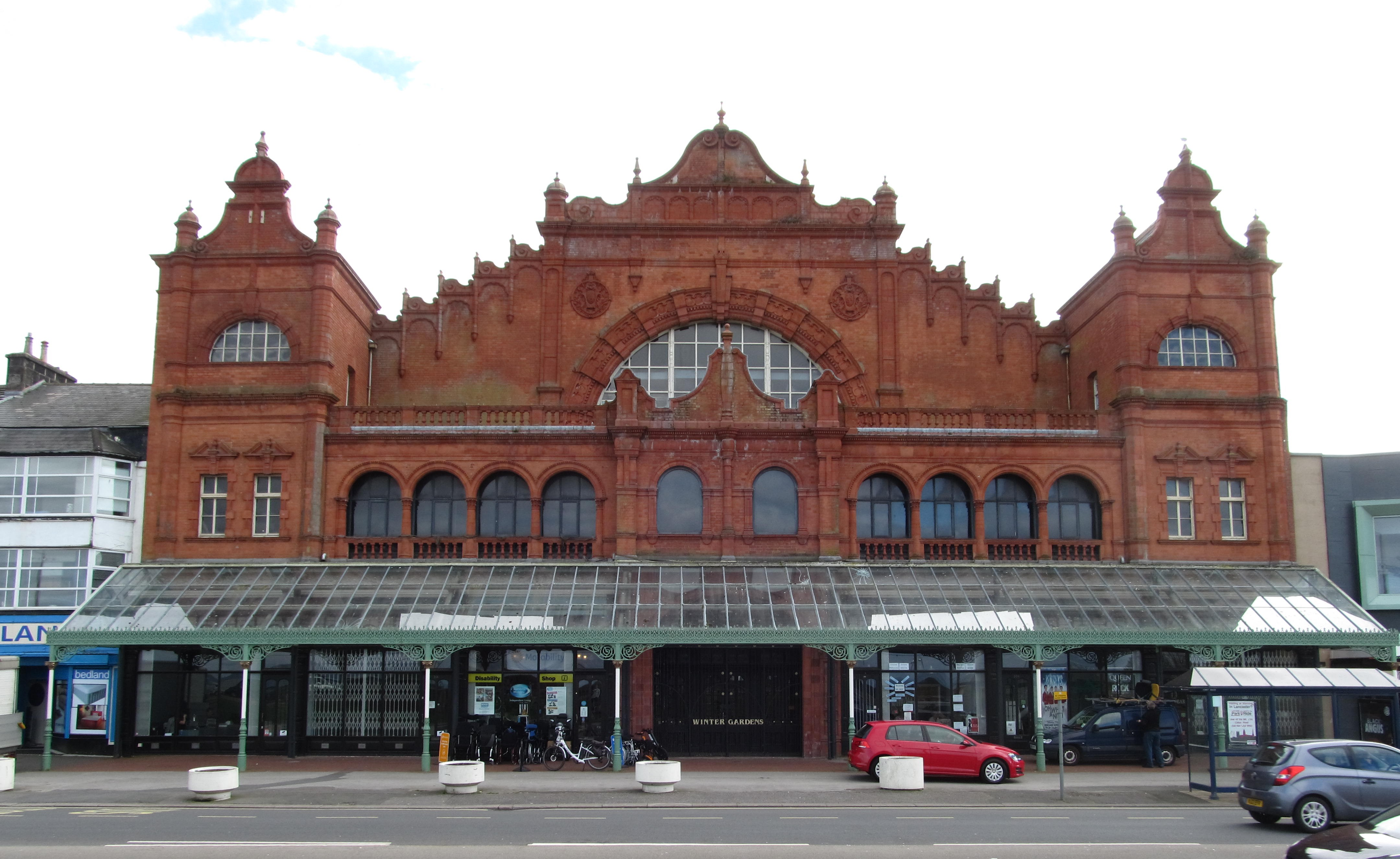
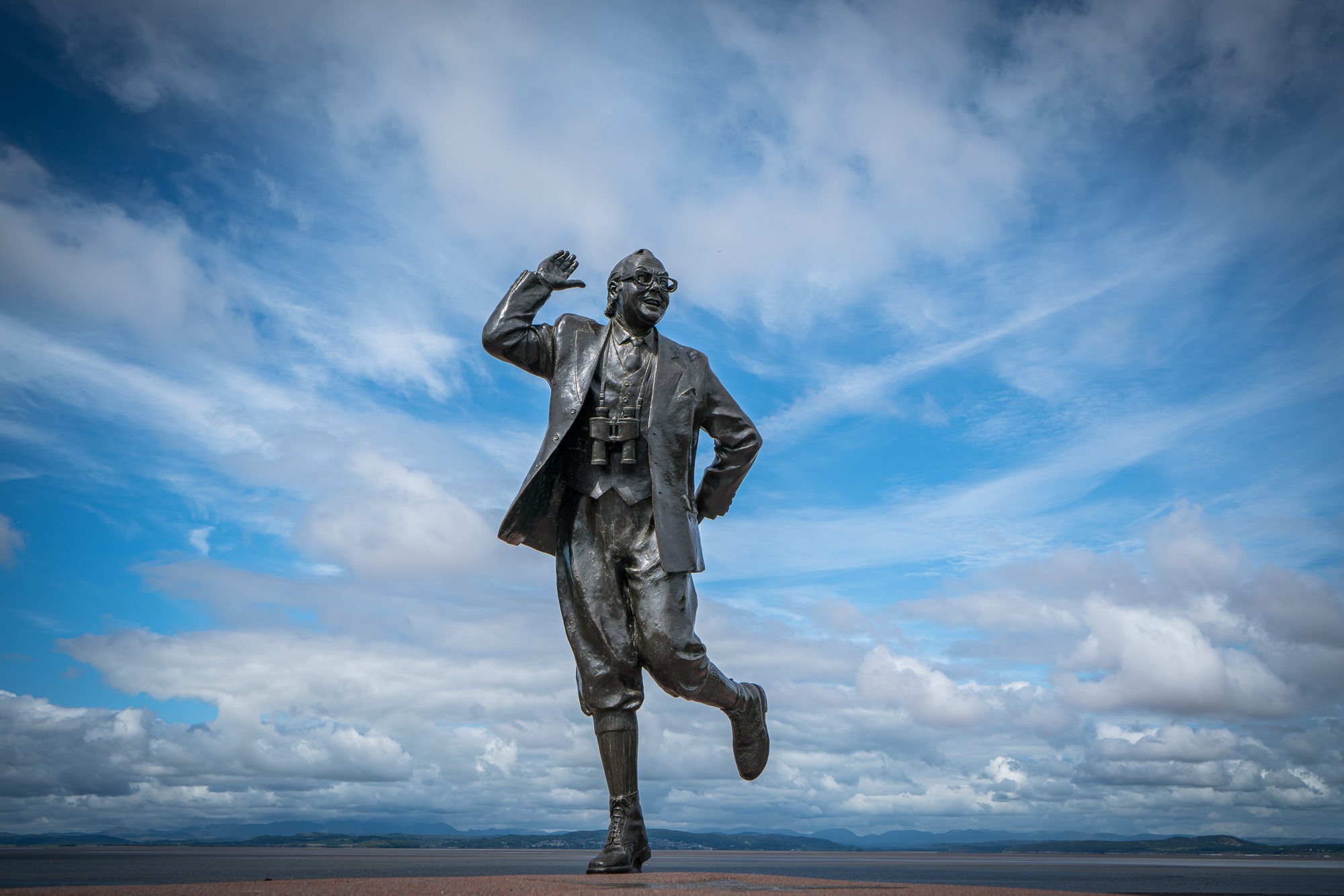
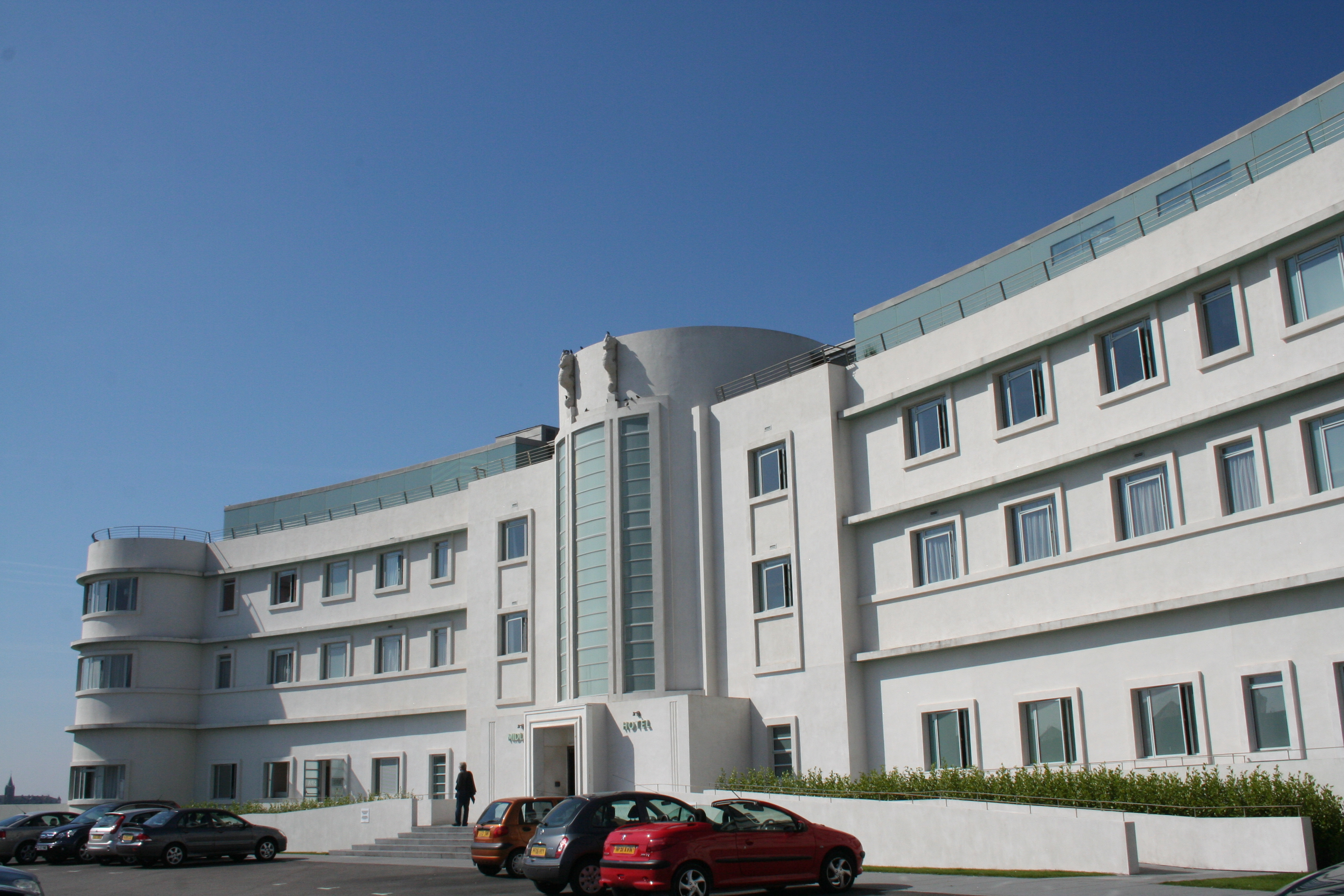
- Town Hall Alhambra Theatre The Winter Gardens Eric Morecambe Statue Midland Hotel

- Location in the City of Lancaster district Location of town centre in Morecambe Location on Morecambe Bay Location within Lancashire
- Population: 34,590 (2021)
- OS grid reference: SD425634
- Civil parish: Morecambe
- District: City of Lancaster
- Shire county: Lancashire
- Region: North West
- Country: England
- Sovereign state: United Kingdom
- Post town: Morecambe
- Postcode district: LA3, LA4
- Dialling code: 01524
- Police: Lancashire
- Fire: Lancashire
- Ambulance: North West
- UK Parliament: Morecambe and Lunesdale

Morecambe (/ˈmɔːrkəm/ MOR-kəm) is a seaside town and civil parish in the City of Lancaster district of Lancashire, England, on Morecambe Bay, part of the Irish Sea. In 2021, the parish had a population of 34,590.

== History ==
In 1846, the Morecambe Harbour and Railway Company was formed to build a harbour on Morecambe Bay, close to the fishing village of Poulton-le-Sands, and a connecting railway. By 1850, the railway linked to Skipton, Keighley and Bradford in the West Riding of Yorkshire, and a settlement began to grow around the harbour and railway to service the port and as a seaside resort. The settlement expanded to absorb Poulton and the villages of Bare and Torrisholme. The settlement started to be referred to as "Morecambe", possibly after the harbour and railway. In 1889, the new name was officially adopted.

Morecambe was a thriving seaside resort in the mid-20th century. It was home to the largest Pontins resort in the country. Pontins closed in 1993. While the resort of Blackpool attracted holiday-makers predominantly from the Lancashire mill towns, Morecambe had more visitors from Yorkshire (due to its railway connection) and Scotland. Mill workers from Bradford and further afield in West Yorkshire would holiday at Morecambe, with some retiring there. This gave Morecambe the nickname "Bradford on Sea". Between 1956 and 1989, it was the home of the Miss Great Britain beauty contest.

Morecambe suffered a decades-long decline after a series of incidents that damaged tourism and the local economy. Two piers were lost: West End Pier was partly washed away in a storm in November 1977, and the remnants were demolished in 1978; Central Pier, damaged by fire in 1933, was removed in 1992. In 1994, The World of Crinkley Bottom attraction in Happy Mount Park closed only thirteen weeks after opening. The ensuing Blobbygate scandal, a financial disaster after projected visitor numbers did not materialise, led to a legal battle between Lancaster City Council and TV star Noel Edmonds, costing North Lancashire taxpayers £2.6 million. The closures of Bubbles, Morecambe's swimming pool, and the Frontierland fairground soon followed. Tourism decline in Morecambe in the late 20th century was unusually spectacular, just as its boom had been earlier in the century. This decline was due to various factors, including competition from nearby Blackpool and other Lancastrian resorts.

Morecambe was selected by the RNLI as the location for its first active life-saving hovercraft. (Griffon 470SAR) H-002 "The Hurley Flyer", which became operational on 23 December 2002, was housed in a temporary garage next to the Yacht Club until a permanent building could be designed and built. Work on the latter began in 2008, and it officially opened on 12 June 2010.

On 5 February 2004, there was a major loss of life in Morecambe Bay when at least 21 Chinese immigrant shellfish harvesters were drowned after they became trapped by the incoming tide.

In December 2017, a local general practitioner and community health activist claimed that children in Morecambe were suffering from malnourishment and implied that cases of rickets had been observed as a consequence. The Morecambe Bay Clinical Commissioning Group subsequently sought to correct the GP's claims and clarified the etiology of vitamin D deficiency in the local population, explaining "rickets is a very rare condition and has multiple causes".

=== The "Morecambe Budget" ===
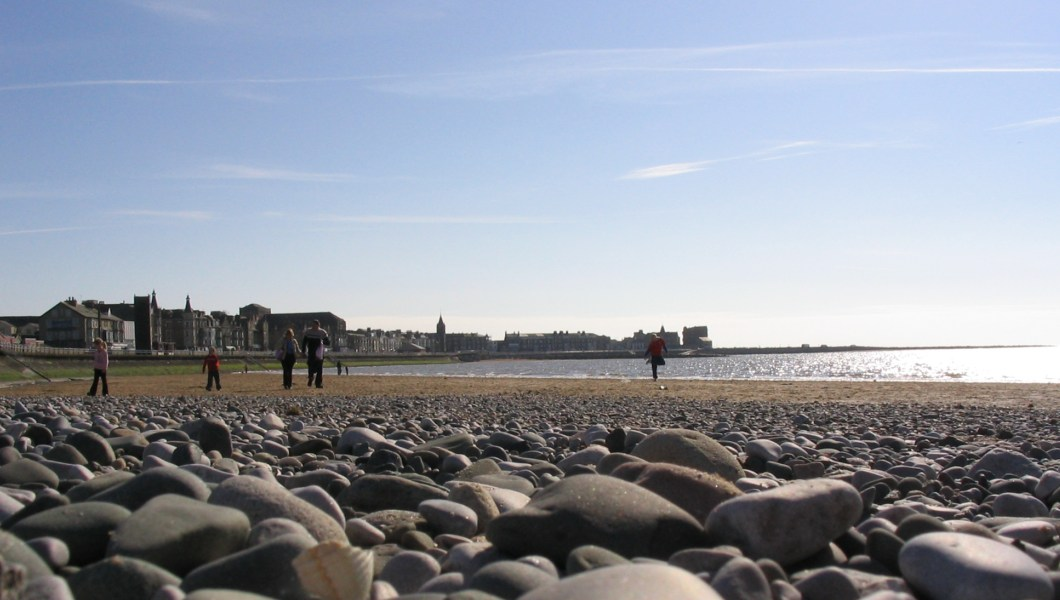
Morecambe Beach looking towards the West End

Enoch Powell made a speech in Morecambe on 11 October 1968 on the economy, setting out alternative, radical free-market policies that would later be called the Morecambe Budget. Powell used the financial year 1968–69 to show how income tax could be halved from 8s 3d to 4s 3d in the pound (basic rate cut from 41% to 21%) and how capital gains tax and Selective Employment Tax could be abolished without reducing expenditure on defence or the social services. These tax cuts required a saving of £2,855 million, and this would be funded by eradicating losses in the nationalised industries and denationalising the profit-making state concerns; ending all housing subsidies except for those who could not afford their own housing; ending all foreign aid; ending all grants and subsidies in agriculture; ending all assistance to development areas; ending all investment grants; abolishing the National Economic Development Council; and abolishing the Prices and Incomes Board The cuts in taxation would also allow the state to borrow from the public to spend on capital projects such as hospitals and roads and on the firm and humane treatment of criminals.

== Governance ==
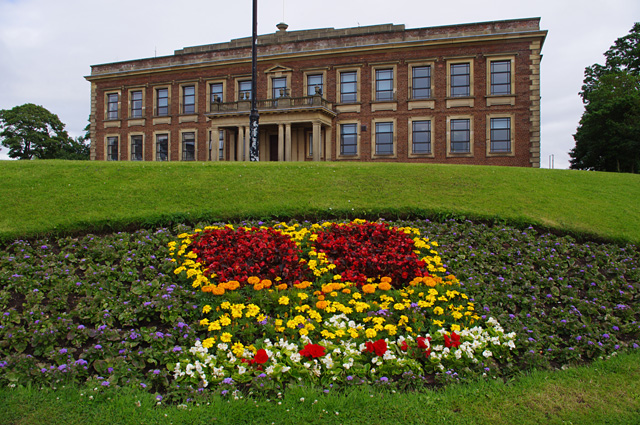
Morecambe Town Hall, completed in 1932

The town is in the Morecambe and Lunesdale parliamentary constituency; the member of parliament following the 2024 general election is Lizzi Collinge.

Before Brexit, it was in the North West England European Parliamentary constituency.

Morecambe is governed by three tiers of local government:

- Morecambe Town Council
- Lancaster City Council (district)
- Lancashire County Council

== Economy ==
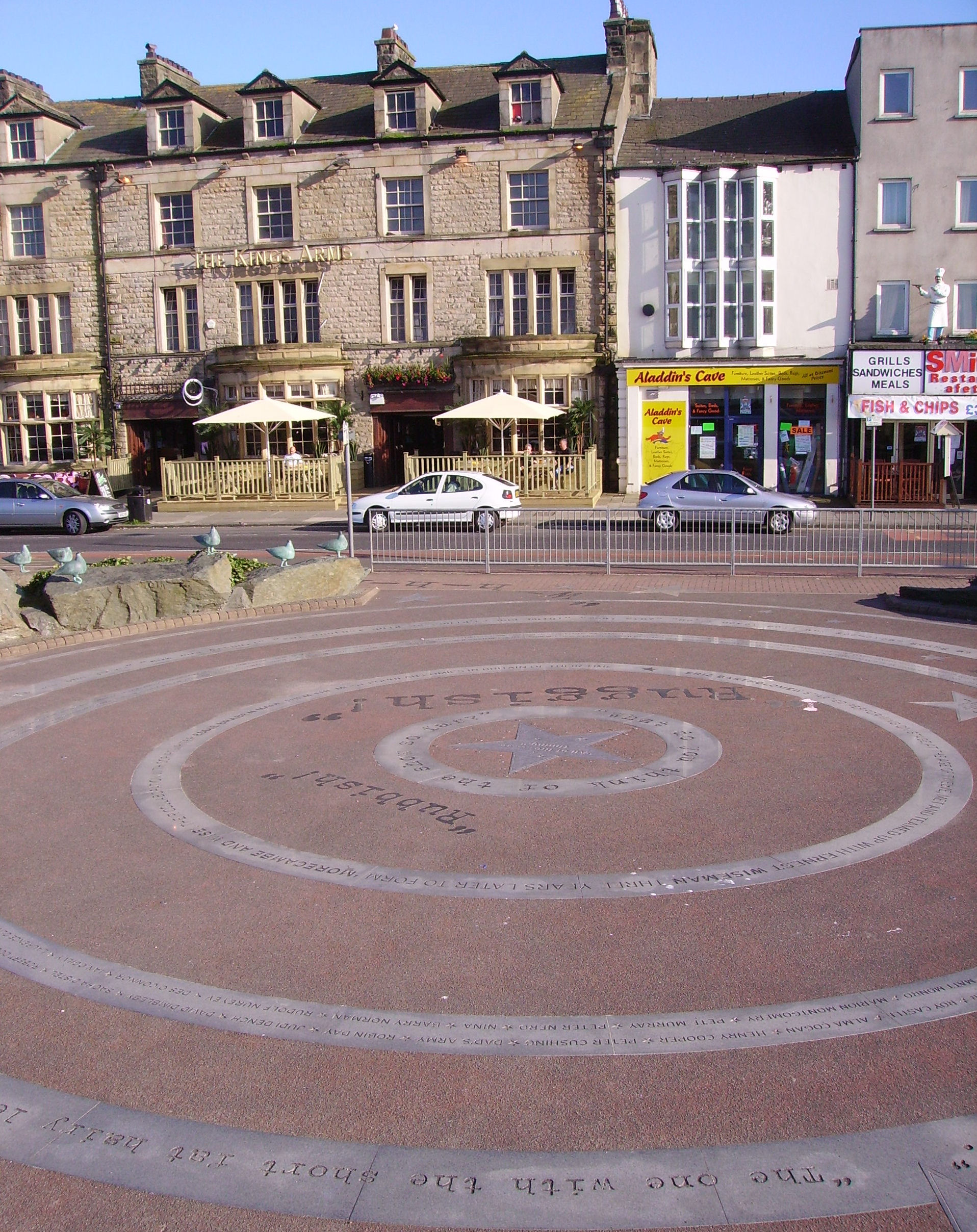
Morecambe Promenade

Morecambe's main central shopping area incorporates two markets—the Festival Market and the Morecambe Sunday Market—and the Reel Cinema complex.

=== Tourism ===
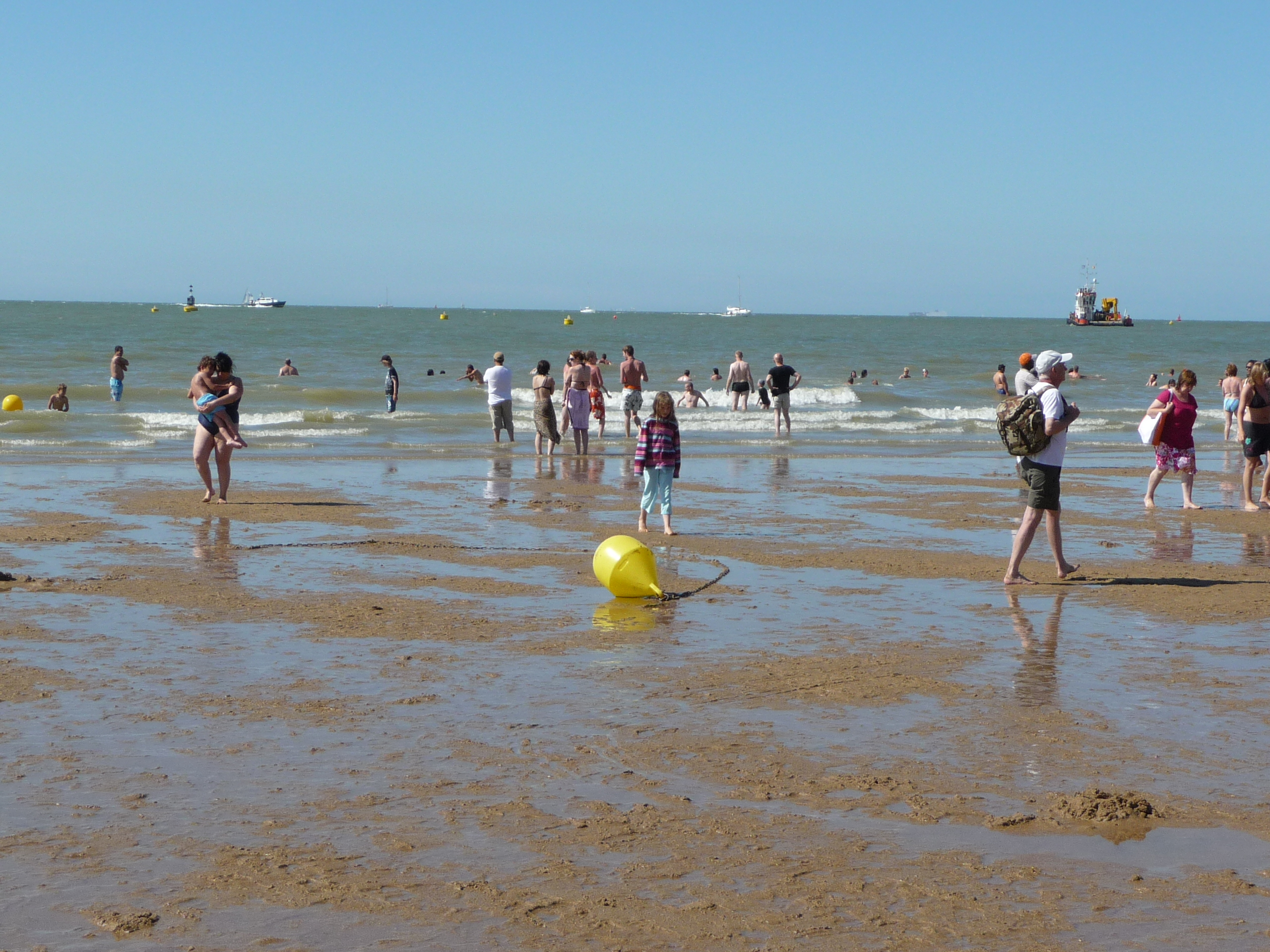
Morecambe Sands in summer

Morecambe Hotel and Tourism Association, which had forty members, has merged with the Bay Tourism Association. At a full meeting of the Morecambe Hotel and Tourism Association on Monday 8 March 2010, it was unanimously resolved that the MHTA would join with Bay Tourism to become one association under the name of the Bay Tourism Association and the MHTA would cease to operate as an association. The BTA works closely with Lancaster Chamber and organises joint promotional ventures with other tourism associations in the region. Recent tourism initiatives have made Morecambe a centre for bird watchers with the Tern Project enhancing the town's heritage linked to the extensive natural landscape of Morecambe Bay and its diverse wildlife.

=== Eden Project Morecambe ===
In 2018, the Eden Project revealed its design for the Eden Project North (later renamed Eden Project Morecambe) on the seafront in Morecambe. There will be biodomes shaped like mussels and a focus on the marine environment. Grimshaw are the architects for the £80 million project, which is a partnership with the Lancashire Enterprise Partnership, Lancaster University, Lancashire County Council and Lancaster City Council.

== Education ==
Morecambe is served by a number of primary, secondary and tertiary educational establishments. These include Morecambe Bay Academy, Bay Leadership Academy, Morecambe Road School and Lancaster and Morecambe College.

== Culture ==
=== Performing arts ===
Morecambe has two large live-music venues: the Platform and More Music. The Platform is a converted Victorian-styled building which used to be the old railway station. It also houses the Morecambe Tourist Information Centre. Morecambe has a number of bands playing in the town's pubs and music venues.

Morecambe is home to community music charity More Music. More Music was established in 1993 and is based in the Hothouse. The Hothouse is now a venue for live gigs.

=== Morecambe and Alan Bennett ===
The Yorkshire playwright and author Alan Bennett has enjoyed a long association with Morecambe and has often referred to the town in his work and writing. One of his early TV plays, Sunset Across the Bay (1975), is about a couple from Leeds who retire to Morecambe, leaving their old home with the words "Bye bye, mucky Leeds!" He based the play on memories of the many holidays he spent in Morecambe with his parents. In his essay "Written on the Body", collected in Untold Stories (2005), he even suggests that his association with the town is pre-natal: "[I]t had been in a boarding house that I was conceived, sometime over the August Bank Holiday of 1933 at Morecambe or Filey." In the same collection, Bennett pays tribute to the Morecambe-born actress Thora Hird in the essays Last of the Sun, about the final play he wrote for her, and "Thora Hird 1911–2003", a memoir of the work they had done together since the 1960s. Earlier in the book, he discusses his maternal aunt Kathleen, who married in Morecambe and lived there until her death in 1974.

=== Art ===
Morecambe was the birthplace of the artist William Woodhouse (1857–1939), who lived all his life in the town and is buried with his wife and daughter at St. Peter's Church in the village of Heysham, a little to the south of Morecambe.

=== Youth and community ===
Stanley's Youth and Community Centre is based on Stanley Road in the West End of Morecambe. It offers the opportunity for young people aged 8–18 to play music, cook or just use the facilities to catch up with friends. There are also community sessions including community meal, women's group and 'Get Connected' information service.

The Exchange, which was set up in 2015 and is based on West Street in the West End of Morecambe, is a Community Arts CIC, offering free creative workshops to local residents. Promoting creativity as a means of well-being, it serves as a non-profit welcome space for all ages and abilities. In addition to workshops, The Exchange sells the artwork of local residents and hosts events such as the popular Soup Night.

=== Cuisine ===
Morecambe Bay Potted shrimps are a well known local delicacy throughout the country and were a favourite dish of Queen Elizabeth II. Boiled in butter with a variety of spices until they are tender, when cooked they are sealed into pots.

=== Baylight ===
Baylight is an annual event established in 2023, with a trail of illuminated artworks on the Promenade for two nights in February and an associated parade. The 2025 event was supported by financial contributions from both Lancaster City Council and Lancashire County Council. It was estimated that the 2024 event brought 28,000 visitors to Morecambe, who spend £460,000 in the town.

== Landmarks ==
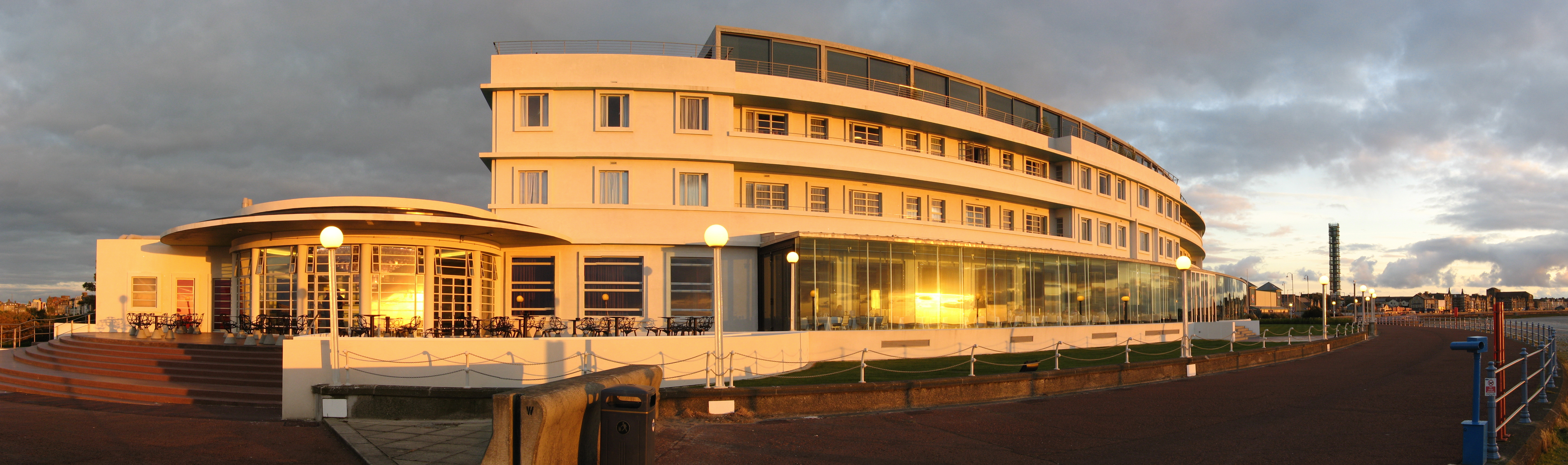
Midland Hotel in 2008 after restoration

The Midland Hotel is an art deco hotel on the seafront. It contains interior design and art pieces by artist Eric Gill. In 2009 it underwent a £7 million restoration, headed by Manchester company Urban Splash. The hotel re-opened for business in June 2008. In March 2011 the freehold of the building was sold by Urban Splash to the Lancaster Foundation.

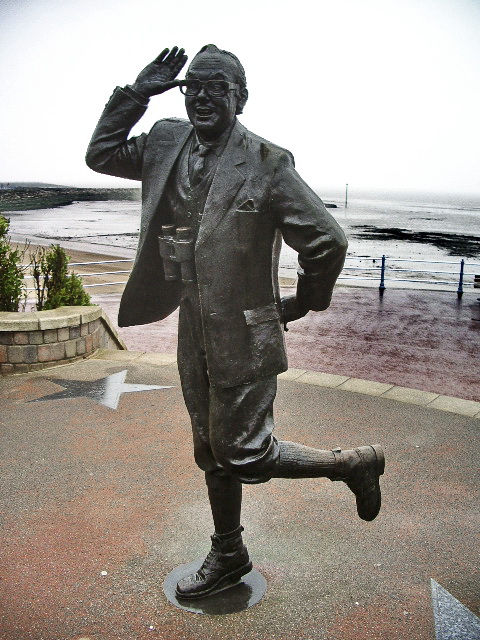
The statue in 2008

Overlooking Morecambe Bay is a Statue of Eric Morecambe by Graham Ibbeson. The bronze sculpture commemorating Eric Morecambe (1926–1984), who was born in the town, was unveiled by Queen Elizabeth II in July 1999. One of Morecambe's landmark buildings is the partially renovated Victoria Pavilion or Morecambe Winter Gardens which once housed a swimming pool, a theatre, a restaurant, and a ballroom.

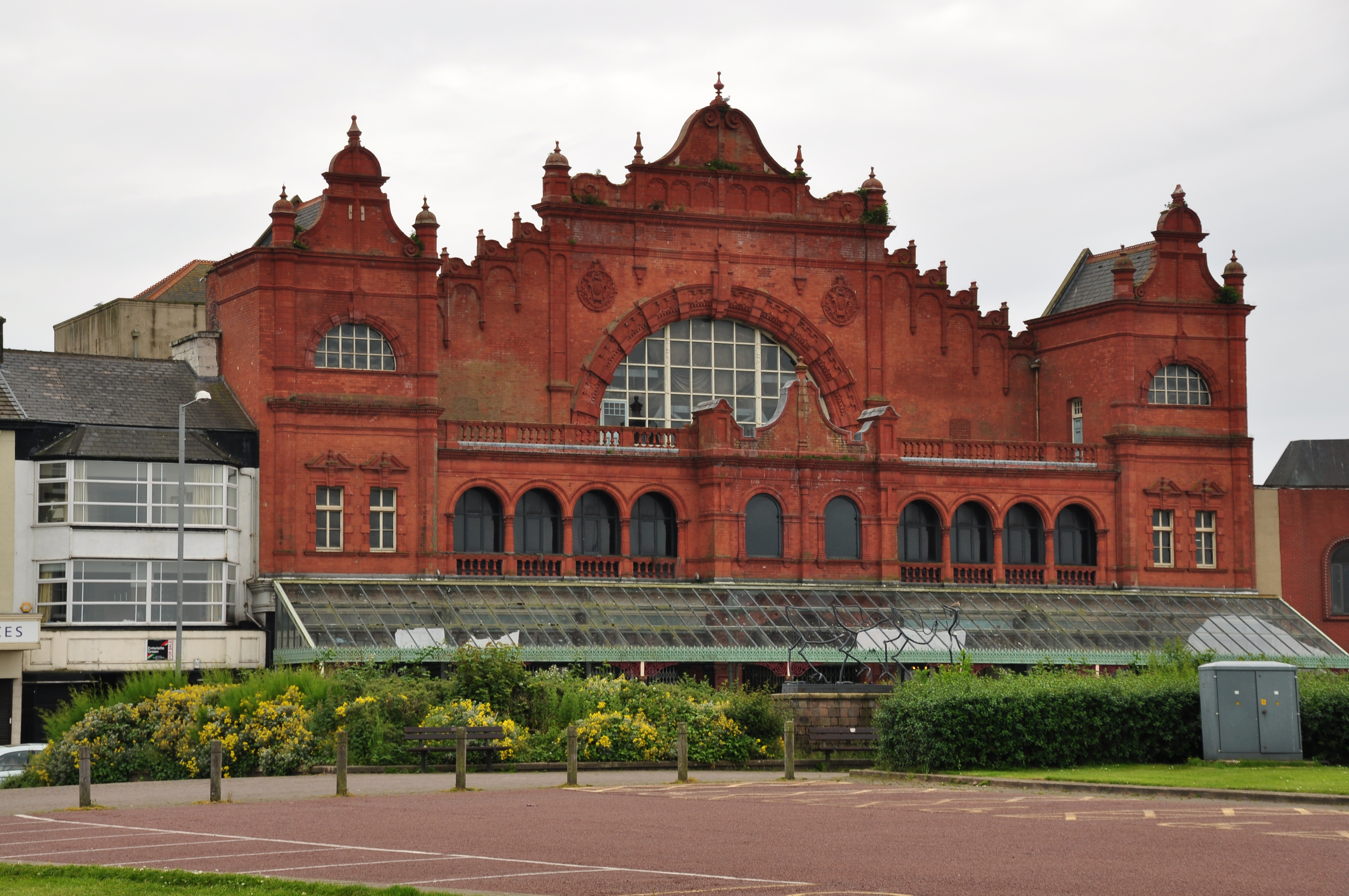
The Winter Gardens

Replacing the 1928 Victoria Street library, a new library designed by the architect firm of Roger Booth was opened in 1967. Earlier proposals to build a library in Morecambe with Carnegie funding had stalled due to arguments about the rates involved. The library is mentioned by Pevsner and is one of the few noteworthy buildings, other than churches, that are not connected to the seaside trade. The building is formed by hexagons, with a hyperbolic parabolic roof, creating a distinctive skyline and interior.

Two fairgrounds existed in the town: a small one to the north of the railway station, which closed down in the 1980s, and a larger one to the south of the station, which ultimately became Frontierland and closed in 1999. The last remaining landmark on the site was the Polo Tower, left standing only because of the contract for the phone mast on top. In July 2008, the local council ordered a clean-up of the Polo Tower, and it was demolished in July 2017.

Near the promenade is the Morecambe and Heysham War Memorial commemorating the men of Morecambe who lost their lives in the two world wars and the Korean War. The memorial differs from most as it lists the First World War as 1914 to 1919 rather than 1914 to 1918.

In March 2019, a Time and Tide Bell designed by Marcus Vergette was installed beside the Stone Jetty as part of a national public art project.

== Sports ==
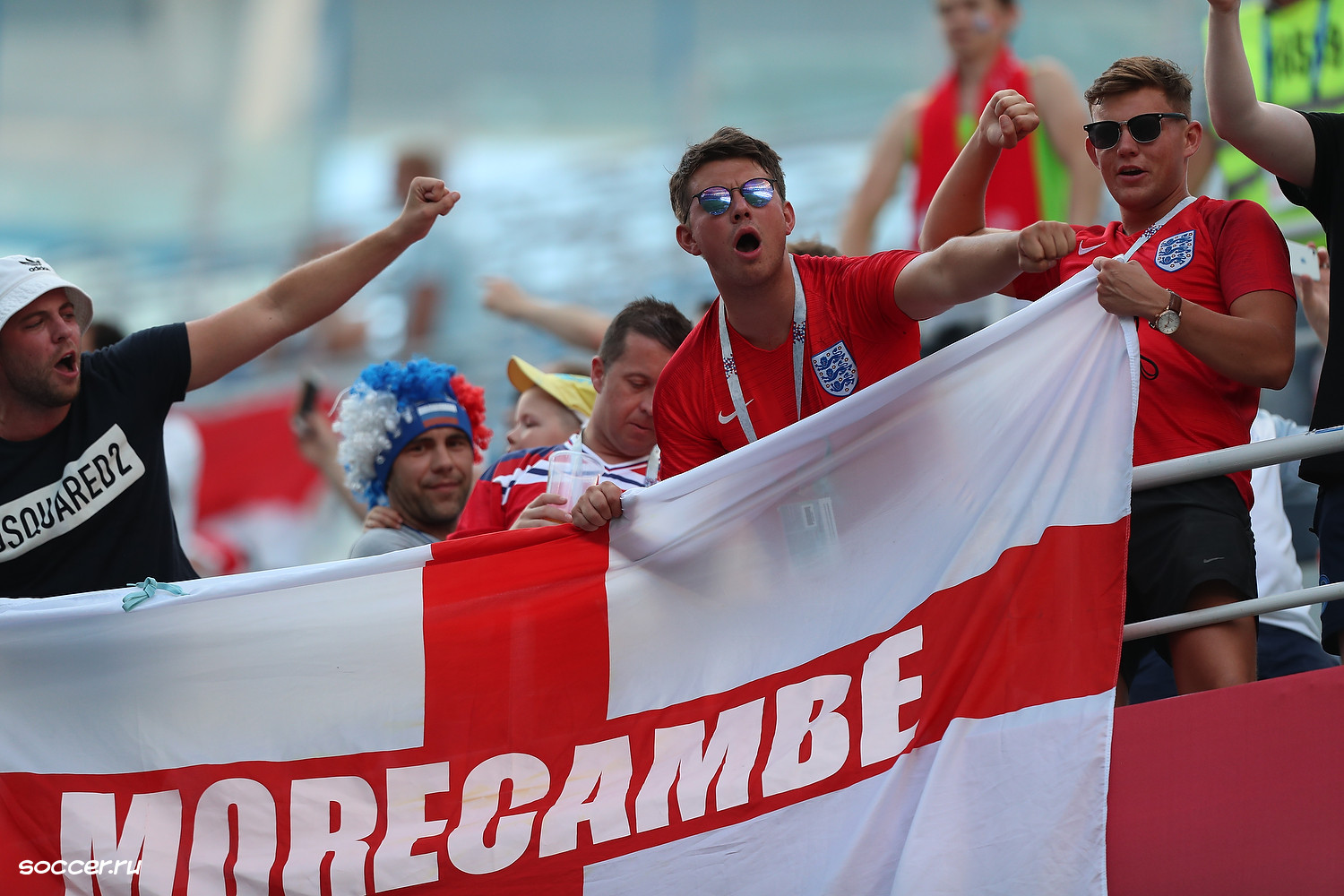
Morecambe football fans at the 2018 FIFA World Cup in Russia

On 20 May 2007, Morecambe F.C. (known as 'the Shrimps') won the Conference National playoffs to earn promotion to the Football League for the first time in their history. They had a successful first season in the Football League and in the 2009–10 season they reached the play-offs, only to lose 7–2 on aggregate to eventual winners Dagenham & Redbridge. At the end of the 2009–10 season the club moved from Christie Park to a new home, the Globe Arena. The old stadium was demolished to make way for a Sainsbury's supermarket. On 31 May 2021, Morecambe won the League Two play-off final at Wembley Stadium, beating Newport County 1–0 after extra time to win promotion to League One for the first time in their history. They were relegated back to League Two in 2023, and, two seasons later, they were relegated again, bringing their 18-year stay in the EFL to an end. Set to play in the National League for the 2025–26 season, they were briefly suspended from the competition in July 2025 due to financial and ownership issues.

When the rugby football schism occurred in 1895, the now defunct team of Morecambe RFC joined the Northern Rugby Football Union (now Rugby Football League) in its second season. Morecambe played for eight of the ten seasons from the 1896–97 season through to the end of 1905–06 season. Morecambe finished 14th of 14 in its first three seasons of the Lancashire Senior Competition, withdrew for the 1899–1900 and 1900–01 seasons, finished 11th of 13 in the Lancashire Senior Competition, then finished 17th of 18, 16th of 17, 13th of 14 in Division-2, and finally 30th of 31 in the recombined league, after which Morecambe withdrew from the Northern Rugby Football Union. The town still hosts a rugby league team, with Heysham Atoms playing from their Trimpell Sports and Social Club base. The Atoms finished joint top of division three in the North West Counties in 2012.

World Heavyweight Boxing Champion Tyson Fury used to live in Morecambe but is now resident on the Isle of Man. He still owns a gym in the town. Morecambe is also home to Commonwealth Featherweight Champion, Isaac Lowe, who beat Marco McCullough in the 8th round with in one minute and 56 seconds on the Frampton Vs Quigg Under-card.

A 5 km parkrun event takes place every Saturday morning on the Promenade. The first event was held in April 2019.

== Transport ==
=== Rail ===
Railway station
Site of former railway station

The present-day Morecambe station opened in 1994, replacing an older station once known as Morecambe Promenade, built by the Midland Railway on its North Western Line from Skipton in Yorkshire. A former station at Morecambe Euston Road, built by the rival London & North Western Railway, was closed in 1963. Regular rail services are provided to and from Lancaster, with some trains running direct from Preston and Leeds. Trains also run to Heysham, where they connect with the ferry service to the Isle of Man. A further railway station, Bare Lane, serves the suburb of Bare. As of 2021 Northern Trains were given a contract by the Department for Transport to run services for three years, with an optional extension of a further two years. The contract was updated in 2022, to run until 1 March 2025.

=== Bus ===
Bus services in the area are operated mainly by Stagecoach Cumbria & North Lancashire & other local companies. Direct services link the town with Windermere and Bowness-on-Windermere via Carnforth, Milnthorpe and Kendal (755), Lancaster with connections to Keswick via Carnforth, Milnthorpe, Kendal, Windermere, Ambleside and Grasmere.

== Morecambe in popular culture ==
- Morecambe and the neighbouring village of Heysham are the setting of the Cthulhu Mythos novel The Weird Shadow over Morecambe, published by the writer Edmund Glasby in 2014. The title of the book is a reference to H.P. Lovecraft's story "The Shadow over Innsmouth", which is also set in a seaside town.
- The ITV series, The Bay, is set and filmed in Morecambe. Series 1 was first aired in March 2019 and Series 2 was first aired in January 2021. Series 3, filmed in and around Morecambe, was first aired in January 2022.
- Morecambe is the setting for the first half of Sarah Hall's book, The Electric Michelangelo.
- The 1960 kitchen sink drama The Entertainer, starring Laurence Olivier, was filmed extensively in Morecambe.
- Playwright John Osborne wrote the play Look Back in Anger over 17 days on a deckchair on Morecambe's Central Pier while performing in the resort.
- The playwright Alan Bennett visited the resort frequently as a child and became the setting for two of his television plays, both produced by Stephen Frears. The first was Sunset Across The Bay, a 1975 Play for Today, a story of a couple who move to Morecambe from Leeds and struggle to adapt to retirement. The second was All Day On The Sands (1979), the final instalment of London Weekend Television's Six Plays by Alan Bennett.
- The comedian and writer Victoria Wood lived in Morecambe in the late 1970s with her husband, the comedian and magician Geoffrey Durham. While living in the resort she won ITV's New Faces and wrote her breakthrough television play Talent. The actor Julie Walters was a regular visitor and they derived the 'Two Soups' sketch from their frequent visits to Lubins cafe on Morecambe promenade.
- Victoria Wood also devised the TV play Eric and Ernie, where she played the role of Eric Morecambe's mother Sadie. The programme was partly filmed in Morecambe.
- The Midland Hotel in Morecambe was the setting for a 2002 episode of Poirot called 'Double Sin'. Morecambe poses as the fictional town of Whitcombe.
- The TV documentaries about the Radford family are filmed in Morecambe where the family live and own a bakery.
- The 2021 Netflix thriller miniseries Stay Close, starring James Nesbitt, filmed scenes on Morecambe promenade.

== Notable people ==
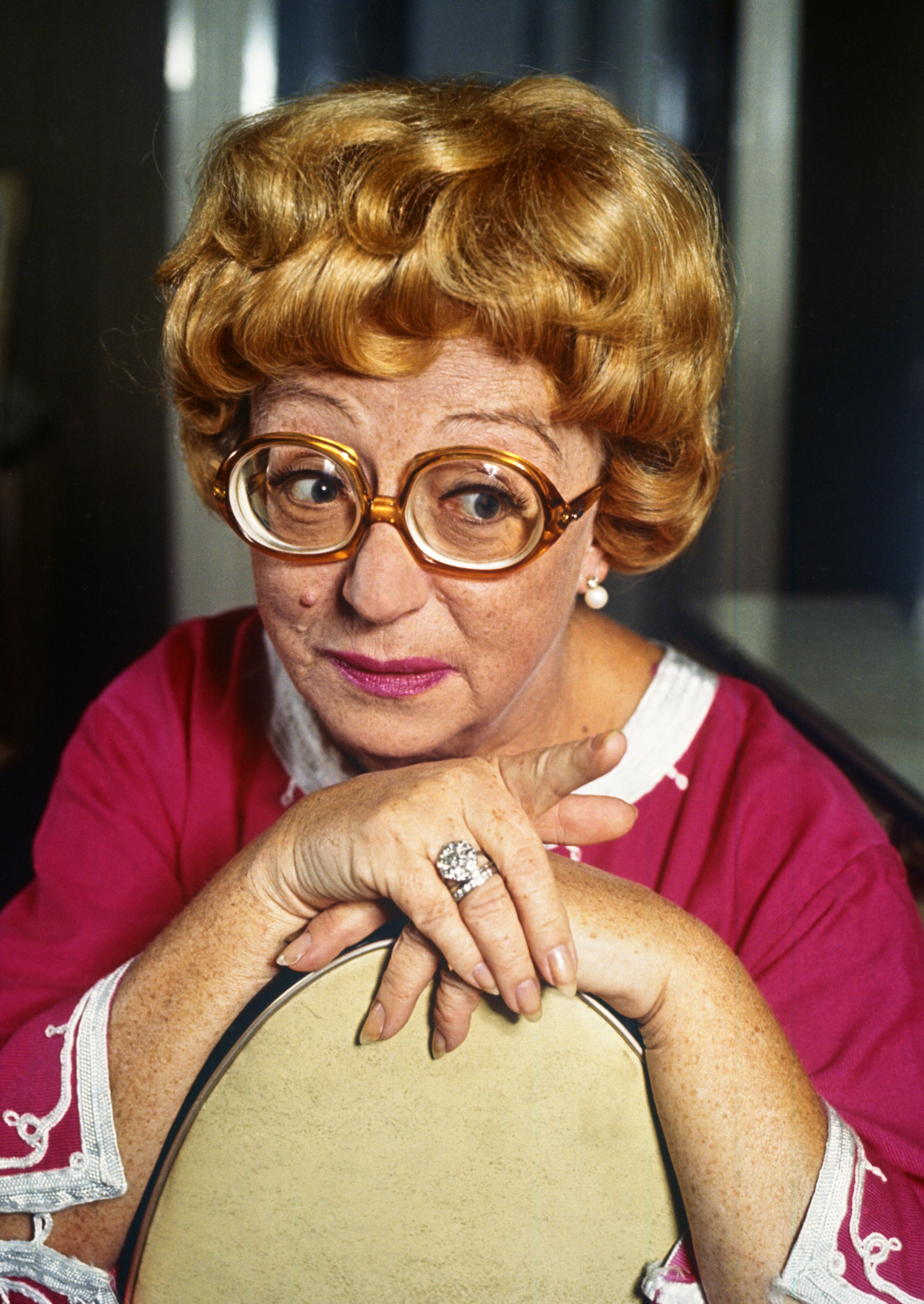
Dame Thora Hird 1974

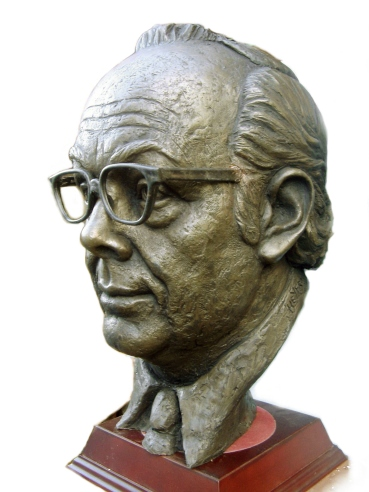
Eric Morecambe, 1963

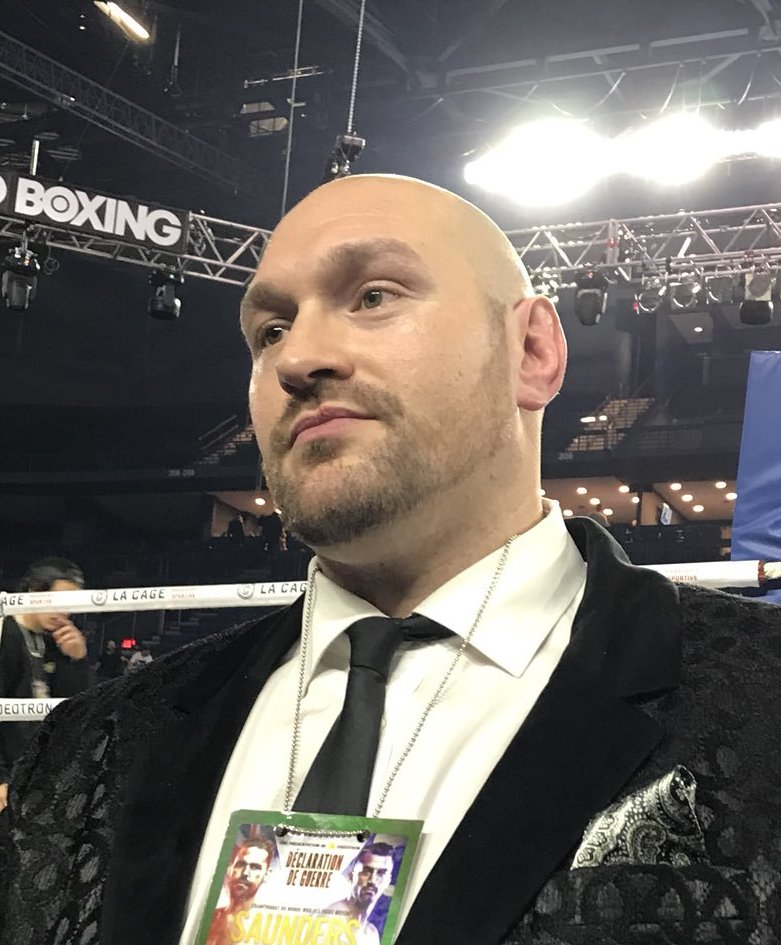
Tyson Fury, 2017

- Albert Modley (1901–1979), English variety entertainer and comedian
- Janette Scott (born 1938), actress
- Dame Thora Hird (1911–2003), actress
- Eric Morecambe (1926–1984), comedian, took his stage name from the town's name
- Patrick Kelly (born 1938), Roman Catholic Archbishop of Liverpool, 1996–2013
- Helen Worth (born 1951), actress, portrayed Gail Platt in the ITV soap opera Coronation Street
- Sir Peter John Ratcliffe (born 1954), physician-scientist, trained as a nephrologist
- Wayne Hemingway (born 1961), designer, founder of Red or Dead and Northern Soul DJ
- Geraldine Smith (born 1961), politician, MP for Morecambe and Lunesdale, 1997 to 2010
- Paul Hayes (born 1970), antiques expert, TV personality
- Busta Rhymes (born 1972), rapper, lived there for some time as a child with his aunt
- Cherylee Houston (born 1974), actress, Izzy Armstrong in Coronation Street
- Emma Atkins (born 1975), actress, Charity Dingle in Emmerdale
- Lisa O'Hare (born 1983), actress
- The Heartbreaks (2009–2015), alternative rock band

=== Sport ===
- Joe Walton (1881–1962), footballer, played 211 games
- Jack Bartholomew (1888–1965), rugby league footballer, played 309 games
- Jamie McGowan (born 1970), footballer, played over 310 games in the Scottish leagues
- John McGuinness (born 1972), motorcycle racer, specialist at the Isle of Man TT
- Dave Chisnall (born 1980), professional darts player with the PDC, lives in Morecambe
- Graham Hicks (born 1985), an English strongman and powerlifter
- Garry Hunter (born 1985), footballer who played 277 games for Morecambe
- Tyson Fury (born 1988), boxer (World Heavyweight Champion 2015–2016, 2020–2024) lived in Morecambe
- Isaac Lowe (born 1994), Commonwealth Featherweight boxing champion

== Climate ==
Climate data for Morecambe No. 2 (Note: Weather station is located 3 miles (5 km) from the Lancaster city centre.), elevation: 3 m (10 ft), 1991–2020 normals, extremes 1924–present
Month	Jan	Feb	Mar	Apr	May	Jun	Jul	Aug	Sep	Oct	Nov	Dec	Year
Record high °C (°F)	13.9 (57.0)	16.6 (61.9)	22.2 (72.0)	23.9 (75.0)	27.7 (81.9)	31.7 (89.1)	36.3 (97.3)	32.7 (90.9)	28.7 (83.7)	26.3 (79.3)	17.9 (64.2)	15.2 (59.4)	36.3 (97.3)
Mean daily maximum °C (°F)	7.2 (45.0)	7.6 (45.7)	9.5 (49.1)	12.4 (54.3)	15.7 (60.3)	18.0 (64.4)	19.7 (67.5)	19.3 (66.7)	17.3 (63.1)	13.9 (57.0)	10.2 (50.4)	7.8 (46.0)	13.2 (55.8)
Daily mean °C (°F)	5.0 (41.0)	5.1 (41.2)	6.7 (44.1)	9.1 (48.4)	12.1 (53.8)	14.8 (58.6)	16.6 (61.9)	16.3 (61.3)	14.2 (57.6)	11.0 (51.8)	7.8 (46.0)	5.3 (41.5)	10.3 (50.5)
Mean daily minimum °C (°F)	2.8 (37.0)	2.7 (36.9)	3.8 (38.8)	5.8 (42.4)	8.6 (47.5)	11.6 (52.9)	13.5 (56.3)	13.3 (55.9)	11.1 (52.0)	8.2 (46.8)	5.3 (41.5)	2.9 (37.2)	7.5 (45.5)
Record low °C (°F)	−13.3 (8.1)	−8.3 (17.1)	−7.8 (18.0)	−4.3 (24.3)	−0.6 (30.9)	2.5 (36.5)	4.4 (39.9)	4.9 (40.8)	0.6 (33.1)	−4.4 (24.1)	−6.5 (20.3)	−9.4 (15.1)	−13.3 (8.1)
Average precipitation mm (inches)	98.0 (3.86)	84.2 (3.31)	69.5 (2.74)	52.0 (2.05)	60.5 (2.38)	68.5 (2.70)	84.8 (3.34)	98.2 (3.87)	101.0 (3.98)	112.4 (4.43)	113.3 (4.46)	118.1 (4.65)	1,060.3 (41.74)
Average precipitation days (≥ 1.0 mm)	15.4	12.2	12.4	10.1	10.4	10.3	12.0	13.3	12.1	14.6	16.3	16.0	154.9
Mean monthly sunshine hours	50.6	81.0	123.3	172.8	216.8	200.5	176.4	182.9	144.4	101.8	63.2	45.0	1,558.6
Source 1: Met Office
Source 2: Starlings Roost Weather

== See also ==
- Listed buildings in Morecambe
