= Mid Bedfordshire District Council elections =

Local government elections in Bedfordshire, England

Mid Bedfordshire was a non-metropolitan district in Bedfordshire, England. It was abolished on 1 April 2009 and replaced by Central Bedfordshire.

== Political control ==
The first election to the council was held in 1973, initially operating as a shadow authority alongside the outgoing authorities before coming into its powers on 1 April 1974. Political control of the council from 1974 until its abolition in 2009 was as follows:

Party in control	Years
No overall control	1974-1976
Conservative	1976-1995
No overall control	1995-1999
Conservative	1999–2009

=== Leadership ===
The last leader of the council was Tricia Turner, a Conservative. She went on to be the first leader of Central Bedfordshire Council.

Councillor	Party	From	To
Tricia Turner	Conservative		31 Mar 2009

== Council elections ==
- 1973 Mid Bedfordshire District Council election
- 1976 Mid Bedfordshire District Council election
- 1979 Mid Bedfordshire District Council election (New ward boundaries)
- 1983 Mid Bedfordshire District Council election
- 1987 Mid Bedfordshire District Council election (District boundary changes took place but the number of seats remained the same)
- 1991 Mid Bedfordshire District Council election (District boundary changes took place but the number of seats remained the same)
- 1995 Mid Bedfordshire District Council election
- 1999 Mid Bedfordshire District Council election
- 2003 Mid Bedfordshire District Council election (New ward boundaries)
- 2007 Mid Bedfordshire District Council election

== Results maps ==
2003 results map

2007 results map

== By-election results ==
=== 1995-1999 ===
Cranfield By-Election 17 October 1996
Party	Candidate	Votes	%	±%
Conservative	Yvonne Fitzgerald-Finch	329	27.4	
Labour		299	24.9	
Independent		298	24.8	
Liberal Democrats		276	22.9	
Majority		30	2.5	
Turnout		1,202	33.7	
Conservative gain from Independent		Swing		

=== 1999-2003 ===
Sandy All Saints By-Election 3 March 2000
Party	Candidate	Votes	%	±%
Conservative	Valerie Caldicott	346	58.1	+21.3
Liberal Democrats		127	21.3	+21.3
Labour		123	20.7	+1.7
Majority		219	36.8	
Turnout		596	20.3	
Conservative gain from Independent		Swing		

Clifton & Henlow By-Election 8 June 2000
Party	Candidate	Votes	%	±%
Conservative	Anthony Rogers	876	53.4	+11.6
Liberal Democrats		646	39.4	+2.4
Labour		119	7.3	−12.4
Majority		230	14.0	
Turnout		1,641	37.5	
Conservative hold		Swing		

Ampthill By-Election 7 June 2001
Party	Candidate	Votes	%	±%
Liberal Democrats	Gary Summerfield	2,322	64.7	+20.8
Conservative		1,269	35.3	−1.3
Majority		856	29.4	
Turnout		3,591		
Liberal Democrats hold		Swing		

Blunham By-Election 7 June 2001
Party	Candidate	Votes	%	±%
Conservative	Joanna Davison	unopposed		
Conservative hold		Swing		

Biggleswade Stratton By-Election 4 July 2002
Party	Candidate	Votes	%	±%
Conservative	David Smith	696	39.9	+0.8
Liberal Democrats		544	31.2	+11.0
Labour		504	28.9	−11.8
Majority		152	8.7	
Turnout		1,744	27.8	
Conservative gain from Labour		Swing		

=== 2003-2007 ===
Biggleswade Ivel By-Election 12 February 2004
Party	Candidate	Votes	%	±%
Conservative	Wendy Smith	922	41.1	−1.7
Labour	Bernard Briars	652	29.0	−10.4
Liberal Democrats	Stephen Hartwell	535	23.8	+6.0
Green	Royston Swarbrooke	137	6.1	+6.1
Majority		270	12.1	
Turnout		2,246	40.2	
Conservative hold		Swing		

Houghton Haynes Southill and Old Warden By-Election 12 February 2004
Party	Candidate	Votes	%	±%
Conservative	Simon Gillett	803	52.0	
Liberal Democrats	Marcus Tyler	634	41.1	
Green	Oliver Campbell	107	6.9	
Majority		169	10.9	
Turnout		1,544	49.5	
Conservative hold		Swing		

Flitwick East By-Election 22 July 2004
Party	Candidate	Votes	%	±%
Liberal Democrats	Stephen Mitchell	522	49.6	+13.7
Conservative	Victor Lee	378	35.8	+8.7
Green	Marina Torselli	82	7.8	−7.8
Labour	Ida Neale	71	6.7	−14.6
Majority		144	13.8	
Turnout		1,053	25.4	
Liberal Democrats hold		Swing		

Houghton Haynes Southill & Old Warden By-Election 16 March 2006
Party	Candidate	Votes	%	±%
Liberal Democrats	Anthony Baines	741	55.3	
Conservative	Angela Barker	555	41.4	
Labour	Laurence Pollock	44	3.3	
Majority		186	13.9	
Turnout		1,340	42.5	
Liberal Democrats gain from Conservative		Swing		

=== 2007-2011 ===
Flitwick East By-Election 1 May 2008
Party	Candidate	Votes	%	±%
Liberal Democrats	Les Thompson	682	43.6	−14.6
Conservative	Andrew Turner	668	42.7	+0.9
Independent	Roy Storey	119	7.6	+7.6
Green	Chris Fyer	95	6.1	+6.1
Majority		14	0.9	
Turnout		1,564	36.1	
Liberal Democrats hold		Swing		
