= Mid Bedfordshire =

Mid Bedfordshire may refer to two places in England:

- Mid Bedfordshire (district), abolished 2009
- Mid Bedfordshire (UK Parliament constituency)
