= 1976 Mid Bedfordshire District Council election =

Election in Mid Bedfordshire, England

← 1973	May 1976	1979 →

All 49 seats to whole Council 25 seats needed for a majority
- Registered: 64,818
- Turnout: 62%
	First party	Second party	Third party
Party	Conservative	Independent	Labour
Seats won	30	14	3
Popular vote	13,973	7,733	8,276
Percentage	43.3%	24.0%	25.7%
	Fourth party	Fifth party
Party	Liberal	Ind. Conservative
Seats won	1	1
Popular vote	1,757	509
Percentage	5.4%	1.6%
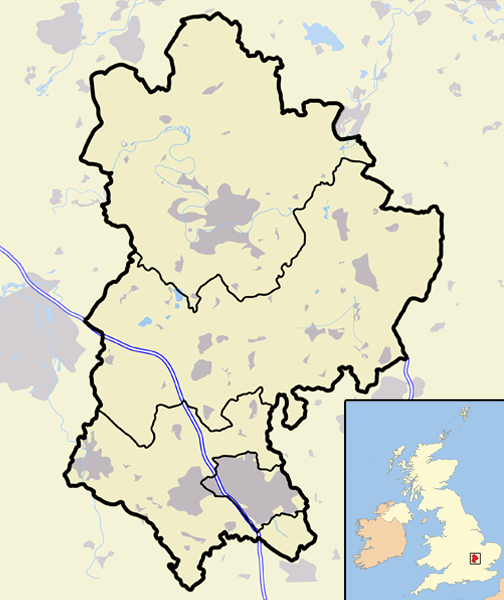
- Locations of wards in Mid Bedfordshire

Elections to Mid Bedfordshire District Council in Mid Bedfordshire, England, were held in May 1976. All 53 seats were up for election.

== Result ==
Gains and losses in the results table are compared with the 1973 district council election.

Mid Bedfordshire District Council Election Result 1976
Party	Seats	Gains	Losses	Net gain/loss	Seats %	Votes %	Votes	+/−
Conservative	30			+13	61.2	43.3	13,973	+19.7
Independent	14			-7	28.6	24.0	7,733	-19.0
Labour	3			-6	6.1	25.7	8,276	-2.0
Liberal	1			-1	2.0	5.4	1,757	-0.3
Ind. Conservative	1			+1	2.0	1.6	509	+1.6

== Ward results ==
All results are listed below:

Figures on turnout were taken from Plymouth University's Elections Centre, which gives the number of registered voters, and the percentage turnout for each ward. The number of ballots cast for each ward was calculated from these. Percentage change in turnout is compared with the same ward in the 1973 District Council election.

The percentage of the vote for each candidate was calculated compared with the number of ballots cast in the ward. Note that in a ward with more than one seat, voters were allowed to place as many crosses on the ballot paper as seats. The percentage change for each candidate is compared with the same candidate in the 1973 District Council election.

Candidates who were members of the council before the election are marked with an asterisk.

=== Ampthill ===
Ampthill (3 seats, 4,100 registered voters)
Party	Candidate	Votes	%	±%
Conservative	P Cowell	1,174	39.2	
Conservative	Ms A Palmer	1,172	39.2	+18.3
Liberal	P Cruse*	925	30.9	+9.1
Labour	Ms G Wagstaff*	893	29.8	+6.5
Labour	G Lane	413	13.8	−0.8
Labour	P Norton	358	12.0	
Turnout		2,993	73.0	−2.4

=== Arlesey ===
Arlesey (2 seats, 2,540 registered voters)
Party	Candidate	Votes	%	±%
Conservative	Ms A Albon*	727	56.0	+5.2
Labour	June Harrowell*	570	43.9	−5.2
Conservative	R Turner	528	40.7	−2.4
Labour	R Walker	491	37.8	
Turnout		1,298	51.1	+14.4

=== Aspley (No 13) ===
Aspley (No 13) (2 seats, 2,144 registered voters)
Party	Candidate	Votes	%	±%
Independent	W Klinner*	Unopposed	NA	
Independent	Ms W Campbell	Unopposed	NA	

=== Biggleswade (No 2) ===
Biggleswade (No 2) (6 seats, 7,379 registered voters)
Party	Candidate	Votes	%	±%
Independent	Ms C Cook*	2,164	36.0	−0.2
Conservative	Ms F Killeen	1,963	32.7	
Labour	L Chambers*	1,884	31.3	−7.3
Conservative	Patricia Rouse*	1,789	29.8	+4.6
Conservative	Richard Bennett	1,630	27.1	
Labour	Victor Brunt*	1,588	26.4	−8.9
Independent	Ms M Armstrong*	1,484	24.7	+0.0
Labour	R Pepper*	1,198	19.9	−9.3
Labour	Alistair Costley	1,030	17.1	−20.2
Labour	Ms A Wheeler	954	15.9	
Labour	C James	761	12.7	
Turnout		6,012	81.5	+13.5

=== Blunham (No 17) ===
Blunham (No 17) (1 seat, 1,289 registered voters)
Party	Candidate	Votes	%	±%
Conservative	Ms E Woods*	531	84.4	+40.6
Labour	Ms I Chapman	98	15.6	
Turnout		629	48.8	+0.0

=== Campton & Meppershall & Shefford (No 20) ===
Campton & Meppershall & Shefford (No 20) (4 seats, 5,105 registered voters)
Party	Candidate	Votes	%	±%
Conservative	F Burrows*	1,540	42.0	+5.1
Conservative	D Cadman	1,346	36.7	
Conservative	Geoffrey Rogers*	1,316	35.9	−1.9
Conservative	J Buxton	950	25.9	
Labour	A Smythe*	771	21.0	−10.1
Independent	F Pettifar	692	18.9	
Liberal	Ms P Bowry	668	18.2	
Independent	Ms M Faircloth	479	13.1	−10.6
Labour	R Evans	458	12.5	
Labour	Ms G Emmerson	363	9.9	
Turnout		3,670	71.9	+7.2

=== Clophill ===
Clophill (1 seat, 1,168 registered voters)
Party	Candidate	Votes	%	±%
Conservative	W Russell*	397	73.2	+13.9
Labour	R Bailey	145	26.8	−13.9
Turnout		542	46.4	+0.6

=== Cranfield ===
Cranfield (2 seats, 3,006 registered voters)
Party	Candidate	Votes	%	±%
Independent	A Wheewall*	Unopposed	NA	
Independent	J Salisbury*	Unopposed	NA	

=== Flitton & Pulloxhill & Westoning (No 10) ===
Flitton & Pulloxhill & Westoning (No 10) (2 seats, 2,209 registered voters)
Party	Candidate	Votes	%	±%
Conservative	Ms J Eells*	Unopposed	NA	
Conservative	Jean Kent*	Unopposed	NA	

=== Flitwick & Steppingly (No 11) ===
Flitwick & Steppingly (No 11) (3 seats, 4,260 registered voters)
Party	Candidate	Votes	%	±%
Conservative	Malcolm Randall*	1,152	65.3	+25.3
Conservative	M Humphrey	1,142	64.7	
Conservative	Dennis Gale	1,119	63.4	
Labour	Ms F Rolls*	613	34.7	+3.7
Labour	G Gammons	532	30.1	
Labour	R Lescott	422	23.9	
Turnout		1,765	41.4	+2.3

=== Harlington ===
Harlington (1 seat, 1,413 registered voters)
Party	Candidate	Votes	%	±%
Conservative	A Giles*	Unopposed	NA	

=== Haynes & Houghton Conquest ===
Haynes & Houghton Conquest (1 seat, 1,597 registered voters)
Party	Candidate	Votes	%	±%
Independent	H Craddock	507	82.7	+42.9
Labour	R Sparshott	106	17.3	
Turnout		613	38.4	−8.7

=== Henlow & Langford (No 21) ===
Henlow & Langford (No 21) (3 seats, 3,630 registered voters)
Party	Candidate	Votes	%	±%
Conservative	G Gates*	915	38.7	
Conservative	Patricia Cook	837	35.4	
Ind. Conservative	William Cliff	509	21.5	
Labour	A Loney	501	21.2	
Independent	G Charles*	438	18.5	
Turnout		2,363	65.1	

=== Lidlington (No 15) ===
Lidlington (No 15) (1 seat, 1,477 registered voters)
Party	Candidate	Votes	%	±%
Conservative	Fiona Chapman (Note: Mrs Chapman's full name is Catherine Fiona Chapman MBE. Since 2009 she has been councillor for Flitwick on Central Bedfordshire Council, and is listed on Central Bedfordshire Council's website as Cllr Mrs C Fiona Chapman MBE. She is sometimes listed as Catherine Chapman, and sometimes as Fiona Chapman. She was first elected to Mid Bedfordshire District Council in 1976.)	384	57.1	
Labour	A Donnelley*	289	42.9	
Turnout		673	45.6	+5.6

=== Maulden ===
Maulden (1 seat, 1,592 registered voters)
Party	Candidate	Votes	%	±%
Independent	Ms I Robinson*	644	87.1	+36.8
Labour	J Brown	95	12.9	
Turnout		739	46.4	−6.7

=== Marston (No 14) ===
Marston (No 14) (1 seat, 1,150 registered voters)
Party	Candidate	Votes	%	±%
Conservative	Ms C Barnes	525	61.8	
Labour	M Deacy	324	38.2	
Turnout		849	73.8	+17.8

=== Old Warden & Southill ===
Old Warden & Southill (1 seat, 1,173 registered voters)
Party	Candidate	Votes	%	±%
Conservative	J Saunderson*	375	64.0	+11.5
Labour	Ms M Hamer-Harries	211	36.0	
Turnout		586	50.0	+11.6

=== Northill (No 18) ===
Northill (No 18) (1 seat, 1,908 registered voters)
Party	Candidate	Votes	%	±%
Conservative	Patricia Turner	872	84.2	
Labour	Ms M Berry	164	15.8	
Turnout		1,036	54.3	+6.1

=== Potton (No 24) ===
Potton (No 24) (2 seats, 2,693 registered voters)
Party	Candidate	Votes	%	±%
Independent	F Jakes*	746	42.7	−11.4
Conservative	J Ream*	698	40.0	−5.8
Labour	D Forbes	302	17.3	
Labour	J Berry	293	16.8	
Turnout		1,746	64.8	+39.6

=== Sandy (No 3) ===
Sandy (No 3) (3 seats, 4,784 registered voters)
Party	Candidate	Votes	%	±%
Conservative	A Sherwood-King*	1,356	41.9	+4.9
Independent	K Quince*	1,323	40.9	−2.2
Conservative	Alistair Gammell	1,215	37.6	
Labour	P Monahan	555	17.2	
Labour	J Buckle	493	15.2	
Labour	W Hibbert	99	3.1	
Turnout		3,234	67.6	+19.7

=== Shillington & Stondon ===
Shillington & Stondon (2 seats, 2,529 registered voters)
Party	Candidate	Votes	%	±%
Independent	R Roe*	Unopposed	NA	
Independent	G Cooper*	Unopposed	NA	

=== Stotfold ===
Stotfold (3 seats, 4,105 registered voters)
Party	Candidate	Votes	%	±%
Independent	F Hyde*	763	34.8	−11.2
Conservative	J Long	748	34.1	
Independent	B Clark*	717	32.7	−8.6
Labour	H Wood*	682	31.1	−22.9
Independent	R Watkins	663	30.2	
Labour	W McColl	435	19.8	−6.4
Labour	Ms S Tookey	384	17.5	
Turnout		2,192	53.4	+18.8

=== Wensley (No 25) ===
Wensley (No 25) (1 seat, 915 registered voters)
Party	Candidate	Votes	%	±%
Conservative	W Goodyer*	308	56.5	+3.9
Liberal	D Walker	164	30.1	−17.3
Labour	Ms J Monahan	73	13.4	−6.5
Turnout		545	59.6	+9.5

=== Woburn ===
Woburn (1 seat, 1,236 registered voters)
Party	Candidate	Votes	%	±%
Conservative	D Woodward*	308	40.3	+5.8
Independent	Ms G Glasse*	241	31.5	−34.0
Independent	J Ellis	215	28.1	
Turnout		764	61.8	+15.2

=== Wrest ===
Wrest (1 seat, 1,416 registered voters)
Party	Candidate	Votes	%	±%
Independent	G Wood*	Unopposed	NA	
