= 1987 Mid Bedfordshire District Council election =

1987 UK local government election

| ← 1983 | 7 May 1987 | 1991 → |

All 53 seats for Whole Council 27 seats needed for a majority
- Registered: 80,384
- Turnout: 55%
| | First party | Second party | Third party |
|---|---|---|---|
| Party | Conservative | Independent | Alliance |
| Seats won | 43 | 5 | 3 |
| Popular vote | 20,740 | 3,723 | 5,802 |
| Percentage | 54.0% | 9.7% | 15.1% |
| | Fourth party | Fifth party | Sixth party |
| Party | Labour | Ind. Conservative | Green |
| Seats won | 2 | 0 | 0 |
| Popular vote | 7,646 | 365 | 137 |
| Percentage | 19.9% | 1.0% | 0.4% |
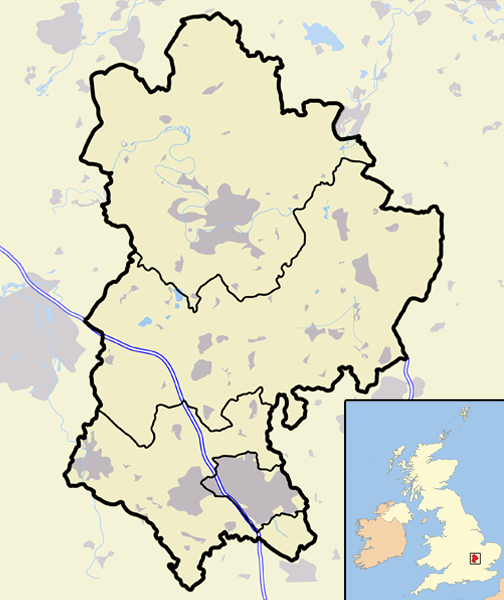
- Locations of wards in Mid Bedfordshire

Elections to Mid Bedfordshire District Council were held on 7 May 1987. All 53 seats were up for election.

== Result ==
Gains and losses in the results table are compared with the 1983 district council election.

Mid Bedfordshire District Council Election Result 1987
| Party | Seats | Gains | Losses | Net gain/loss | Seats % | Votes % | Votes | +/− |
|---|---|---|---|---|---|---|---|---|
| Conservative | 43 | | | +7 | 81.1 | 54.0 | 20,740 | +7.4 |
| Independent | 5 | | | -4 | 9.4 | 9.7 | 3,723 | -5.8 |
| Alliance | 3 | | | +2 | 5.7 | 15.1 | 5,802 | +4.8 |
| Labour | 2 | | | -5 | 3.8 | 19.9 | 7,646 | -4.6 |
| Ind. Conservative | 0 | | | 0 | 0.0 | 1.0 | 365 | +1.0 |
| Green | 0 | | | +0 | 0.0 | 0.4 | 137 | +0.4 |

== Ward results ==
All results are listed below:

Figures on turnout were taken from Plymouth University's Elections Centre, which gives the number of registered voters, and the percentage turnout for each ward. The number of ballots cast for each ward was calculated from these. Percentage change in turnout is compared with the same ward in the 1983 District Council election.

The percentage of the vote for each candidate was calculated compared with the number of ballots cast in the ward. Note that in a ward with more than one seat, voters were allowed to place as many crosses on the ballot paper as seats. The percentage change for each candidate is compared with the same candidate in the 1983 District Council election.

Candidates who were members of the council before the election are marked with an asterisk.

=== Ampthill ===
Ampthill (3 seats, 4,596 registered voters)
| Party | Candidate | Votes | % | ±% |
|---|---|---|---|---|
| Conservative | Richard Holden | 1,302 | 39.2 | |
| Conservative | Ms A Palmer* | 1,260 | 37.9 | +5.4 |
| Alliance | Susan Young | 1,103 | 33.2 | |
| Labour | Ms G Wagstaff* | 916 | 27.6 | −6.3 |
| Labour | Ms C Duffin | 521 | 15.7 | |
| Labour | R Williams | 340 | 10.2 | |
| Turnout | | 3,323 | 72.3 | −0.2 |

=== Arlesey ===
Arlesey (2 seats, 3,255 registered voters)
| Party | Candidate | Votes | % | ±% |
|---|---|---|---|---|
| Labour | David Harrowell* | 833 | 50.8 | −2.0 |
| Conservative | R Turner* | 808 | 49.2 | +2.1 |
| Labour | Victor Williams | 618 | 37.7 | |
| Turnout | | 1,641 | 50.4 | |

=== Aspley ===
Aspley (2 seats, 2,532 registered voters)
| Party | Candidate | Votes | % | ±% |
|---|---|---|---|---|
| Conservative | Fiona Chapman* (Note: Mrs Chapman's full name is Catherine Fiona Chapman MBE. Since 2009 she has been councillor for Flitwick on Central Bedfordshire Council, and is listed on Central Bedfordshire Council's website as Cllr Mrs C Fiona Chapman MBE. She is sometimes listed as Catherine Chapman, and sometimes as Fiona Chapman. She was first elected to Mid Bedfordshire District Council in 1976.) | 841 | 52.7 | +7.9 |
| Conservative | Robert Brown | 756 | 47.4 | |
| Alliance | Ms A Crampin* | 599 | 37.6 | +9.0 |
| Labour | Ms L McDowell | 156 | 9.8 | |
| Labour | Ms J Walmsley | 143 | 9.0 | |
| Turnout | | 1,595 | 63.0 | |

=== Biggleswade Ivel ===
Biggleswade Ivel (3 seats, 4,891 registered voters)
| Party | Candidate | Votes | % | ±% |
|---|---|---|---|---|
| Conservative | Patricia Rouse | 1,515 | 59.7 | +29.3 |
| Conservative | Peter Vickers* | 1,432 | 56.4 | +12.7 |
| Conservative | D Strachan* | 1,080 | 42.6 | +11.9 |
| Labour | L Chambers* | 1,021 | 40.2 | +4.9 |
| Labour | Peter Malyon | 656 | 25.8 | |
| Labour | Alistair Costley | 265 | 10.4 | −12.6 |
| Turnout | | 2,538 | 51.9 | |

=== Biggleswade Stratton ===
Biggleswade Stratton (3 seats, 4,469 registered voters)
| Party | Candidate | Votes | % | ±% |
|---|---|---|---|---|
| Conservative | Richard Bennett* | 1,376 | 40.8 | +7.9 |
| Conservative | David Smith | 1,255 | 37.2 | +7.8 |
| Independent | Ms C Cook* | 1,013 | 30.1 | −4.9 |
| Labour | Victor Brunt* | 981 | 29.1 | −3.0 |
| Labour | Bernard Briars | 745 | 22.1 | |
| Labour | Amy Forbes | 606 | 18.0 | |
| Turnout | | 3,370 | 75.4 | |

=== Blunham ===
Blunham (1 seat, 1,581 registered voters)
| Party | Candidate | Votes | % | ±% |
|---|---|---|---|---|
| Conservative | N Davidson* | 598 | 81.4 | +18.1 |
| Green | Ms J Lawrence | 137 | 18.6 | |
| Turnout | | 735 | 46.5 | |

=== Campton & Meppershall ===
Campton & Meppershall (1 seat, 1,403 registered voters)
| Party | Candidate | Votes | % | ±% |
|---|---|---|---|---|
| Conservative | D Price | 574 | 77.9 | |
| Labour | Ms J Kimber | 163 | 22.1 | |
| Turnout | | 737 | 52.5 | |

=== Clifton & Henlow ===
Clifton & Henlow (3 seats, 4,049 registered voters)
| Party | Candidate | Votes | % | ±% |
|---|---|---|---|---|
| Conservative | Geoffrey Rogers* | 1,196 | 60.8 | −7.6 |
| Conservative | Patricia Cook* | 1,148 | 58.3 | −3.4 |
| Conservative | Ms G Burn* | 1,093 | 55.5 | +0.2 |
| Independent | L Simpson | 418 | 21.2 | |
| Labour | Ms J Bird | 352 | 17.9 | |
| Labour | M Tenwick | 319 | 16.2 | −0.0 |
| Turnout | | 1,968 | 48.6 | +7.3 |

=== Clophill ===
Clophill (1 seat, 1,245 registered voters)
| Party | Candidate | Votes | % | ±% |
|---|---|---|---|---|
| Conservative | W Russell* | 423 | 74.7 | +6.9 |
| Labour | K Phillips | 143 | 25.3 | |
| Turnout | | 566 | 45.5 | |

=== Cranfield ===
Cranfield (3 seats, 3,167 registered voters)
| Party | Candidate | Votes | % | ±% |
|---|---|---|---|---|
| Conservative | R Palmer* | 991 | 64.6 | +30.7 |
| Conservative | T Grimes* | 949 | 61.9 | +16.3 |
| Conservative | Ms A Harris | 893 | 58.3 | |
| Alliance | J Hamilton | 292 | 19.0 | |
| Alliance | S Wood | 279 | 18.2 | |
| Alliance | J Heley | 250 | 16.3 | |
| Labour | Alan Morris | 250 | 16.3 | +2.7 |
| Labour | R Harris | 228 | 14.9 | |
| Labour | R Martin | 204 | 13.3 | +7.4 |
| Turnout | | 1,533 | 48.4 | +7.7 |

=== Flitton, Greenfield & Pulloxhill ===
Flitton, Greenfield & Pulloxhill (1 seat, 1,374 registered voters)
| Party | Candidate | Votes | % | ±% |
|---|---|---|---|---|
| Conservative | Ms J Eells* | 569 | 82.9 | +1.2 |
| Labour | Peter Churchill | 117 | 17.1 | +5.4 |
| Turnout | | 686 | 49.9 | +1.2 |

=== Flitwick East ===
Flitwick East (2 seats, 3,775 registered voters)
| Party | Candidate | Votes | % | ±% |
|---|---|---|---|---|
| Conservative | Jack Cowell* | 993 | 70.7 | |
| Conservative | Malcolm Randall* | 959 | 68.3 | |
| Labour | J Bannister | 413 | 29.4 | |
| Labour | Dudley Davis | 308 | 21.9 | |
| Turnout | | 1,404 | 37.2 | −4.9 |

=== Flitwick West ===
Flitwick West (2 seats, 4,289 registered voters)
| Party | Candidate | Votes | % | ±% |
|---|---|---|---|---|
| Conservative | Dennis Gale* | 1,146 | 58.2 | +0.3 |
| Conservative | Cynthia Baker* | 1,143 | 58.0 | +9.0 |
| Alliance | Ms C Watton | 616 | 31.3 | |
| Alliance | John Watton | 571 | 29.0 | |
| Labour | D Churchill | 205 | 10.4 | |
| Labour | Arthur Watson | 201 | 10.2 | |
| Turnout | | 1,969 | 45.9 | |

=== Harlington ===
Harlington (1 seat, 1,913 registered voters)
| Party | Candidate | Votes | % | ±% |
|---|---|---|---|---|
| Alliance | Brian Golby | 568 | 50.7 | |
| Conservative | H Cousins | 411 | 36.7 | |
| Labour | J Conibeer | 142 | 12.7 | |
| Turnout | | 1,121 | 58.6 | |

=== Haynes & Houghton Conquest ===
Haynes & Houghton Conquest (1 seat, 1,948 registered voters)
| Party | Candidate | Votes | % | ±% |
|---|---|---|---|---|
| Conservative | Eleanor Dorman | 616 | 60.7 | |
| Labour | B Oertel | 226 | 22.3 | −17.5 |
| Alliance | Ms M Limond | 173 | 17.0 | |
| Turnout | | 1,015 | 52.1 | |

=== Langford ===
Langford (1 seat, 2,161 registered voters)
| Party | Candidate | Votes | % | ±% |
|---|---|---|---|---|
| Conservative | Ms P Trussell | 606 | 53.7 | |
| Alliance | D Hanscombe | 288 | 25.5 | |
| Labour | A Loney* | 234 | 20.7 | |
| Turnout | | 1,128 | 52.2 | |

=== Marston ===
Marston (2 seats, 3,299 registered voters)
| Party | Candidate | Votes | % | ±% |
|---|---|---|---|---|
| Conservative | Ms C Barnes* | 886 | 48.1 | −15.6 |
| Conservative | G Howe | 715 | 38.8 | |
| Ind. Conservative | B Meddings* | 365 | 19.8 | −31.6 |
| Labour | Elizabeth Rooney | 310 | 16.8 | |
| Alliance | P Sunman | 280 | 15.2 | |
| Labour | H Walmsley | 264 | 14.3 | |
| Turnout | | 1,841 | 55.8 | |

=== Maulden ===
Maulden (1 seat, 2,008 registered voters)
| Party | Candidate | Votes | % | ±% |
|---|---|---|---|---|
| Conservative | Ms B New | 555 | 55.4 | |
| Independent | Eileen Brown | 284 | 28.4 | |
| Labour | Ms J Nicklin | 86 | 8.6 | |
| Alliance | R Richards | 76 | 7.6 | |
| Turnout | | 1,001 | 49.9 | |

=== Northill ===
Northill (1 seat, 1,674 registered voters)
| Party | Candidate | Votes | % | ±% |
|---|---|---|---|---|
| Conservative | Patricia Turner* | Unopposed | NA | |

=== Old Warden & Southill ===
Old Warden & Southill (1 seat, 1,275 registered voters)
| Party | Candidate | Votes | % | ±% |
|---|---|---|---|---|
| Alliance | Ms M Hamer-Harries* | Unopposed | NA | |

=== Potton ===
Potton (2 seats, 3,419 registered voters)
| Party | Candidate | Votes | % | ±% |
|---|---|---|---|---|
| Independent | F Jakes* | 813 | 43.6 | +0.1 |
| Conservative | J Ream* | 719 | 38.5 | +2.6 |
| Labour | I Forbes | 334 | 17.9 | |
| Labour | J Morgan | 248 | 13.3 | −7.2 |
| Turnout | | 1,866 | 54.6 | |

=== Sandy All Saints ===
Sandy All Saints (2 seats, 2,874 registered voters)
| Party | Candidate | Votes | % | ±% |
|---|---|---|---|---|
| Conservative | Alistair Gammell* | Unopposed | NA | |
| Conservative | A Sherwood-King* | Unopposed | NA | |

=== Sandy St Swithuns ===
Sandy St Swithuns (3 seats, 3,632 registered voters)
| Party | Candidate | Votes | % | ±% |
|---|---|---|---|---|
| Conservative | Ms P Lack | 835 | 56.8 | |
| Conservative | T Sherwood-King | 748 | 50.8 | +15.4 |
| Conservative | T Rice | 748 | 50.8 | |
| Alliance | G Goodwin | 637 | 43.3 | |
| Alliance | P Tomlin | 618 | 42.0 | |
| Alliance | N Lister | 594 | 40.4 | |
| Turnout | | 1,471 | 40.5 | |

=== Shefford ===
Shefford (2 seats, 2,595 registered voters)
| Party | Candidate | Votes | % | ±% |
|---|---|---|---|---|
| Conservative | Ms E Burson* | 711 | 37.0 | +2.5 |
| Independent | Ms M Faircloth* | 515 | 26.8 | +2.9 |
| Alliance | A Smyth | 512 | 26.6 | +4.4 |
| Labour | D Brooks | 186 | 9.7 | |
| Labour | T Bornett | 150 | 7.8 | −14.7 |
| Turnout | | 1,923 | 74.1 | |

=== Shillington & Stondon ===
Shillington & Stondon (2 seats, 2,658 registered voters)
| Party | Candidate | Votes | % | ±% |
|---|---|---|---|---|
| Conservative | Ms R Simkins | 847 | 42.0 | +0.5 |
| Independent | R Roe | 680 | 33.7 | −8.4 |
| Alliance | Ms W Barker | 348 | 17.3 | |
| Labour | M Woodbine | 141 | 7.0 | |
| Labour | Ellen Houliston | 105 | 5.2 | |
| Turnout | | 2,015 | 75.8 | |

=== Stotfold ===
Stotfold (3 seats, 4,803 registered voters)
| Party | Candidate | Votes | % | ±% |
|---|---|---|---|---|
| Conservative | J Long* | Unopposed | NA | |
| Independent | F Hyde* | Unopposed | NA | |
| Labour | H Wood* | Unopposed | NA | |

=== Wensley ===
Wensley (1 seat, 1,305 registered voters)
| Party | Candidate | Votes | % | ±% |
|---|---|---|---|---|
| Conservative | Brian E Collier | 507 | 62.1 | |
| Alliance | D Walker | 181 | 22.2 | |
| Labour | Ms J Pates | 129 | 15.8 | |
| Turnout | | 817 | 62.6 | |

=== Westoning ===
Westoning (1 seat, 1,335 registered voters)
| Party | Candidate | Votes | % | ±% |
|---|---|---|---|---|
| Conservative | Jean Kent* | 531 | 83.0 | |
| Labour | J Gregory | 109 | 17.0 | |
| Turnout | | 640 | 47.9 | |

=== Woburn ===
Woburn (1 seat, 1,249 registered voters)
| Party | Candidate | Votes | % | ±% |
|---|---|---|---|---|
| Conservative | D Woodward* | 529 | 74.1 | −4.6 |
| Alliance | J Ellis | 129 | 18.1 | −3.3 |
| Labour | M Loney | 57 | 8.0 | |
| Turnout | | 714 | 57.2 | |

=== Wrest ===
Wrest (1 seat, 1,610 registered voters)
| Party | Candidate | Votes | % | ±% |
|---|---|---|---|---|
| Conservative | R Thurman* | 655 | 82.2 | +35.3 |
| Labour | Ms P Cue | 142 | 17.8 | −14.3 |
| Turnout | | 797 | 49.5 | |
