= 1999 Mid Bedfordshire District Council election =

1999 UK local government election

← 1995	6 May 1999	2003 →

Whole Council 27 seats needed for a majority
- Registered: 90,713
- Turnout: 35%
	First party	Second party	Third party
Party	Conservative	Labour	Liberal Democrats
Seats won	34	7	6
Popular vote	15,155	9,097	6,190
Percentage	45.7%	27.4%	18.7%
	Fourth party
Party	Independent
Seats won	6
Popular vote	2,747
Percentage	8.3%
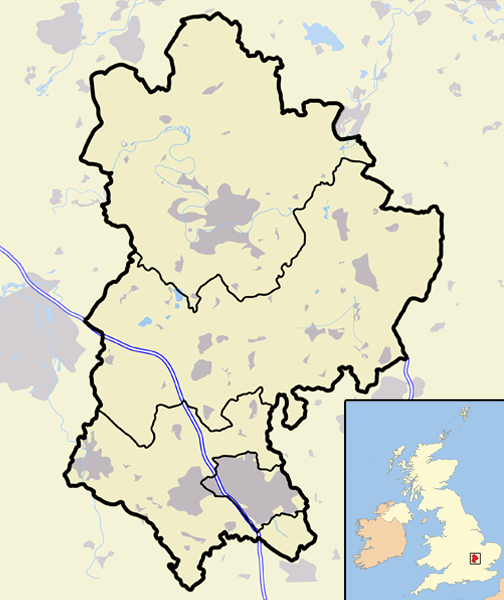
- Locations of wards in Mid Bedfordshire

Elections to Mid Bedfordshire District Council were held on 6 May 1999. All 53 seats were up for election. The Conservative Party gained overall control of the council, increasing their number of seats from 22 to 34, whilst the Labour Party declined from having 20 seats in 1995 to 7.

== Results summary ==
Mid Bedfordshire District Council Election Result 1999
Party	Seats	Gains	Losses	Net gain/loss	Seats %	Votes %	Votes	+/−
Conservative	34			+12	64.2	45.7	15,155	+10.1
Labour	7			-13	13.2	27.4	9,097	-9.8
Liberal Democrats	6			+1	11.3	18.7	6,190	+1.9
Independent	6			0	11.3	8.3	2,747	-1.7

== Ward results ==
All results are listed below:

Numbers of ballots cast and the percentage (to two decimal places) were given in the results published by Mid Bedfordshire District Council, but checked against results taken from Plymouth University's Elections Centre, which gives the number of registered voters, and the percentage turnout for each ward. Percentage change in turnout is compared with the same ward in the 1995 District Council election.

The percentage of the vote for each candidate was calculated compared with the number of ballots cast in the ward. Note that in a ward with more than one seat, voters were allowed to place as many crosses on the ballot paper as seats. The percentage change for each candidate is compared with the same candidate in the 1995 District Council election.

Candidates who were members of the council before the election are marked with an asterisk.

=== Ampthill ===
Ampthill (3 seats, 5,323 registered voters)
Party	Candidate	Votes	%	±%
Liberal Democrats	Susan Young*	1,266	63.4	+22.8
Liberal Democrats	Catherine Dover	906	45.4	
Conservative	Richard Holden*	824	41.3	−0.1
Conservative	Pauline Mayhead	773	38.7	+5.4
Liberal Democrats	Gordon Willey	692	34.7	
Labour	Joseph Morris*	495	24.8	−12.4
Labour	Sheila Gardner	358	17.9	−13.6
Turnout		1,998	37.54	−7.1

=== Arlesey ===
Arlesey (2 seats, 3,550 registered voters)
Party	Candidate	Votes	%	±%
Independent	June Harrowell	543	55.6	
Independent	Victor Williams	521	53.4	
Labour	Patricia Harris	386	39.5	
Labour	Philip Ross	320	32.8	
Turnout		976	27.49	−13.3

=== Aspley ===
Aspley (2 seats, 2,711 registered voters)
Party	Candidate	Votes	%	±%
Conservative	Fiona Chapman* (Note: Mrs Chapman's full name is Catherine Fiona Chapman MBE. Since 2009 she has been councillor for Flitwick on Central Bedfordshire Council, and is listed on Central Bedfordshire Council's website as Cllr Mrs C Fiona Chapman MBE. She is sometimes listed as Catherine Chapman, and sometimes as Fiona Chapman. She was first elected to Mid Bedfordshire District Council in 1976.)	592	54.3	+9.0
Conservative	Robert Brown*	576	52.8	+9.9
Liberal Democrats	Robert Martin	387	35.5	+5.8
Labour	Neil Davis	355	32.6	
Turnout		1,089	40.17	−5.8

=== Biggleswade Ivel ===
Biggleswade Ivel (3 seats, 5,337 registered voters)
Party	Candidate	Votes	%	±%
Labour	Alistair Costley*	847	49.7	+1.8
Labour	Rex Skinner	827	48.6	
Labour	Peter Malyon*	779	45.7	−0.8
Conservative	Patricia Rouse	683	40.1	+6.0
Conservative	Lesley Mayhew	671	39.4	
Conservative	David Lawrence	653	38.3	
Turnout		1,704	31.93	−9.5

=== Biggleswade Stratton ===
Biggleswade Stratton (3 seats, 5,677 registered voters)
Party	Candidate	Votes	%	±%
Labour	David Albone*	767	44.9	−9.2
Conservative	Peter Vickers	736	43.1	+7.8
Labour	Hilary Broderick	679	39.7	
Conservative	Paul Mayhew	677	39.6	
Labour	Kevin Merrett*	668	39.1	−5.7
Conservative	Michael Cazaly	640	37.4	
Liberal Democrats	Margaret Bracey	381	22.3	
Turnout		1,707	30.07	−9.3

=== Blunham ===
Blunham (1 seat, 1,683 registered voters)
Party	Candidate	Votes	%	±%
Conservative	Lorraine Fountain	514	70.7	
Labour	Paul Shilladay	201	27.6	
Turnout		727	43.20	−1.6

=== Campton & Meppershall ===
Campton & Meppershall (1 seat, 1,770 registered voters)
Party	Candidate	Votes	%	±%
Conservative	Francis Keen	396	55.4	
Liberal Democrats	Alexander Stone	218	30.5	
Labour	Richard Howe	101	14.1	
Turnout		715	40.40	−9.5

=== Clifton & Henlow ===
Clifton & Henlow (3 seats, 4,298 registered voters)
Party	Candidate	Votes	%	±%
Conservative	Geoffrey Rogers*	795	50.0	+11.4
Conservative	Patricia Cook*	750	47.2	+9.2
Liberal Democrats	William Cliff*	731	46.0	+3.0
Liberal Democrats	Pauline Livesey	646	40.6	
Liberal Democrats	Christine Swain	573	36.0	+2.3
Labour	David Devereux	374	23.5	+3.6
Turnout		1,592	37.04	−4.8

=== Clophill ===
Clophill (1 seat, 1,292 registered voters)
Party	Candidate	Votes	%	±%
Conservative	Martin Hawkins	373	74.2	
Labour	Glenda Tizard*	126	25.0	
Turnout		502	38.85	+2.0

=== Cranfield ===
Cranfield (3 seats, 3,800 registered voters)
Party	Candidate	Votes	%	±%
Conservative	Sylvia Dosser	521	45.9	
Conservative	Kenneth Matthews	450	39.6	
Conservative	Yvonne Fitzgerald-Finch*	449	39.5	+16.0
Independent	Alan Bastable	337	29.7	
Labour	Laurence Pollock	304	26.8	+4.4
Independent	Roger Baker	295	26.0	−2.0
Labour	Frances Bower	273	24.0	
Labour	Jacqueline Aucott	257	22.6	
Independent	Peter Henson	246	21.7	
Turnout		1,135	29.87	−11.2

=== Flitton, Greenfield & Pulloxhill ===
Flitton, Greenfield & Pulloxhill (1 seat, 1,631 registered voters)
Party	Candidate	Votes	%	±%
Conservative	David Thompson	Unopposed	NA	

=== Flitwick East ===
Flitwick East (2 seats, 4,147 registered voters)
Party	Candidate	Votes	%	±%
Conservative	Rowland Goodman	597	52.0	
Labour	Paul Griffiths*	553	48.1	−2.4
Labour	Maurice Layton*	531	46.2	−3.1
Conservative	Victor Lee	517	45.0	
Turnout		1,149	27.7	−8.2

Results published by Mid Beds District Council show 2,204 ballot papers cast, a 49.93% turnout of an electorate of 4,414. Results given by Plymouth University's Elections Centre show a turnout of 27.7% and an electorate of 4,147.

=== Flitwick West ===
Flitwick West (2 seats, 5,024 registered voters)
Party	Candidate	Votes	%	±%
Conservative	Dennis Gale	620	42.1	+8.1
Conservative	James Gardner	599	40.7	
Labour	Glen Pullen*	452	30.7	−21.3
Labour	Stephen Marsh	433	29.4	
Liberal Democrats	John Watton	378	25.7	
Liberal Democrats	Susannah Mason	340	23.1	
Turnout		1,472	29.30	−7.0

=== Harlington ===
Harlington (1 seat, 1,790 registered voters)
Party	Candidate	Votes	%	±%
Liberal Democrats	Brian Golby*	756	85.5	+22.0
Conservative	Richard Barnes	121	13.7	
Turnout		884	49.39	−6.7

=== Haynes & Houghton Conquest ===
Haynes & Houghton Conquest (1 seat, 2,005 registered voters)
Party	Candidate	Votes	%	±%
Conservative	Rodney Bowdidge	591	71.0	
Labour	Paul Bouch	238	28.6	−16.2
Turnout		832	41.50	−3.6

=== Langford ===
Langford (1 seat, 2,255 registered voters)
Party	Candidate	Votes	%	±%
Labour	Joseph Mayes*	482	57.8	−4.7
Conservative	Peter Evans	350	42.0	
Turnout		835	37.03	−3.2

=== Marston ===
Marston (2 seats, 4,115 registered voters)
Party	Candidate	Votes	%	±%
Conservative	Isla Lake*	690	53.9	+16.5
Conservative	Darren Tysoe	665	52.0	+20.8
Labour	Alan Morris*	416	32.5	−1.4
Labour	Elizabeth Rooney	346	27.0	
Turnout		1,279	31.08	−6.7

=== Maulden ===
Maulden (1 seat, 2,208 registered voters)
Party	Candidate	Votes	%	±%
Conservative	Howard Lockey	616	58.2	
Labour	Stephen Phillpot	432	40.8	
Turnout		1,057	47.87	+0.5

=== Northill ===
Northill (1 seat, 1,760 registered voters)
Party	Candidate	Votes	%	±%
Conservative	Patricia Turner*	Unopposed	NA	

=== Old Warden & Southill ===
Old Warden & Southill (1 seat, 1,073 registered voters)
Party	Candidate	Votes	%	±%
Conservative	Neal Capon	255	54.5	
Liberal Democrats	Anthony Baines	212	45.3	
Turnout		468	43.62	−0.2

=== Potton ===
Potton (2 seats, 3,684 registered voters)
Party	Candidate	Votes	%	±%
Conservative	Anita Lewis*	759	60.8	+21.9
Conservative	Doreen Gurney*	733	58.7	+19.6
Labour	Nigel Butlin	447	35.8	−1.1
Labour	David Brittain	399	31.9	+0.7
Turnout		1,247	33.85	−4.4

=== Sandy All Saints ===
Sandy All Saints (2 seats, 2,965 registered voters)
Party	Candidate	Votes	%	±%
Conservative	Alistair Gammell*	531	59.5	+5.8
Independent	Anthony Goss*	458	51.3	−13.1
Labour	Ann-Marie Ogonah	231	25.9	
Labour	Thomas Royle	207	23.2	
Turnout		893	30.12	−6.0

=== Sandy St Swithuns ===
Sandy St Swithuns (3 seats, 5,023 registered voters)
Party	Candidate	Votes	%	±%
Independent	John Gurney*	719	51.1	−1.9
Independent	Maxwell McMurdo*	584	41.5	
Liberal Democrats	Peter Blaine*	539	38.3	−0.8
Conservative	Gina Browne	428	30.4	
Conservative	Carol Leverkus	413	29.4	
Labour	James Butler*	339	24.1	−9.6
Labour	Edward Joyce	249	17.7	
Labour	Leslie Mitchell	230	16.4	
Liberal Democrats	Geoffrey Hollands	185	13.2	
Turnout		1,407	28.01	−11.1

=== Shefford ===
Shefford (2 seats, 3,638 registered voters)
Party	Candidate	Votes	%	±%
Conservative	Lewis Birt	584	48.8	
Conservative	Anthony Brown	536	44.8	+16.8
Labour	Carolyn Devereux	433	36.2	+13.9%
Labour	Charles Wilkinson	348	29.1	
Liberal Democrats	Sarah Hall	284	23.7	
Turnout		1,197	32.90	−15.2

=== Shillington & Stondon ===
Shillington & Stondon (2 seats, 2,903 registered voters)
Party	Candidate	Votes	%	±%
Conservative	Rita Drinkwater	700	58.4	
Conservative	Anthony Whiteman	606	50.5	
Labour	Timothy Bornett	509	42.5	
Labour	Brian Oertel	366	30.5	
Turnout		1,200	41.34	−2.5

=== Stotfold ===
Stotfold (3 seats, 4,894 registered voters)
Party	Candidate	Votes	%	±%
Conservative	John Street*	1,068	57.4	+17.9
Liberal Democrats	Brian Collier	1,038	55.8	+30.5
Conservative	Malcolm Smith*	1,024	55.1	+20.9
Conservative	John Saunders*	969	52.1	+13.8
Turnout		1,861	38.03	−13.2

=== Wensley ===
Wensley (1 seat, 1,435 registered voters)
Party	Candidate	Votes	%	±%
Conservative	Brian E Collier*	465	75.7	+24.3
Labour	Stephen Ball	141	23.0	
Turnout		614	42.79	−4.7

=== Westoning ===
Westoning (1 seat, 1,456 registered voters)
Party	Candidate	Votes	%	±%
Conservative	Andrew Rayment*	464	76.2	+21.8
Labour	Andrew Faughnan	145	23.8	
Turnout		609	41.83	+0.7

=== Woburn ===
Woburn (1 seat, 1,378 registered voters)
Party	Candidate	Votes	%	±%
Conservative	Anthony Duggan*	455	81.0	+21.4
Labour	Pauline Gilmore	107	19.0	
Turnout		562	40.78	−13.3

=== Wrest ===
Wrest (1 seat, 1,888 registered voters)
Party	Candidate	Votes	%	±%
Conservative	Kathleen Keen	452	66.9	
Labour	Ellen Houliston	216	32.0	+0.2
Turnout		675	35.75	−5.0
