= 1995 Mid Bedfordshire District Council election =

1995 UK local government election

← 1991	4 May 1995	1999 →

Whole Council 27 seats needed for a majority
- Registered: 84,121
- Turnout: 42%
	First party	Second party	Third party
Party	Conservative	Labour	Independent
Seats won	21	20	7
Popular vote	13,688	14,322	3,845
Percentage	35.5%	37.2%	10.0%
	Fourth party	Fifth party
Party	Liberal Democrats	Green
Seats won	5	0
Popular vote	6,463	220
Percentage	16.8%	0.6%
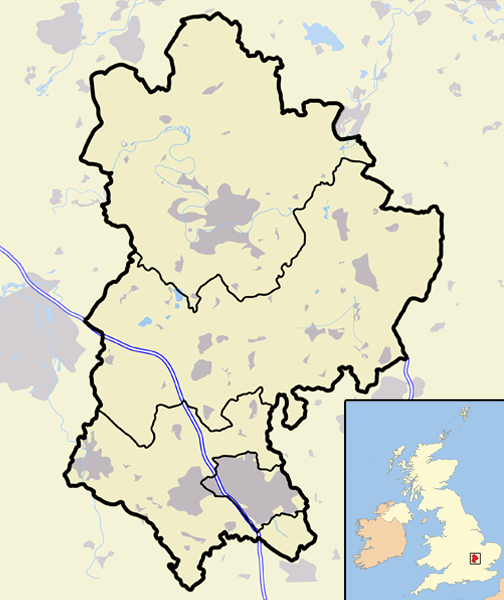
- Locations of wards in Mid Bedfordshire

Elections to Mid Bedfordshire District Council were held on 4 May 1995. All 53 seats were up for election.

== Result ==
Gains and losses in the results table are compared with the 1991 district council election.

Mid Bedfordshire District Council Election Result 1995
Party	Seats	Gains	Losses	Net gain/loss	Seats %	Votes %	Votes	+/−
Conservative	21			-19	39.6	35.5	13,688	-13.6
Labour	20			+17	37.7	37.2	14,322	+12.7
Independent	7			+0	13.2	10.0	3,845	-2.7
Liberal Democrats	5			+2	9.4	16.8	6,463	+3.2
Green	0			+0	0.0	0.6	220	+0.6

== Ward Results ==
All results are listed below:

Figures on turnout were taken from Plymouth University's Elections Centre, which gives the number of registered voters, and the percentage turnout for each ward. The number of ballots cast for each ward was calculated from these. Percentage change in turnout is compared with the same ward in the 1991 District Council election.

The percentage of the vote for each candidate was calculated compared with the number of ballots cast in the ward. Note that in a ward with more than one seat, voters were allowed to place as many crosses on the ballot paper as seats. The percentage change for each candidate is compared with the same candidate in the 1991 District Council election.

Candidates who were members of the council before the election are marked with an asterisk.

=== Ampthill ===
Ampthill (3 seats, 4,947 registered voters)
Party	Candidate	Votes	%	±%
Conservative	Richard Holden*	914	41.4	−20.7
Liberal Democrats	Susan Young	896	40.6	+1.6
Labour	Joseph Morris	820	37.2	
Conservative	Pauline Mayhead*	736	33.4	−8.7
Conservative	F Soaper	702	31.8	
Labour	Sheila Gardner	696	31.6	
Labour	Ms J Nicklin	659	29.9	+13.2
Turnout		2,206	44.6	+1.6

=== Arlesey ===
Arlesey (2 seats, 3,397 registered voters)
Party	Candidate	Votes	%	±%
Labour	David Harrowell	1,033	74.5	+15.6
Labour	Dorothy Brown	954	68.8	
Conservative	Ms L Whitney-Long	301	21.7	
Turnout		1,386	40.8	

=== Aspley ===
Aspley (2 seats, 2,612 registered voters)
Party	Candidate	Votes	%	±%
Conservative	Fiona Chapman* (Note: Mrs Chapman's full name is Catherine Fiona Chapman MBE. Since 2009 she has been councillor for Flitwick on Central Bedfordshire Council, and is listed on Central Bedfordshire Council's website as Cllr Mrs C Fiona Chapman MBE. She is sometimes listed as Catherine Chapman, and sometimes as Fiona Chapman. She was first elected to Mid Bedfordshire District Council in 1976.)	545	45.3	−12.6
Conservative	Robert Brown*	516	42.9	−10.9
Liberal Democrats	Robert Martin	357	29.7	
Labour	Ms J Walmsley	349	29.0	
Labour	D Newbould	326	27.1	
Turnout		1,202	46.0	

=== Biggleswade Ivel ===
Biggleswade Ivel (3 seats, 5,001 registered voters)
Party	Candidate	Votes	%	±%
Labour	Alistair Costley	992	47.9	
Labour	Peter Malyon	963	46.5	+14.0
Labour	Kevin Merrett	928	44.8	
Independent	P Rook	710	34.3	
Conservative	Patricia Rouse	707	34.2	−25.3
Conservative	D Strachan*	594	28.7	−17.1
Conservative	R Weedon	503	24.3	
Turnout		2,070	41.4	

=== Biggleswade Stratton ===
Biggleswade Stratton (3 seats, 5,300 registered voters)
Party	Candidate	Votes	%	±%
Labour	David Albone	1,130	54.1	
Labour	C Owen	1,055	50.5	
Labour	I Baguley	1,049	50.2	
Conservative	Peter Vickers*	736	35.2	−19.3
Conservative	Richard Bennett*	597	28.6	−22.3
Liberal Democrats	Margaret Bracey	498	23.9	
Turnout		2,088	39.4	−8.6

=== Blunham ===
Blunham (1 seat, 1,601 registered voters)
Party	Candidate	Votes	%	±%
Conservative	N Davidson*	375	52.3	
Labour	A Loney	172	24.0	
Liberal Democrats	J Sharrock	169	23.6	
Turnout		717	44.8	

=== Campton & Meppershall ===
Campton & Meppershall (1 seat, 1,442 registered voters)
Party	Candidate	Votes	%	±%
Conservative	C Biggins	376	52.2	
Labour	Ms J Kimber	339	47.1	
Turnout		720	49.9	

=== Clifton & Henlow ===
Clifton & Henlow (3 seats, 4,063 registered voters)
Party	Candidate	Votes	%	±%
Liberal Democrats	William Cliff*	729	42.9	−14.1
Conservative	Geoffrey Rogers*	656	38.6	−23.7
Conservative	Patricia Cook*	645	38.0	−16.0
Liberal Democrats	Pauline Livesey	635	37.4	
Liberal Democrats	Christine Swain	573	33.7	
Labour	Carolyn Devereux	378	22.3	
Labour	David Devereux	339	20.0	
Labour	Ms K Morgan-Gray	331	19.5	
Turnout		1,698	41.8	

=== Clophill ===
Clophill (1 seat, 1,274 registered voters)
Party	Candidate	Votes	%	±%
Conservative	Robert Dunne*	255	54.3	−20.1
Labour	J Farr	213	45.3	
Turnout		470	36.9	

=== Cranfield ===
Cranfield (3 seats, 3,441 registered voters)
Party	Candidate	Votes	%	±%
Independent	N Butler	572	40.5	
Independent	J Doyle	549	38.8	
Conservative	Silvia Dosser*	464	32.8	−16.5
Independent	Roger Baker*	395	27.9	−19.7
Labour	Ms E Rooney	372	26.3	+3.1
Conservative	Yvonne Fitzgerald-Finch	333	23.6	
Labour	Laurence Pollock	316	22.3	
Labour	R Harris	267	18.9	+0.1
Liberal Democrats	Ms D Gardiner	125	8.8	
Liberal Democrats	J Heley	118	8.3	
Liberal Democrats	G Riches	90	6.4	−13.5
Turnout		1,414	41.1	

=== Flitton, Greenfield & Pulloxhill ===
Flitton, Greenfield & Pulloxhill (1 seat, 1,493 registered voters)
Party	Candidate	Votes	%	±%
Independent	V Austin*	281	41.0	
Conservative	Ms J Eells	268	39.1	−30.7
Labour	C Uney	136	19.9	
Turnout		685	45.9	

=== Flitwick East ===
Flitwick East (2 seats, 4,062 registered voters)
Party	Candidate	Votes	%	±%
Labour	Paul Griffiths	736	50.5	
Labour	Maurice Layton	719	49.3	
Conservative	Cynthia Baker*	476	32.6	−24.4
Conservative	Sheila Forster	412	28.3	
Liberal Democrats	M Prior	217	14.9	
Liberal Democrats	S Sunman	154	10.6	−5.9
Turnout		1,458	35.9	−12.1

=== Flitwick West ===
Flitwick West (2 seats, 4,767 registered voters)
Party	Candidate	Votes	%	±%
Labour	Glen Pullen	899	52.0	
Labour	John Sutton	652	37.7	
Conservative	Dennis Gale*	589	34.0	−25.7
Conservative	John Forster*	554	32.0	−28.7
Liberal Democrats	G Mason	265	15.3	
Green	Roger Jones	220	12.7	
Turnout		1,730	36.3	

=== Harlington ===
Harlington (1 seat, 1,777 registered voters)
Party	Candidate	Votes	%	±%
Liberal Democrats	Brian Golby*	633	63.5	+13.2
Labour	Ms M Uney	232	23.3	
Conservative	J Goldsmith	128	12.8	
Turnout		997	56.1	

=== Haynes & Houghton Conquest ===
Haynes & Houghton Conquest (1 seat, 1,901 registered voters)
Party	Candidate	Votes	%	±%
Conservative	Eleanor Dorman*	461	53.8	
Labour	Paul Bouch	384	44.8	
Turnout		857	45.1	+8.6

=== Langford ===
Langford (1 seat, 2,175 registered voters)
Party	Candidate	Votes	%	±%
Labour	Joseph Mayes	546	62.5	
Conservative	Ms P Trussell	324	37.1	−10.6
Turnout		874	40.2	

=== Marston ===
Marston (2 seats, 3,383 registered voters)
Party	Candidate	Votes	%	±%
Independent	Isla Lake*	479	37.5	−17.8
Labour	Alan Morris	433	33.9	+8.4
Labour	D Teasdale	409	32.0	
Conservative	Darren Tysoe	399	31.2	
Liberal Democrats	C Caborn	193	15.1	
Liberal Democrats	Ms C Peachey-May	175	13.7	
Turnout		1,279	37.8	

=== Maulden ===
Maulden (1 seat, 2,074 registered voters)
Party	Candidate	Votes	%	±%
Labour	D Clark	484	49.2	
Conservative	Ms J Tucker	477	48.5	
Turnout		983	47.4	

=== Northill ===
Northill (1 seat, 1,663 registered voters)
Party	Candidate	Votes	%	±%
Conservative	Patricia Turner*	405	59.6	
Labour	Ms R Thomas	247	36.3	
Turnout		680	40.9	

=== Old Warden & Southill ===
Old Warden & Southill (1 seat, 1,163 registered voters)
Party	Candidate	Votes	%	±%
Conservative	K Ballard	261	51.3	
Labour	A Christie	246	48.3	
Turnout		509	43.8	

=== Potton ===
Potton (2 seats, 3,597 registered voters)
Party	Candidate	Votes	%	±%
Conservative	Doreen Gurney	539	39.1	
Conservative	Anita Lewis	536	38.9	
Labour	Nigel Butlin	508	36.9	
Labour	David Brittain	431	31.3	
Liberal Democrats	P Langridge	385	27.9	
Turnout		1,378	38.3	−11.7

=== Sandy All Saints ===
Sandy All Saints (2 seats, 2,853 registered voters)
Party	Candidate	Votes	%	±%
Independent	Anthony Goss*	664	64.5	+13.4
Conservative	Alistair Gammell*	553	53.7	−0.3
Labour	L Morris	253	24.6	
Labour	Arthur Lefford	243	23.6	
Turnout		1,030	36.1	

=== Sandy St Swithuns ===
Sandy St Swithuns (3 seats, 3,729 registered voters)
Party	Candidate	Votes	%	±%
Independent	John Gurney	774	53.1	
Liberal Democrats	Peter Blaine	570	39.1	
Labour	James Butler	492	33.7	
Labour	Ms J James	482	33.1	
Liberal Democrats	G Goodwin*	474	32.5	−9.2
Conservative	T Rice*	415	28.5	−13.1
Labour	Ms A Thompson	413	28.3	−2.0
Turnout		1,458	39.1	−17.4

=== Shefford ===
Shefford (2 seats, 2,986 registered voters)
Party	Candidate	Votes	%	±%
Liberal Democrats	Ms L McGregor	608	42.3	
Labour	Ms G Walker	537	37.4	
Conservative	G Potter	484	33.7	
Labour	Ellen Houliston	456	31.8	
Conservative	Anthony Brown	402	28.0	
Turnout		1,436	48.1	

=== Shillington & Stondon ===
Shillington & Stondon (2 seats, 2,733 registered voters)
Party	Candidate	Votes	%	±%
Labour	J Pickering	591	49.4	
Labour	M Woodbine	542	45.3	+10.5
Conservative	D Marshall	540	45.1	
Turnout		1,197	43.8	

=== Stotfold ===
Stotfold (3 seats, 4,731 registered voters)
Party	Candidate	Votes	%	±%
Conservative	John Street*	956	39.5	−14.3
Conservative	John Saunders*	927	38.3	−15.6
Conservative	Malcolm Smith	827	34.1	
Labour	C Arden	772	31.9	
Labour	R Harrold	752	31.0	
Labour	M Reeves	694	28.7	
Liberal Democrats	Brian Collier*	613	25.3	−7.2
Liberal Democrats	K Mutton	440	18.2	
Turnout		2,422	51.2	

=== Wensley ===
Wensley (1 seat, 1,363 registered voters)
Party	Candidate	Votes	%	±%
Conservative	Brian E Collier*	333	51.5	−5.4
Labour	Ms J Pates	311	48.1	
Turnout		647	47.5	

=== Westoning ===
Westoning (1 seat, 1,429 registered voters)
Party	Candidate	Votes	%	±%
Conservative	Andrew Rayment*	319	54.3	
Labour	D Abbott	269	45.8	
Turnout		587	41.1	

=== Woburn ===
Woburn (1 seat, 1,341 registered voters)
Party	Candidate	Votes	%	±%
Conservative	Anthony Duggan*	432	59.6	+0.2
Labour	J Ellis	211	29.1	−0.1
Liberal Democrats	Ms A Caborn	70	9.7	
Turnout		725	54.1	

=== Wrest ===
Wrest (1 seat, 1,823 registered voters)
Party	Candidate	Votes	%	±%
Independent	Ms M Taylor*	365	49.1	−20.6
Labour	Ms M Herod	237	31.9	
Liberal Democrats	M Dickins	135	18.1	−10.2
Turnout		744	40.8	
