= 1979 Mid Bedfordshire District Council election =

1979 UK local government election

← 1976	3 May 1979	1983 →

Whole Council 27 seats needed for a majority
- Registered: 70,014
- Turnout: 79%
	First party	Second party	Third party
Party	Conservative	Independent	Labour
Seats won	31	16	5
Popular vote	20,677	11,563	11,686
Percentage	43.4%	24.3%	24.5%
	Fourth party	Fifth party
Party	Ind. Conservative	Liberal
Seats won	1	0
Popular vote	2,086	1,631
Percentage	4.4%	5.4%
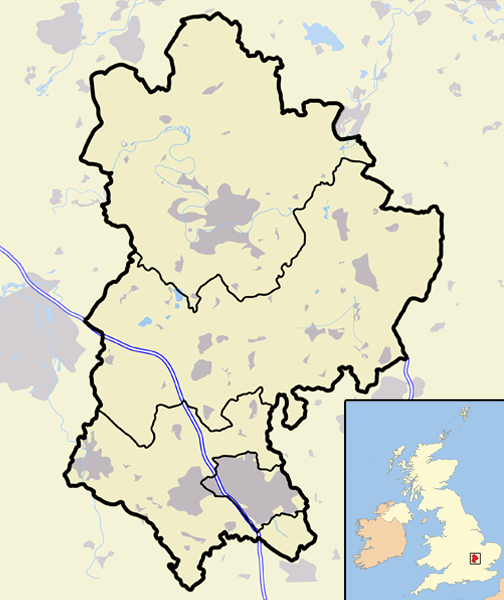
- Locations of wards in Mid Bedfordshire

Elections to Mid Bedfordshire District Council were held on 3 May 1979, on the same day as the general election, so turnout was higher than usual in district council elections for Mid Bedfordshire. All 53 seats were up for election.

== Result ==
There were now 53 seats on the council, compared with 49 in 1976. Gains and losses in the results table are compared with the 1976 district council election.

Mid Bedfordshire District Council Election Result 1979
Party	Seats	Gains	Losses	Net gain/loss	Seats %	Votes %	Votes	+/−
Conservative	31			+1	58.5	43.4	20,677	+0.1
Independent	16			+2	30.2	24.3	11,563	+0.3
Labour	5			+2	9.4	24.5	11,686	-1.2
Ind. Conservative	1			+1	1.9	4.4	2,086	+2.8
Liberal	0			-1	0.0	5.4	1,631	-2.0

== Ward results ==
All results are listed below:

Figures on turnout were taken from Plymouth University's Elections Centre, which gives the number of registered voters, and the percentage turnout for each ward. The number of ballots cast for each ward was calculated from these. Percentage change in turnout is compared with the same ward in the 1976 District Council election.

The percentage of the vote for each candidate was calculated compared with the number of ballots cast in the ward. Note that in a ward with more than one seat, voters were allowed to place as many crosses on the ballot paper as seats. The percentage change for each candidate is compared with the same candidate in the 1976 District Council election.

Candidates who were members of the council before the election are marked with an asterisk.

=== Ampthill ===
Ampthill (3 seats, 4,224 registered voters)
Party	Candidate	Votes	%	±%
Conservative	Ms A Cowell	1,728	51.8	
Conservative	Ms A Palmer*	1,566	46.9	+7.8
Labour	Ms G Wagstaff	1,480	44.4	+14.5
Conservative	B Soaper	1,399	41.9	
Liberal	Ms M Laycock	1,141	34.2	
Liberal	J Low	895	26.8	
Turnout		3,337	79.0	+6.0

=== Arlesey ===
Arlesey (2 seats, 2,762 registered voters)
Party	Candidate	Votes	%	±%
Conservative	Ms A Albon*	1,227	55.1	−0.9
Conservative	R Turner	1,028	46.2	+5.5
Labour	David Harrowell	995	44.7	
Labour	J Tizard	678	30.5	
Turnout		2,226	80.6	+29.5

=== Aspley ===
Aspley (2 seats, 2,376 registered voters)
Party	Candidate	Votes	%	±%
Independent	Ms A Melina	Unopposed	NA	
Independent	W Jaye	Unopposed	NA	

=== Biggleswade Ivel ===
Biggleswade Ivel (3 seats, 3,931 registered voters)
Party	Candidate	Votes	%	±%
Conservative	Ms F Killeen*	1,623	51.4	+18.8
Labour	L Chambers*	1,580	50.0	+18.7
Ind. Conservative	Patricia Rouse*	1,548	49.0	+19.3
Ind. Conservative	Ms M Armstrong	1,331	42.2	+17.5
Labour	Alistair Costley	1,077	34.1	+17.0
Labour	R McIlroy	857	27.1	
Turnout		3,157	80.3	−1.2

=== Biggleswade Stratton ===
Biggleswade Stratton (3 seats, 4,038 registered voters)
Party	Candidate	Votes	%	±%
Independent	Ms C Cook*	1,951	58.7	+22.7
Conservative	Richard Bennett*	1,743	52.4	+25.3
Labour	Victor Brunt*	1,448	43.6	+17.1
Conservative	J Dominey	1,090	32.8	
Labour	T Bornett	992	29.8	
Labour	P Milton	979	29.5	
Turnout		3,324	82.3	+0.8

=== Blunham ===
Blunham (1 seat, 1,531 registered voters)
Party	Candidate	Votes	%	±%
Conservative	Ms E Woods*	Unopposed	NA	

=== Campton & Meppershall ===
Campton & Meppershall (1 seat, 1,309 registered voters)
Party	Candidate	Votes	%	±%
Conservative	J Buxton*	Unopposed	NA	

=== Clifton & Henlow ===
Clifton & Henlow (3 seats, 3,599 registered voters)
Party	Candidate	Votes	%	±%
Conservative	Geoffrey Rogers*	1,556	57.4	+21.5
Conservative	F Burrows*	1,495	55.1	+13.1
Independent	William Cliff*	1,464	54.0	+32.4
Conservative	Patricia Cook	1,314	48.4	+13.0
Turnout		2,713	75.4	

=== Clophill ===
Clophill (1 seat, 1,207 registered voters)
Party	Candidate	Votes	%	±%
Conservative	W Russell*	Unopposed	NA	

=== Cranfield ===
Cranfield (3 seats, 3,100 registered voters)
Party	Candidate	Votes	%	±%
Conservative	J Hawksby	1,321	55.3	
Independent	J Salisbury*	1,312	55.0	
Conservative	R Palmer	1,167	48.9	
Conservative	J Sullivan	726	30.4	
Turnout		2,387	77.0	

=== Flitton, Greenfield & Pulloxhill ===
Flitton, Greenfield & Pulloxhill (1 seat, 1,297 registered voters)
Party	Candidate	Votes	%	±%
Conservative	Ms J Eells*	Unopposed	NA	

=== Flitwick East ===
Flitwick East (2 seats, 3,169 registered voters)
Party	Candidate	Votes	%	±%
Conservative	Malcolm Randall*	1,488	59.0	−6.3
Conservative	Jack Cowell	1,345	53.3	
Labour	Ms F Rolls	933	37.0	+2.3
Turnout		2,522	79.6	

=== Flitwick West ===
Flitwick West (2 seats, 1,989 registered voters)
Party	Candidate	Votes	%	±%
Conservative	A Saxby	Unopposed	NA	
Conservative	Dennis Gale*	Unopposed	NA	

=== Harlington ===
Harlington (1 seat, 1,770 registered voters)
Party	Candidate	Votes	%	±%
Conservative	A Giles*	775	52.3	
Independent	E Preston	344	23.2	
Independent	J McFadden	198	13.4	
Labour	L Ragless	127	8.6	
Turnout		1,481	83.7	

=== Haynes & Houghton Conquest ===
Haynes & Houghton Conquest (1 seat, 1,665 registered voters)
Party	Candidate	Votes	%	±%
Independent	H Craddock*	Unopposed	NA	

=== Langford ===
Langford (1 seat, 1,912 registered voters)
Party	Candidate	Votes	%	±%
Conservative	G Gates*	915	56.7	+18.0
Labour	A Loney	677	42.0	+20.8
Turnout		1,613	84.4	

=== Marston ===
Marston (2 seats, 3,149 registered voters)
Party	Candidate	Votes	%	±%
Conservative	Ms C Barnes*	1,188	48.1	−13.7
Labour	D Towell	1,176	47.6	
Conservative	Fiona Chapman* (Note: Mrs Chapman's full name is Catherine Fiona Chapman MBE. Since 2009 she has been councillor for Flitwick on Central Bedfordshire Council, and is listed on Central Bedfordshire Council's website as Cllr Mrs C Fiona Chapman MBE. She is sometimes listed as Catherine Chapman, and sometimes as Fiona Chapman. She was first elected to Mid Bedfordshire District Council in 1976.)	927	37.5	−19.5
Labour	Ms R Martin	757	30.7	
Turnout		2,469	78.4	

=== Maulden ===
Maulden (1 seat, 1,875 registered voters)
Party	Candidate	Votes	%	±%
Independent	Ms I Robinson*	914	60.3	−26.9
Ind. Conservative	Howard Lockey	538	35.5	
Turnout		1,517	80.9	+34.5

=== Northill ===
Northill (1 seat, 1,521 registered voters)
Party	Candidate	Votes	%	±%
Conservative	Patricia Turner*	Unopposed	NA	

=== Old Warden & Southill ===
Old Warden & Southill (1 seat, 1,168 registered voters)
Party	Candidate	Votes	%	±%
Independent	Ms M Hamer-Harries	439	51.8	+15.8
Conservative	Ms S Pool	400	47.2	
Turnout		848	72.6	+22.6

=== Potton ===
Potton (2 seats, 2,901 registered voters)
Party	Candidate	Votes	%	±%
Conservative	J Ream*	Unopposed	NA	
Independent	F Jakes*	Unopposed	NA	

=== Sandy All Saints ===
Sandy All Saints (2 seats, 2,527 registered voters)
Party	Candidate	Votes	%	±%
Conservative	Alistair Gammell*	1,262	63.4	+25.8
Conservative	A Sherwood-King*	1,203	60.4	+18.5
Labour	I Kirkwood	562	28.2	
Labour	Ms J Monahan	521	26.2	+12.8
Turnout		1,991	78.8	+11.2

=== Sandy St Swithuns ===
Sandy St Swithuns (3 seats, 2,828 registered voters)
Party	Candidate	Votes	%	±%
Independent	K Quince*	1,115	50.9	+10.0
Conservative	N Davidson	928	42.4	
Independent	E Smith	864	39.5	
Labour	L Cameron	813	37.1	
Labour	P Monahan	710	32.4	+15.3
Labour	W Hibbert	591	27.0	+23.9
Turnout		2,189	77.4	+9.8

=== Shefford ===
Shefford (2 seats, 2,108 registered voters)
Party	Candidate	Votes	%	±%
Conservative	Ms A Gouldsbrough	770	45.3	
Independent	A Smyth	723	42.6	
Conservative	D Cadman	677	39.8	+3.2
Independent	Ms M Faircloth	497	29.3	+16.2
Labour	Ms G Emmerson	212	12.5	+2.6
Labour	Ms R McIlroy	196	11.5	
Turnout		1,699	80.6	

=== Shillington & Stondon ===
Shillington & Stondon (2 seats, 2,588 registered voters)
Party	Candidate	Votes	%	±%
Independent	R Roe*	1,120	54.3	
Independent	S Burr	820	39.7	
Conservative	D Simkins	714	34.6	
Conservative	P Parrish	691	33.5	
Turnout		2,063	79.7	

=== Stotfold ===
Stotfold (3 seats, 4,467 registered voters)
Party	Candidate	Votes	%	±%
Conservative	J Long*	1,958	60.5	+26.3
Labour	H Wood	1,683	52.0	+20.8
Independent	F Hyde*	1,600	49.4	+14.6
Independent	R Watkins	1,493	46.1	+15.8
Turnout		3,239	72.5	+19.1

=== Wensley ===
Wensley (1 seat, 1,217 registered voters)
Party	Candidate	Votes	%	±%
Conservative	W Goodyer*	519	51.1	−5.4
Liberal	C Riches	490	48.2	
Turnout		1,016	83.5	

=== Westoning ===
Westoning (1 seat, 1,188 registered voters)
Party	Candidate	Votes	%	±%
Conservative	Jean Kent*	Unopposed	NA	

=== Woburn ===
Woburn (1 seat, 1,180 registered voters)
Party	Candidate	Votes	%	±%
Conservative	D Woodward*	562	58.5	+18.2
Independent	J Ellis	383	39.9	+11.7
Turnout		961	81.4	+19.6

=== Wrest ===
Wrest (1 seat, 1,418 registered voters)
Party	Candidate	Votes	%	±%
Independent	G Wood*	Unopposed	NA	
