= 2003 Mid Bedfordshire District Council election =

2003 UK local government election

← 1999	1 May 2003	2007 →

53 seats for Whole Council 27 seats needed for a majority
- Registered: 94,569
- Turnout: 33%
	First party	Second party	Third party
Party	Conservative	Liberal Democrats	Independent
Seats won	37	11	4
Popular vote	12,794	7,497	2,466
Percentage	41.9%	24.6%	8.1%
	Fourth party	Fifth party
Party	Labour	Green
Seats won	1	0
Popular vote	6,726	1,053
Percentage	22.0%	3.4%
- Results by ward

Elections to Mid Bedfordshire District Council were held on 1 May 2003. All 53 seats were up for election. Councillors elected would serve a four-year term, expiring in 2007. The Conservative Party retained overall control of the council, winning 37 of 53 seats on the council. The Conservatives won 7 seats (5 wards) unopposed.

== Result ==
Mid Bedfordshire District Council Election Result 2003
Party	Seats	Gains	Losses	Net gain/loss	Seats %	Votes %	Votes	+/−
Conservative	37				69.81	41.9	12,794	-3.8
Liberal Democrats	11				20.75	24.6	7,497	+5.9
Independent	4				7.55	8.1	2,466	-0.2
Labour	1				1.89	22.0	6,726	-5.4
Green	0				0.0	3.4	1,053	+3.4

== Ward results ==
All results are listed below:

This election was the first with the new ward boundaries.

Figures on turnout were taken from Plymouth University's Elections Centre, which gives the number of registered voters, and the percentage turnout for each ward. The number of ballots cast for each ward was calculated from these. Percentage change in turnout is compared with the same ward in the 1999 District Council election.

The percentage of the vote for each candidate was calculated compared with the number of ballots cast in the ward. Note that in a ward with more than one seat, voters were allowed to place as many crosses on the ballot paper as seats. The percentage change for each candidate is compared with the same candidate in the 1999 District Council election.

Candidates who were members of the council before the election are marked with an asterisk.

=== Ampthill ===
Ampthill (3 seats, 5,335 registered voters)
Party	Candidate	Votes	%	±%
Liberal Democrats	Gary Summerfield*	1,179	59.2	
Liberal Democrats	Mark Cathrall	949	47.7	
Conservative	Richard Holden*	823	41.4	+0.1
Labour	Mark Smith	704	35.4	
Conservative	Jeremy Jones	580	29.1	
Conservative	John Stratton	489	24.6	
Green	Gavin Harrison	370	18.6	
Turnout		1,990	37.3	−0.2

=== Arlesey ===
Arlesey (2 seats, 3,832 registered voters)
Party	Candidate	Votes	%	±%
Independent	Victor Williams*	607	62.4	+9.0
Labour	Dorothy Brown	492	50.6	
Conservative	Peter Woodward	344	35.4	
Independent	David West	127	13.1	
Turnout		973	25.4	−2.1

=== Aspley Guise ===
Aspley Guise (1 seat, 1,946 registered voters)
Party	Candidate	Votes	%	±%
Conservative	Fiona Chapman* (Note: Mrs Chapman's full name is Catherine Fiona Chapman MBE. Since 2009 she has been councillor for Flitwick on Central Bedfordshire Council, and is listed on Central Bedfordshire Council's website as Cllr Mrs C Fiona Chapman MBE. She is sometimes listed as Catherine Chapman, and sometimes as Fiona Chapman. She was first elected to Mid Bedfordshire District Council in 1976.)	Unopposed	NA	

=== Biggleswade Holme ===
Biggleswade Holme (2 seats, 3,617 registered voters)
Party	Candidate	Votes	%	±%
Conservative	David Smith*	549	42.8	
Conservative	Peter Vickers*	525	40.9	−2.2
Liberal Democrats	Margaret Bracey	399	31.1	+8.8
Labour	Rose Forbes	345	26.9	
Liberal Democrats	Anthony Baines	309	24.1	
Labour	Alistair Costley*	305	23.8	−26.0
Turnout		1,284	35.5	

=== Biggleswade Ivel ===
Biggleswade Ivel (3 seats, 5,494 registered voters)
Party	Candidate	Votes	%	±%
Conservative	Maurice Jones	645	42.9	
Conservative	Patricia Rouse	634	42.1	+2.0
Conservative	Jane Lawrence	614	40.8	
Labour	Bernard Briars	594	39.5	
Labour	Rex Skinner*	535	35.5	−13.0
Labour	Hilary Broderick*	527	35.0	−4.7
Liberal Democrats	Gary Laver	268	17.8	
Liberal Democrats	Glenys Leach	238	15.8	
Turnout		1,505	27.4	−4.5

=== Biggleswade Stratton ===
Biggleswade Stratton (2 seats, 2,723 registered voters)
Party	Candidate	Votes	%	±%
Conservative	David Lawrence	335	46.8	+8.4
Conservative	Michael Cazaly	331	46.2	+8.8
Labour	Rebecca Kerfoot	266	37.2	
Labour	Kevin Merrett	240	33.5	−5.6
Liberal Democrats	Stephen Hartwell	145	20.3	
Turnout		716	26.3	−3.8

=== Clifton and Meppershall ===
Clifton and Meppershall (2 seats, 3,388 registered voters)
Party	Candidate	Votes	%	±%
Conservative	Anthony Rogers*	758	56.4	
Conservative	Paul Carne	709	52.7	
Liberal Democrats	Pauline Livesey	537	39.9	−0.7
Labour	David Devereux	283	21.0	−2.5
Turnout		1,345	39.7	

=== Cranfield ===
Cranfield (2 seats, 4,084 registered voters)
Party	Candidate	Votes	%	±%
Conservative	Kenneth Matthews*	737	62.9	+23.3
Conservative	Alan Bastable	705	60.2	+30.5
Labour	Alan Morris	368	31.4	
Labour	Laurence Pollock	342	29.2	+2.4
Turnout		1,172	28.7	−1.2

=== Flitton, Greenfield and Pulloxhill ===
Flitton, Greenfield and Pulloxhill (1 seat, 1,668 registered voters)
Party	Candidate	Votes	%	±%
Conservative	David Thompson*	335	54.5	
Green	Richard Ellis	280	45.5	
Turnout		615	36.9	

=== Flitwick East ===
Flitwick East (2 seats, 4,131 registered voters)
Party	Candidate	Votes	%	±%
Liberal Democrats	Andrew Lee	496	42.0	
Liberal Democrats	John Watton	440	37.3	+11.6
Conservative	Rowland Goodman*	376	31.8	−20.1
Conservative	Jack North	330	27.9	
Labour	Paul Griffiths*	294	24.9	−23.2
Green	Marina Torselli	216	18.3	
Turnout		1,181	28.6	+0.9

=== Flitwick West ===
Flitwick West (3 seats, 5,803 registered voters)
Party	Candidate	Votes	%	±%
Conservative	Dennis Gale*	1,012	61.0	+18.8
Conservative	James Gardner*	974	58.7	+18.0
Conservative	Stephen Male	927	55.8	
Labour	Heather Mallett	574	34.6	
Labour	Maurice Layton	538	32.4	−13.8
Labour	Glen Pullen	534	32.2	+1.5
Turnout		1,660	28.6	−0.7

=== Harlington ===
Harlington (1 seat, 1,790 registered voters)
Party	Candidate	Votes	%	±%
Liberal Democrats	Brian Golby*	747	86.6	+1.0
Conservative	Andrew Langham	108	12.5	
Turnout		863	48.2	−1.2

=== Houghton, Haynes, Southill and Old Warden ===
Houghton, Haynes, Southill and Old Warden (2 seats, 3,164 registered voters)
Party	Candidate	Votes	%	±%
Conservative	Rodney Bowdidge*	Unopposed	NA	
Conservative	Neal Capon*	Unopposed	NA	

=== Langford and Henlow Village ===
Langford and Henlow Village (2 seats, 3,754 registered voters)
Party	Candidate	Votes	%	±%
Liberal Democrats	William Cliff*	738	46.3	+0.3
Liberal Democrats	Sonia Sewell	588	36.9	
Conservative	Steven Dixon	581	36.4	
Conservative	Philip Wright	576	36.1	
Labour	David Handscombe	328	20.6	
Turnout		1,595	42.5	

=== Marston ===
Marston (2 seats, 3,860 registered voters)
Party	Candidate	Votes	%	±%
Conservative	Darren Tysoe*	651	63.9	+11.9
Conservative	Simon Prince	626	61.4	
Labour	Elizabeth Rooney	291	28.6	+1.5
Labour	Richard Greenough	286	28.1	
Turnout		1,019	26.4	−4.7

=== Maulden and Clophill ===
Maulden and Clophill (2 seats, 3,543 registered voters)
Party	Candidate	Votes	%	±%
Conservative	Howard Lockey*	852	55.9	−2.3
Conservative	Martin Hawkins*	791	51.9	−22.2
Liberal Democrats	Bettina Fitt	469	30.8	
Labour	Geoffrey Thorp	272	17.9	
Labour	Terry Shanahan	267	17.5	
Turnout		1,523	43.0	

=== Northill and Blunham ===
Northill and Blunham (2 seats, 3,483 registered voters)
Party	Candidate	Votes	%	±%
Conservative	Joanna Davison*	Unopposed	NA	
Conservative	Patricia Turner*	Unopposed	NA	

=== Potton and Wensley ===
Potton and Wensley (3 seats, 5,527 registered voters)
Party	Candidate	Votes	%	±%
Conservative	Doreen Gurney*	1,118	59.9	+1.2
Conservative	Anita Lewis*	1,096	58.7	−2.1
Conservative	John Lewis	986	52.8	
Labour	Patrick Heskins	743	39.8	
Turnout		1,868	33.8	

=== Sandy Ivel ===
Sandy Ivel (2 seats, 3,486 registered voters)
Party	Candidate	Votes	%	±%
Independent	John Gurney*	691	64.8	+13.6
Conservative	Alistair Gammell*	553	51.8	−7.7
Independent	Anthony Goss*	396	37.1	−14.2
Green	Paul Wheatley	187	17.5	
Turnout		1,067	30.6	

=== Sandy Pinnacle ===
Sandy Pinnacle (3 seats, 4,904 registered voters)
Party	Candidate	Votes	%	±%
Liberal Democrats	Peter Blaine*	871	61.3	+22.9
Independent	Max McMurdo*	722	50.8	+9.2
Liberal Democrats	Peter Aldis	637	44.8	
Conservative	Michael Scott	370	26.0	
Conservative	Robert Smith	325	22.9	
Labour	Natasha Hetherington	240	16.9	
Labour	Drosten Fisher	213	15.0	
Turnout		1,422	29.0	

=== Shefford, Campton and Gravenhurst ===
Shefford, Campton and Gravenhurst (3 seats, 5,151 registered voters)
Party	Candidate	Votes	%	±%
Conservative	Lewis Birt*	802	49.8	+1.0
Conservative	Anthony Brown*	769	47.7	+2.9
Liberal Democrats	Mark Chapman	670	41.6	
Conservative	Ashley Green	639	39.6	
Labour	Carolyn Devereux	505	31.3	−4.8
Turnout		1,612	31.3	

=== Shillington, Stondon and Henlow Camp ===
Shillington, Stondon and Henlow Camp (2 seats, 3,774 registered voters)
Party	Candidate	Votes	%	±%
Conservative	Rita Drinkwater*	864	70.4	+12.0
Conservative	Anthony Whiteman*	710	57.9	+7.3
Labour	Andrea Wilson	344	28.0	
Labour	Janet Mallett	306	24.9	
Turnout		1,227	32.5	

=== Silsoe ===
Silsoe (1 seat, 1,391 registered voters)
Party	Candidate	Votes	%	±%
Conservative	Kathleen Keen*	Unopposed	NA	

=== Stotfold ===
Stotfold (3 seats, 4,998 registered voters)
Party	Candidate	Votes	%	±%
Conservative	John Street*	981	58.3	+0.8
Liberal Democrats	Brian Collier*	978	58.1	+2.3
Conservative	John Saunders	821	48.8	−3.3
Conservative	Peter Evans	815	48.4	+6.4
Turnout		1,684	33.7	−4.3

=== Westoning and Tingrith ===
Westoning and Tingrith (1 seat, 1,656 registered voters)
Party	Candidate	Votes	%	±%
Independent	Andrew Rayment* (Note: Andrew Rayment stood successfully for the Conservatives in this ward in the 1995 and 1999 elections, and was one of the nominators of the Conservative candidate for Mid Bedfordshire in the 2017 general election.)	446	83.4	+7.2
Labour	Jean Pullen	83	15.5	
Turnout		535	32.3	

=== Woburn ===
Woburn (1 seat, 2,067 registered voters)
Party	Candidate	Votes	%	±%
Conservative	Anthony Duggan*	Unopposed	NA	
