= 1991 Mid Bedfordshire District Council election =

1991 UK local government election

← 1987	2 May 1991	1995 →

Whole Council 27 seats needed for a majority
- Registered: 81,609
- Turnout: 45%
	First party	Second party	Third party
Party	Conservative	Independent	Labour
Seats won	40	7	3
Popular vote	16,791	4,358	8,389
Percentage	49.1%	12.7%	24.5%
	Fourth party
Party	Liberal Democrats
Seats won	3
Popular vote	4,651
Percentage	13.6%
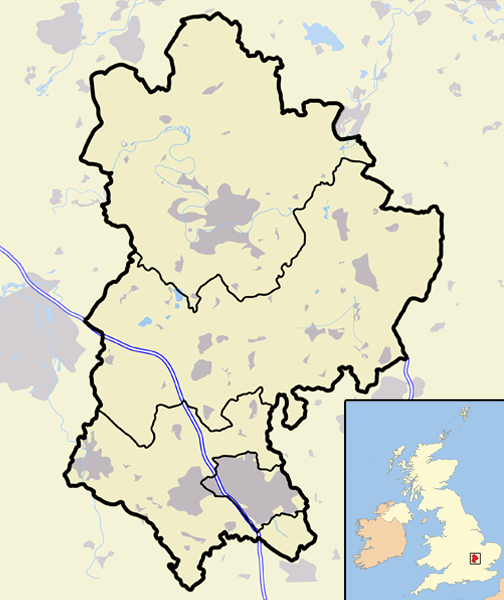
- Locations of wards in Mid Bedfordshire

Elections to Mid Bedfordshire District Council were held on 2 May 1991. All 53 seats were up for election.

== Result ==
Gains and losses in the results table are compared with the 1987 district council election.

Mid Bedfordshire District Council Election Result 1991
Party	Seats	Gains	Losses	Net gain/loss	Seats %	Votes %	Votes	+/−
Conservative	40			-3	75.5	49.1	16,791	-4.9
Independent	7			+2	13.2	12.7	4,358	+3.0
Labour	3			+1	5.7	24.5	8,389	+4.6
Liberal Democrats	3			+0	5.7	13.6	4,651	-1.5

== Ward results ==
All results are listed below:

Figures on turnout were taken from Plymouth University's Elections Centre, which gives the number of registered voters, and the percentage turnout for each ward. The number of ballots cast for each ward was calculated from these. Percentage change in turnout is compared with the same ward in the 1987 District Council election.

The percentage of the vote for each candidate was calculated compared with the number of ballots cast in the ward. Note that in a ward with more than one seat, voters were allowed to place as many crosses on the ballot paper as seats. The percentage change for each candidate is compared with the same candidate in the 1987 District Council election.

Candidates who were members of the council before the election are marked with an asterisk.

=== Ampthill ===
Ampthill (3 seats, 4,870 registered voters)
Party	Candidate	Votes	%	±%
Conservative	Richard Holden*	1,302	62.2	+23.0
Conservative	Ms A Palmer*	1,000	47.8	+9.8
Conservative	Pauline Mayhead	881	42.1	
Liberal Democrats	Susan Young*	817	39.0	+5.8
Liberal Democrats	A Sunman	599	28.6	
Labour	Ms N Bradbury	428	20.4	
Labour	Ms J Nicklin	350	16.7	+8.1
Labour	Ms C Urquart	348	16.6	
Turnout		2,094	43.0	−29.3

=== Arlesey ===
Arlesey (2 seats, 3,334 registered voters)
Party	Candidate	Votes	%	±%
Labour	David Harrowell*	865	59.0	+8.2
Labour	D Landman	616	42.0	
Conservative	R Turner*	613	41.8	−7.5
Conservative	M Covington	538	36.7	
Turnout		1,467	44.0	

=== Aspley ===
Aspley (2 seats, 2,693 registered voters)
Party	Candidate	Votes	%	±%
Conservative	Fiona Chapman* (Note: Mrs Chapman's full name is Catherine Fiona Chapman MBE. Since 2009 she has been councillor for Flitwick on Central Bedfordshire Council, and is listed on Central Bedfordshire Council's website as Cllr Mrs C Fiona Chapman MBE. She is sometimes listed as Catherine Chapman, and sometimes as Fiona Chapman. She was first elected to Mid Bedfordshire District Council in 1976.)	749	57.9	+5.2
Conservative	Robert Brown*	696	53.8	+6.4
Liberal Democrats	M Dickins	366	28.3	
Labour	A Bassindale	323	25.0	
Turnout		1,293	48.0	

=== Biggleswade Ivel ===
Biggleswade Ivel (3 seats, 4,934 registered voters)
Party	Candidate	Votes	%	±%
Conservative	Patricia Rouse*	1,379	59.5	−0.2
Conservative	Peter Vickers*	1,264	54.5	−1.9
Conservative	D Strachan*	1,061	45.8	+3.2
Labour	M Peirce	877	37.8	
Labour	Ms C Bowpitt	823	35.5	
Labour	Peter Malyon	755	32.6	+6.7
Turnout		2,319	47.0	

=== Biggleswade Stratton ===
Biggleswade Stratton (3 seats, 4,948 registered voters)
Party	Candidate	Votes	%	±%
Conservative	Richard Bennett*	1,208	50.9	+10.0
Conservative	David Smith*	1,143	48.1	+10.9
Labour	Ms D Brunt	1,071	45.1	
Independent	Ms C Cook*	921	38.8	+8.7
Labour	Ms A Briars	886	37.3	
Labour	Amy Forbes	731	30.8	+12.8
Turnout		2,375	48.0	

=== Blunham ===
Blunham (1 seat, 1,589 registered voters)
Party	Candidate	Votes	%	±%
Independent	N Davidson*	Unopposed	NA	

=== Campton & Meppershall ===
Campton & Meppershall (1 seat, 1,436 registered voters)
Party	Candidate	Votes	%	±%
Conservative	D Price*	Unopposed	NA	

=== Clifton & Henlow ===
Clifton & Henlow (3 seats, 4,118 registered voters)
Party	Candidate	Votes	%	±%
Conservative	Geoffrey Rogers*	1,027	62.4	+1.6
Independent	William Cliff	940	57.1	
Conservative	Patricia Cook*	889	54.0	−4.4
Conservative	Ms G Burn*	733	44.5	−11.0
Turnout		1,647	40.0	

=== Clophill ===
Clophill (1 seat, 1,243 registered voters)
Party	Candidate	Votes	%	±%
Independent	Robert Dunne	374	74.4	
Labour	D Mason	129	25.6	
Turnout		503	40.5	

=== Cranfield ===
Cranfield (3 seats, 3,102 registered voters)
Party	Candidate	Votes	%	±%
Conservative	Silvia Dosser	658	49.3	
Conservative	M Clarke*	656	49.2	
Conservative	Roger Baker	636	47.7	
Labour	Alan Morris	340	25.5	+9.2
Labour	Ms E Rooney	309	23.2	+6.3
Liberal Democrats	J Hamilton	306	22.9	+3.9
Labour	R Harris	250	18.7	+3.9
Independent	R Ambridge	211	15.8	
Turnout		1,334	43.0	

=== Flitton, Greenfield & Pulloxhill ===
Flitton, Greenfield & Pulloxhill (1 seat, 1,410 registered voters)
Party	Candidate	Votes	%	±%
Conservative	Ms J Eells*	484	69.8	−13.1
Labour	Ms S McDonald	209	30.2	
Turnout		693	49.1	

=== Flitwick East ===
Flitwick East (2 seats, 3,934 registered voters)
Party	Candidate	Votes	%	±%
Conservative	Cynthia Baker*	786	57.1	−1.0
Conservative	Malcolm Randall*	615	44.7	−23.6
Labour	P Bray	530	38.5	
Turnout		1,377	35.0	

=== Flitwick West ===
Flitwick West (2 seats, 4,292 registered voters)
Party	Candidate	Votes	%	±%
Conservative	John Forster	1,042	60.7	
Conservative	Dennis Gale*	1,026	59.8	+1.6
Labour	Ms J Newman	497	28.9	
Labour	Arthur Watson	467	27.2	+17.0
Turnout		1,717	40.0	

=== Harlington ===
Harlington (1 seat, 1,813 registered voters)
Party	Candidate	Votes	%	±%
Liberal Democrats	Brian Golby*	574	50.3	−0.4
Conservative	Robin Younger	385	33.7	
Labour	M Howson	182	16.0	
Turnout		1,141	62.9	

=== Haynes & Houghton Conquest ===
Haynes & Houghton Conquest (1 seat, 1,938 registered voters)
Party	Candidate	Votes	%	±%
Conservative	Eleanor Dorman*	Unopposed	NA	

=== Langford ===
Langford (1 seat, 2,157 registered voters)
Party	Candidate	Votes	%	±%
Conservative	Ms P Trussell*	492	47.7	−6.0
Liberal Democrats	D Hanscombe	308	29.8	+4.3
Labour	Ms J Scholes	232	22.5	
Turnout		1,032	47.8	−1.9

=== Marston ===
Marston (2 seats, 3,176 registered voters)
Party	Candidate	Votes	%	±%
Conservative	Ms C Barnes*	876	61.3	+13.2
Conservative	Isla Lake*	789	55.2	
Labour	L Pollock	302	21.1	
Liberal Democrats	G Riches	284	19.9	
Labour	Ms M Crick	278	19.5	
Turnout		1,429	45.0	

=== Maulden ===
Maulden (1 seat, 2,048 registered voters)
Party	Candidate	Votes	%	±%
Conservative	Ms B New*	658	67.3	+11.8
Liberal Democrats	S Sunman	161	16.5	
Labour	Ms M Mason	159	16.3	
Turnout		978	47.8	

=== Northill ===
Northill (1 seat, 1,639 registered voters)
Party	Candidate	Votes	%	±%
Conservative	Patricia Turner*	Unopposed	NA	

=== Old Warden & Southill ===
Old Warden & Southill (1 seat, 1,147 registered voters)
Party	Candidate	Votes	%	±%
Liberal Democrats	K Ballard	Unopposed	NA	

=== Potton ===
Potton (2 seats, 3,542 registered voters)
Party	Candidate	Votes	%	±%
Independent	F Jakes*	Unopposed	NA	
Independent	J Ream*	Unopposed	NA	

=== Sandy All Saints ===
Sandy All Saints (2 seats, 2,900 registered voters)
Party	Candidate	Votes	%	±%
Conservative	Alistair Gammell*	572	54.0	
Independent	Anthony Goss	541	51.1	
Conservative	A Sherwood-King*	484	45.7	
Turnout		1,059	36.5	

=== Sandy St Swithuns ===
Sandy St Swithuns (3 seats, 3,766 registered voters)
Party	Candidate	Votes	%	±%
Conservative	Ms P Sherwood-King*	621	45.8	
Liberal Democrats	G Goodwin	565	41.7	−1.6
Conservative	T Rice	563	41.5	−9.3
Conservative	M D Darlow	502	37.0	
Labour	J Ball	470	34.7	
Labour	Ms D Rescorla*	440	32.4	
Turnout		1,356	36.0	−39.8

=== Shefford ===
Shefford (2 seats, 2,554 registered voters)
Party	Candidate	Votes	%	±%
Conservative	Ms E Burson*	781	62.4	+25.5
Independent	Ms M Faircloth*	590	47.2	+20.4
Labour	Ms F Argent	346	27.7	
Labour	Ms M Gardiner	258	20.6	
Turnout		1,251	49.0	

=== Shillington & Stondon ===
Shillington & Stondon (2 seats, 2,681 registered voters)
Party	Candidate	Votes	%	±%
Conservative	Ms R Simkins*	662	57.4	+15.4
Conservative	W Bell*	636	55.2	
Labour	M Woodbine	401	34.8	+27.8
Turnout		1,153	43.0	

=== Stotfold ===
Stotfold (3 seats, 4,775 registered voters)
Party	Candidate	Votes	%	±%
Conservative	John Saunders	1,287	53.9	
Conservative	John Street	1,283	53.7	
Liberal Democrats	Brian Collier	776	32.5	
Labour	H Wood*	766	32.1	
Independent	F Hyde*	703	29.4	
Independent	J Keenan	218	9.1	
Turnout		2,388	50.0	

=== Wensley ===
Wensley (1 seat, 1,310 registered voters)
Party	Candidate	Votes	%	±%
Conservative	Brian E Collier*	377	56.9	−5.2
Liberal Democrats	D Walker	286	43.1	+21.0
Turnout		663	50.6	

=== Westoning ===
Westoning (1 seat, 1,307 registered voters)
Party	Candidate	Votes	%	±%
Conservative	J Goldsmith	Unopposed	NA	

=== Woburn ===
Woburn (1 seat, 1,264 registered voters)
Party	Candidate	Votes	%	±%
Conservative	Anthony Duggan	423	59.4	
Liberal Democrats	J Ellis	208	29.2	+11.1
Independent	A Wells	78	11.0	
Turnout		712	56.3	

=== Wrest ===
Wrest (1 seat, 1,689 registered voters)
Party	Candidate	Votes	%	±%
Conservative	Ms M Taylor	601	69.6	
Labour	Ms A Thompson	262	30.4	
Turnout		863	51.1	
