= 1983 Mid Bedfordshire District Council election =

1983 UK local government election

← 1979	5 May 1983	1987 →

53 seats for Whole Council 27 seats needed for a majority
- Registered: 76,062
- Turnout: 56%
	First party	Second party	Third party
Party	Conservative	Independent	Labour
Seats won	36	9	7
Popular vote	15,709	6,243	8,260
Percentage	46.6%	18.5%	24.5%
	Fourth party
Party	Alliance
Seats won	1
Popular vote	3,478
Percentage	10.3%
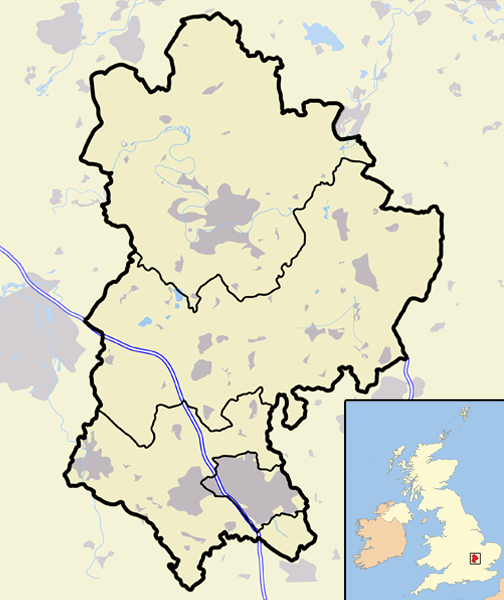
- Locations of wards in Mid Bedfordshire

Elections to Mid Bedfordshire District Council were held on 5 May 1983. All 53 seats were up for election.

== Result ==
Gains and losses in the results table are compared with the 1979 district council election.

Mid Bedfordshire District Council Election Result 1983
Party	Seats	Gains	Losses	Net gain/loss	Seats %	Votes %	Votes	+/−
Conservative	36			+5	67.9	46.6	15,709	+3.2
Independent	9			-7	17.0	18.5	6,243	-5.8
Labour	7			+2	13.2	24.5	8,260	+0.0
Alliance	1			+1	1.9	10.3	3,478	+6.9

== Ward results ==
All results are listed below:

Figures on turnout were taken from Plymouth University's Elections Centre, which gives the number of registered voters, and the percentage turnout for each ward. The number of ballots cast for each ward was calculated from these. Percentage change in turnout is compared with the same ward in the 1979 District Council election.

The percentage of the vote for each candidate was calculated compared with the number of ballots cast in the ward. Note that in a ward with more than one seat, voters were allowed to place as many crosses on the ballot paper as seats. The percentage change for each candidate is compared with the same candidate in the 1979 District Council election.

Candidates who were members of the council before the election are marked with an asterisk.

=== Ampthill ===
Ampthill (3 seats, 4,368 registered voters)
Party	Candidate	Votes	%	±%
Conservative	Ms A Cowell*	1,145	36.2	−15.6
Labour	Ms G Wagstaff*	1,073	33.9	−10.5
Conservative	Ms A Palmer*	1,030	32.5	−14.4
Alliance	P Cruse	949	30.0	
Alliance	J Letch	643	20.3	
Turnout		3,167	72.5	−6.5

=== Arlesey ===
Arlesey (2 seats, 3,003 registered voters)
Party	Candidate	Votes	%	±%
Labour	David Harrowell	801	52.8	+8.1
Conservative	R Turner*	715	47.1	+1.0
Conservative	Ms A Albon*	636	41.9	−13.2
Labour	Ms G Walker	469	30.9	
Turnout		1,517	50.5	

=== Aspley ===
Aspley (2 seats, 2,468 registered voters)
Party	Candidate	Votes	%	±%
Conservative	Fiona Chapman (Note: Mrs Chapman's full name is Catherine Fiona Chapman MBE. Since 2009 she has been councillor for Flitwick on Central Bedfordshire Council, and is listed on Central Bedfordshire Council's website as Cllr Mrs C Fiona Chapman MBE. She is sometimes listed as Catherine Chapman, and sometimes as Fiona Chapman. She was first elected to Mid Bedfordshire District Council in 1976.)	746	44.9	+7.3
Alliance	Ms A Crampin	475	28.6	
Independent	H Jaye*	442	26.6	
Turnout		1,663	67.4	

=== Biggleswade Ivel ===
Biggleswade Ivel (3 seats, 4,477 registered voters)
Party	Candidate	Votes	%	±%
Conservative	Peter Vickers	1,237	43.7	
Labour	L Chambers*	1,000	35.3	−14.7
Conservative	D Strachan	867	30.6	
Conservative	Patricia Rouse*	859	30.4	−18.7
Labour	H Smeeton	756	26.7	
Labour	C Mason	712	25.2	
Independent	P Cook	593	21.0	
Turnout		2,829	63.2	

=== Biggleswade Stratton ===
Biggleswade Stratton (3 seats, 4,276 registered voters)
Party	Candidate	Votes	%	±%
Independent	Ms C Cook*	1,182	35.0	−23.7
Conservative	Richard Bennett*	1,112	32.9	−19.5
Labour	Victor Brunt*	1,083	32.1	−11.5
Conservative	David Smith	996	29.5	
Labour	Alistair Costley	780	23.1	−11.0
Labour	T Bornett	759	22.5	−7.4
Turnout		3,378	79.0	

=== Blunham ===
Blunham (1 seat, 1,575 registered voters)
Party	Candidate	Votes	%	±%
Conservative	N Davidson*	556	63.3	+20.9
Alliance	S Lawford	191	21.7	
Labour	Ms S Lamburn	131	14.9	
Turnout		879	55.8	

=== Campton & Meppershall ===
Campton & Meppershall (1 seat, 1,351 registered voters)
Party	Candidate	Votes	%	±%
Conservative	J Buxton*	Unopposed	NA	

=== Clifton & Henlow ===
Clifton & Henlow (3 seats, 3,702 registered voters)
Party	Candidate	Votes	%	±%
Conservative	Geoffrey Rogers*	1,028	68.4	+11.0
Conservative	Patricia Cook	928	61.7	+13.3
Conservative	Ms G Burn	831	55.3	
Labour	Joseph Mayes	475	31.6	
Turnout		1,503	40.6	

=== Clophill ===
Clophill (1 seat, 1,220 registered voters)
Party	Candidate	Votes	%	±%
Conservative	W Russell*	342	67.9	
Labour	Ms P Cue	162	32.1	
Turnout		504	41.3	−42.4

=== Cranfield ===
Cranfield (3 seats, 3,205 registered voters)
Party	Candidate	Votes	%	±%
Conservative	T Grimes	875	45.6	
Conservative	J Hawksby*	770	40.2	−15.2
Conservative	R Palmer*	651	34.0	−14.9
Alliance	F Gurney	511	26.7	
Independent	R Ambridge	270	14.1	
Labour	Alan Morris	261	13.6	
Labour	Ms L Cummins	257	13.4	
Labour	Ms F Perry	221	11.5	
Turnout		1,917	59.8	

=== Flitton, Greenfield & Pulloxhill ===
Flitton, Greenfield & Pulloxhill (1 seat, 1,593 registered voters)
Party	Candidate	Votes	%	±%
Conservative	Ms J Eells*	530	81.8	
Labour	G Renwick	118	18.2	
Turnout		648	40.7	

=== Flitwick East ===
Flitwick East (2 seats, 2,647 registered voters)
Party	Candidate	Votes	%	±%
Conservative	Jack Cowell*	Unopposed	NA	
Conservative	Malcolm Randall*	Unopposed	NA	

=== Flitwick West ===
Flitwick West (2 seats, 3,431 registered voters)
Party	Candidate	Votes	%	±%
Conservative	Dennis Gale*	935	57.9	
Conservative	Cynthia Baker	793	49.1	
Alliance	R Clayton	458	28.3	
Labour	Ms I Austin	224	13.9	
Labour	Peter Churchill	189	11.7	
Turnout		1,616	47.1	−30.3

=== Harlington ===
Harlington (1 seat, 1,807 registered voters)
Party	Candidate	Votes	%	±%
Conservative	A Giles*	674	71.0	+18.7
Labour	T Walsh	274	28.9	
Turnout		949	52.5	−28.1

=== Haynes & Houghton Conquest ===
Haynes & Houghton Conquest (1 seat, 1,771 registered voters)
Party	Candidate	Votes	%	±%
Independent	H Craddock*	519	60.2	
Labour	B Oertel	343	39.8	
Turnout		862	48.7	

=== Langford ===
Langford (1 seat, 1,989 registered voters)
Party	Candidate	Votes	%	±%
Labour	A Loney	Unopposed	NA	

=== Marston ===
Marston (2 seats, 3,296 registered voters)
Party	Candidate	Votes	%	±%
Conservative	Ms C Barnes*	885	63.8	+15.6
Conservative	B Meddings	714	51.4	
Labour	J Thatcher	501	36.1	
Turnout		1,388	42.1	

=== Maulden ===
Maulden (1 seat, 1,920 registered voters)
Party	Candidate	Votes	%	±%
Independent	Ms I Robinson*	478	53.5	−6.7
Conservative	Ms R Frizzells	414	46.4	
Turnout		893	46.5	

=== Northill ===
Northill (1 seat, 1,605 registered voters)
Party	Candidate	Votes	%	±%
Conservative	Patricia Turner*	Unopposed	NA	

=== Old Warden & Southill ===
Old Warden & Southill (1 seat, 1,149 registered voters)
Party	Candidate	Votes	%	±%
Independent	Ms M Hamer-Harries*	Unopposed	NA	

=== Potton ===
Potton (2 seats, 4,191 registered voters)
Party	Candidate	Votes	%	±%
Independent	F Jakes*	835	43.5	
Conservative	J Ream*	690	36.0	
Labour	J Morgan	394	20.5	
Turnout		1,919	45.8	

=== Sandy All Saints ===
Sandy All Saints (2 seats, 2,665 registered voters)
Party	Candidate	Votes	%	±%
Conservative	Alistair Gammell*	783	66.0	+2.6
Conservative	A Sherwood-King*	692	58.3	−2.1
Labour	T Blain	403	34.0	
Turnout		1,186	44.5	

=== Sandy St Swithuns ===
Sandy St Swithuns (3 seats, 3,213 registered voters)
Party	Candidate	Votes	%	±%
Independent	C Osborne	658	42.8	
Conservative	T Sherwood-King	544	35.4	
Labour	Ms C Holloway	333	21.7	
Labour	B Price	321	20.9	
Labour	P Wilks	299	19.5	
Turnout		1,536	47.8	

=== Shefford ===
Shefford (2 seats, 2,514 registered voters)
Party	Candidate	Votes	%	±%
Conservative	Ms E Burson	702	34.4	
Independent	Ms M Faircloth	487	23.9	−5.4
Alliance	A Smyth*	454	22.3	−20.3
Labour	A King	396	19.4	
Labour	G Molan	173	8.5	
Turnout		2,039	81.1	

=== Shillington & Stondon ===
Shillington & Stondon (2 seats, 2,633 registered voters)
Party	Candidate	Votes	%	±%
Independent	R Roe*	624	42.2	−12.1
Conservative	Ms R Simkins	615	41.6	
Independent	S Burr*	554	37.4	−2.3
Labour	M Tenwick	240	16.2	
Labour	B Woolhead	151	10.2	
Turnout		1,480	56.2	

=== Stotfold ===
Stotfold (3 seats, 4,603 registered voters)
Party	Candidate	Votes	%	±%
Independent	F Hyde*	Unopposed	NA	
Labour	H Wood*	Unopposed	NA	
Conservative	J Long*	Unopposed	NA	

=== Wensley ===
Wensley (1 seat, 1,301 registered voters)
Party	Candidate	Votes	%	±%
Conservative	W Goodyer*	Unopposed	NA	

=== Westoning ===
Westoning (1 seat, 1,287 registered voters)
Party	Candidate	Votes	%	±%
Conservative	Jean Kent*	Unopposed	NA	

=== Woburn ===
Woburn (1 seat, 1,290 registered voters)
Party	Candidate	Votes	%	±%
Conservative	D Woodward*	810	78.7	+20.2
Alliance	J Ellis	220	21.4	−18.5
Turnout		1,029	79.8	

=== Wrest ===
Wrest (1 seat, 1,512 registered voters)
Party	Candidate	Votes	%	±%
Conservative	R Thurman	371	46.8	
Alliance	Ms E Storey	220	27.8	
Independent	G Wood*	155	19.6	
Labour	R Martin	47	5.9	
Turnout		792	52.4	
