= 2007 Mid Bedfordshire District Council election =

2007 UK local government election

← 2003	3 May 2007	Central Bedfordshire 2009 →

53 seats for Whole Council 27 seats needed for a majority
- Registered: 98,917
- Turnout: 39%
	First party	Second party	Third party
Party	Conservative	Liberal Democrats	Independent
Seats won	37	11	4
Popular vote	16,712	10,913	3,429
Percentage	47.1%	30.8%	9.7%
	Fourth party	Fifth party	Sixth party
Party	Green	Labour	BNP
Seats won	1	0	0
Popular vote	612	3,591	224
Percentage	1.7%	10.1%	0.6%
- Results by ward

Elections to Mid Bedfordshire District Council were held in May 2007. These were the last elections to the council, with all 53 seats being up for election. Councillors elected would serve a two-year term, expiring in 2009, when Mid Bedfordshire District Council was replaced by Central Bedfordshire Council. The Conservative Party retained overall control of the council, winning 37 of 53 seats on the council. The Conservatives won 8 seats (5 wards) unopposed, as did an Independent candidate in one ward.

== Result summary ==
Mid Bedfordshire District Council Election Result 2007
Party	Seats	Gains	Losses	Net gain/loss	Seats %	Votes %	Votes	+/−
Conservative	37	6	3	+3	69.81	47.1	16,712	+5.2
Liberal Democrats	11	1	4	-3	20.75	30.8	10,913	+6.2
Independent	4	1	1	0	7.55	9.7	3,429	+1.6
Green	1	1	0	1	1.89	1.7	612	-1.7
Labour	0	0	1	-1	0.00	10.1	3,591	-11.9
BNP	0	0	0	0	0.00	0.6	224	+0.6

== Ward results ==
All results are listed below:

Figures on turnout were taken from Plymouth University's Elections Centre, which gives the number of registered voters, and the percentage turnout for each ward. The number of ballots cast for each ward was calculated from these. Percentage change in turnout is compared with the same ward in the 2003 District Council election.

The percentage of the vote for each candidate was calculated compared with the number of ballots cast in the ward. Note that in a ward with more than one seat, voters were allowed to place as many crosses on the ballot paper as seats. The percentage change for each candidate is compared with the same candidate in the 2003 District Council election.

Candidates who were members of the council before the election are marked with an asterisk.

Asterisks denote incumbent councillors seeking re-election.

=== Ampthill ===
One Independent gain from Conservatives.

Ampthill (3 seats, 5,390 registered voters)
Party	Candidate	Votes	%	±%
Liberal Democrats	Gary Summerfield*	1,381	55.2	−4.0
Liberal Democrats	Michael Pearce	1,077	43.1	
Independent	Mark Smith	1,060	42.4	+7.0
Conservative	Paul Duckett	1,035	41.4	
Conservative	Richard Holden*	974	38.9	−2.4
Conservative	Carol Gibson	939	37.5	
Turnout		2,501	46.4	+9.1

=== Arlesey ===
One Conservative gain from Independent; one Conservative gain from Labour.

Arlesey (2 seats, 4,107 registered voters)
Party	Candidate	Votes	%	±%
Conservative	Hugh Harper	562	44.0	
Conservative	Ian Dalgarno	491	38.4	
Labour	Dorothy Brown*	442	34.6	−16.0
Independent	Victor Williams*	427	33.4	−28.9
Labour	Lorraine Warwick	275	21.5	
Independent	David West	202	15.8	+2.8
Turnout		1,277	31.1	+5.7

=== Aspley Guise ===
Aspley Guise (1 seat, 1,913 registered voters)
Party	Candidate	Votes	%	±%
Conservative	Fiona Chapman* (Note: Mrs Chapman's full name is Catherine Fiona Chapman MBE. Since 2009 she has been councillor for Flitwick on Central Bedfordshire Council, and is listed on Central Bedfordshire Council's website as Cllr Mrs C Fiona Chapman MBE. She is sometimes listed as Catherine Chapman, and sometimes as Fiona Chapman. She was first elected to Mid Bedfordshire District Council in 1976.)	Unopposed	NA	

=== Biggleswade Holme ===
Biggleswade Holme (2 seats, 3,666 registered voters)
Party	Candidate	Votes	%	±%
Conservative	Peter Vickers*	806	60.6	+19.7
Conservative	David Smith*	795	59.7	+17.0
Labour	Sheila Grayston	471	35.4	
Labour	Dennis James	395	29.7	
Turnout		1,331	36.3	+0.8

=== Biggleswade Ivel ===
Biggleswade Ivel (3 seats, 5,716 registered voters)
Party	Candidate	Votes	%	±%
Conservative	Wendy Smith*	1,015	54.0	
Conservative	Jane Lawrence*	980	52.1	+11.3
Conservative	Maurice Jones*	914	48.6	+5.7
Labour	Rex Skinner	697	37.1	+1.5
Labour	Bernard Briars	680	36.2	−3.3
Labour	David Albone	678	36.0	
Turnout		1,881	32.9	+5.5

=== Biggleswade Stratton ===
Biggleswade Stratton (2 seats, 2,741 registered voters)
Party	Candidate	Votes	%	±%
Conservative	David Lawrence*	509	48.8	+2.0
Conservative	Michael Cazaly*	497	47.6	+1.4
Labour	Amy Forbes	322	30.8	
Labour	Rebecca Kerfoot	292	28.0	−9.2
BNP	Philippa Carter	224	21.5	
Turnout		1,044	38.1	+11.8

=== Clifton and Meppershall ===
Clifton and Meppershall (2 seats, 3,605 registered voters)
Party	Candidate	Votes	%	±%
Conservative	Anthony Rogers*	1,143	71.1	+14.7
Conservative	Paul Carne*	1,112	69.2	+16.4
Labour	David Devereux	357	22.2	+1.2
Turnout		1,608	44.6	+4.9

=== Cranfield ===
Cranfield (2 seats, 4,241 registered voters)
Party	Candidate	Votes	%	±%
Conservative	Alan Bastable*	873	62.9	+2.8
Conservative	Kenneth Matthews*	867	62.5	−0.4
Labour	Alan Morris	429	30.9	−0.5
Labour	Laurence Pollock	411	29.6	+0.5
Turnout		1,387	32.7	+4.0

=== Flitton, Greenfield and Pulloxhill ===
One Green gain from Conservatives.

Flitton, Greenfield and Pulloxhill (1 seat, 1,762 registered voters)
Party	Candidate	Votes	%	±%
Green	Richard Ellis	612	64.4	+18.8
Conservative	David Thompson*	334	35.1	−19.4
Turnout		951	54.0	+17.1

=== Flitwick East ===
Flitwick East (2 seats, 4,425 registered voters)
Party	Candidate	Votes	%	±%
Liberal Democrats	Stephen Mitchell*	883	56.1	
Liberal Democrats	John Watton*	766	48.6	+11.4
Conservative	Victor Lee	633	40.2	
Conservative	Sohail Aslam	478	30.3	
Turnout		1,575	35.6	+7.0

=== Flitwick West ===
Flitwick West (3 seats, 5,795 registered voters)
Party	Candidate	Votes	%	±%
Conservative	Stephen Male*	1,283	65.9	+10.1
Conservative	Dennis Gale*	1,191	61.2	+0.2
Conservative	David Bayntun	1,067	54.8	
Liberal Democrats	Isobel Mason	715	36.7	
Turnout		1,947	33.6	+5.0

=== Harlington ===
Harlington (1 seat, 1,796 registered voters)
Party	Candidate	Votes	%	±%
Liberal Democrats	Brian Golby*	739	72.2	−14.4
Conservative	Margaret Moriondo	216	21.1	
Labour	Margaret Brown	66	6.4	
Turnout		1,024	57.0	+8.8

=== Houghton, Haynes, Southill and Old Warden ===
One Conservative gain from Liberal-Democrats.

Houghton, Haynes, Southill and Old Warden (2 seats, 3,191 registered voters)
Party	Candidate	Votes	%	±%
Liberal Democrats	Anthony Baines	777	53.2	+29.1
Conservative	Angela Barker	670	45.9	
Liberal Democrats	John Goode	613	42.0	
Conservative	Alan Carter	569	38.9	
Turnout		1,461	45.8	

=== Langford and Henlow Village ===
Two Conservative gains from Liberal-Democrats.

Langford and Henlow Village (2 seats, 0 registered voters)
Party	Candidate	Votes	%	±%
Conservative	Jonathan Clarke	966	66.1	
Conservative	Zain Haider	862	47.5	
Liberal Democrats	William Cliff*	822	45.3	−0.9
Liberal Democrats	Francis Hendrix	744	41.0	
Turnout		0	0.0	+3.0

=== Marston ===
Marston (2 seats, 4,259 registered voters)
Party	Candidate	Votes	%	±%
Conservative	Darren Tysoe*	846	59.5	−4.4
Conservative	Michael Gibson	598	42.0	
Liberal Democrats	Ian Booth	482	33.9	
Independent	Iain Clapham	454	31.9	
Turnout		1,423	33.4	+7.0

=== Maulden and Clophill ===
Maulden and Clophill (2 seats, 3,694 registered voters)
Party	Candidate	Votes	%	±%
Conservative	Martin Hawkins*	Unopposed	NA	
Conservative	Howard Lockey*	Unopposed	NA	

=== Northill and Blunham ===
Northill and Blunham (2 seats, 3,525 registered voters)
Party	Candidate	Votes	%	±%
Conservative	Joanna Davison*	1,102	70.4	
Conservative	Patricia Turner*	1,034	66.1	
Liberal Democrats	Gail Davis	440	28.1	
Turnout		1,565	44.4	

=== Potton and Wensley ===
Potton and Wensley (3 seats, 5,698 registered voters)
Party	Candidate	Votes	%	±%
Conservative	Doreen Gurney*	Unopposed	NA	
Conservative	Anita Lewis*	Unopposed	NA	
Conservative	John Lewis*	Unopposed	NA	

=== Sandy Ivel ===
Sandy Ivel (2 seats, 3,425 registered voters)
Party	Candidate	Votes	%	±%
Liberal Democrats	Peter Blaine*	773	55.2	−6.1
Independent	John Gurney*	727	51.9	−12.9
Conservative	Robert Smith	537	38.3	+15.5
Conservative	Douglas McIlwain	484	34.5	
Turnout		1,401	40.9	+10.3

=== Sandy Pinnacle ===
Sandy Pinnacle (3 seats, 5,182 registered voters)
Party	Candidate	Votes	%	±%
Liberal Democrats	Peter Aldis*	1,016	54.2	+9.4
Liberal Democrats	Mark Butler	900	48.0	
Independent	Kenneth Lynch	761	40.6	
Liberal Democrats	Geoffrey White	737	39.3	
Conservative	Rachel Smith	658	35.1	
Turnout		1,876	36.2	+7.2

=== Shefford, Campton and Gravenhurst ===
Shefford, Campton and Gravenhurst (3 seats, 5,546 registered voters)
Party	Candidate	Votes	%	±%
Conservative	Lewis Birt*	1,237	57.8	+8.0
Conservative	Anthony Brown*	1,117	52.2	+4.5
Liberal Democrats	Mark Chapman*	1,016	47.5	+5.9
Conservative	Richard Stidolph	939	43.9	
Labour	Carolyn Devereux	424	19.8	−11.5
Turnout		2,141	38.6	+7.3

=== Shillington, Stondon and Henlow Camp ===
One Liberal-Democrat gain from Conservatives.

Shillington, Stondon and Henlow Camp (2 seats, 4,391 registered voters)
Party	Candidate	Votes	%	±%
Conservative	Rita Drinkwater*	1,018	60.5	−9.9
Liberal Democrats	Alison Graham	886	52.7	
Conservative	Anthony Whiteman*	649	38.6	−19.3
Turnout		1,682	38.3	+5.8

=== Silsoe ===
Silsoe (1 seat, 1,379 registered voters)
Party	Candidate	Votes	%	±%
Conservative	Kathleen Keen*	Unopposed	NA	

=== Stotfold ===
One Conservative gain from Liberal-Democrats.

Stotfold (3 seats, 5,730 registered voters)
Party	Candidate	Votes	%	±%
Conservative	John Street*	1,268	61.1	+2.9
Conservative	Christina Turner	1,158	55.8	
Conservative	John Saunders*	1,012	48.8	+0.0
Liberal Democrats	Brian Collier*	983	47.4	−10.7
Labour	Allister Dennis	383	18.5	
Turnout		2,074	36.2	+2.5

=== Westoning and Tingrith ===
Westoning and Tingrith (1 seat, 1,720 registered voters)
Party	Candidate	Votes	%	±%
Independent	Andrew Rayment* (Note: Andrew Rayment stood successfully for the Conservatives in this ward in the 1995 and 1999 elections, and was one of the nominators of the Conservative candidate for Mid Bedfordshire in the 2017 general election.)	Unopposed	NA	

=== Woburn ===
Woburn (1 seat, 2,035 registered voters)
Party	Candidate	Votes	%	±%
Conservative	Budge Wells	Unopposed	NA	
