= 1973 Mid Bedfordshire District Council election =

1973 UK local government election

7 June 1973	1976 →

All 49 seats to whole Council 25 seats needed for a majority
- Registered: 62,423
- Turnout: 49%
	First party	Second party	Third party
Party	Independent	Conservative	Labour
Seats won	21	17	9
Popular vote	12,232	6,729	7,882
Percentage	43.0%	23.6%	27.7%
	Fourth party
Party	Liberal
Seats won	2
Popular vote	1,626
Percentage	5.7%
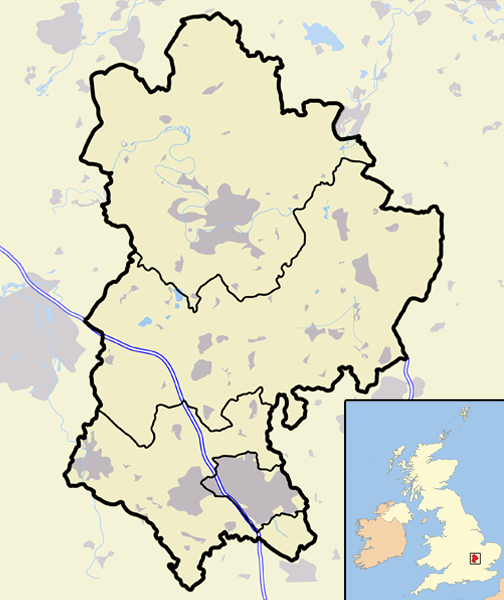
- Locations of wards in Mid Bedfordshire

The first election to Mid Bedfordshire District Council was held on 7 June 1973, with the 49 councillors elected forming a shadow authority until 1 April 1974. Mid Bedfordshire District was formed on 1 April 1974 as part of a general reorganisation of local authorities in England and Wales carried out under the Local Government Act 1972. The district was formed by the amalgamation of five districts:

- Ampthill Urban District
- Biggleswade Urban District
- Sandy Urban District
- Ampthill Rural District
- Biggleswade Rural District

In 1973 Mid Bedfordshire had 62,423 registered electors, of which 57,527 were in the 23 contested wards. The turnout in the contested wards was 49%. Two wards (Henlow & Langford and Wrest) were uncontested.

== Result ==
Mid Bedfordshire District Council Election Result 1973
Party	Seats	Gains	Losses	Net gain/loss	Seats %	Votes %	Votes	+/−
Independent	21				42.9	43.0	12,232	
Conservative	17				34.7	23.6	6,729	
Labour	9				18.4	27.7	7,882	
Liberal	2				4.1	5.7	1,626	

== Ward results ==
All results are listed below:

Figures on turnout were taken from Plymouth University's Elections Centre, which gives the number of registered voters, and the percentage turnout for each ward. The number of ballots cast for each ward was calculated from these.

The percentage of the vote for each candidate was calculated compared with the number of ballots cast in the ward. Note that in a ward with more than one seat, voters were allowed to place as many crosses on the ballot paper as seats.

=== Ampthill ===
Ampthill (3 seats, 4,110 registered voters)
Party	Candidate	Votes	%	±%
Independent	J Nottingham	1,036	33.5	
Labour	Ms G Wagstaff	722	23.3	
Liberal	P Cruse	675	21.8	
Conservative	L Sturman	664	21.4	
Conservative	Ms A Palmer	645	20.8	
Labour	R Holmes	488	15.8	
Labour	G Lane	451	14.6	
Liberal	Ms M Laycock	298	9.6	
Liberal	F Rudd	281	9.1	
Turnout		3,097	75.4	

=== Arlesey ===
Arlesey (2 seats, 2,575 registered voters)
Party	Candidate	Votes	%	±%
Conservative	Ms A Albon	480	50.8	
Labour	June Harrowell	464	49.2	
Conservative	R Turner	407	43.1	
Labour	C Bromley	399	42.3	
Turnout		944	36.7	

=== Aspley (No 13) ===
Aspley (No 13) (2 seats, 1,967 registered voters)
Party	Candidate	Votes	%	±%
Independent	M Kemp	580	67.1	
Independent	W Klinner	468	54.1	
Liberal	Ms S Kilpin	285	32.9	
Turnout		865	44.0	

=== Biggleswade (No 2) ===
Biggleswade (No 2) (6 seats, 7,127 registered voters)
Party	Candidate	Votes	%	±%
Labour	L Chambers	1,875	38.7	
Independent	Ms C Cook	1,752	36.1	
Labour	Victor Brunt	1,713	35.3	
Labour	R Pepper	1,418	29.3	
Conservative	Patricia Rouse	1,221	25.2	
Independent	Ms M Armstrong	1,195	24.7	
Labour	A Haynes	1,179	24.3	
Independent	J Bones	1,092	22.5	
Independent	Ms C Ballantyne-Evans	761	15.7	
Turnout		4,847	68.0	

=== Blunham (No 17) ===
Blunham (No 17) (1 seat, 1,273 registered voters)
Party	Candidate	Votes	%	±%
Independent	Ms E Woods	272	43.8	
Liberal	R Sawford	222	35.7	
Labour	C Wale	127	20.5	
Turnout		621	48.8	

=== Campton & Meppershall & Shefford (No 20) ===
Campton & Meppershall & Shefford (No 20) (4 seats, 4,964 registered voters)
Party	Candidate	Votes	%	±%
Conservative	Ms A Gouldsborough	1,222	38.0	
Conservative	Geoffrey Rogers	1,213	37.8	
Conservative	F Burrows	1,183	36.8	
Labour	A Smythe	998	31.1	
Independent	F Pettifer	994	30.9	
Independent	Ms M Faircloth	759	23.6	
Labour	W Barnett	700	21.8	
Labour	T Beggs	612	19.1	
Turnout		3,212	64.7	

=== Clophill ===
Clophill (1 seat, 1,080 registered voters)
Party	Candidate	Votes	%	±%
Conservative	W Russell	294	59.4	
Labour	R Bailey	201	40.6	
Turnout		495	45.8	

=== Cranfield ===
Cranfield (2 seats, 2,938 registered voters)
Party	Candidate	Votes	%	±%
Independent	J Salisbury	745	66.5	
Independent	A Wheelan	553	49.4	
Labour	H Iron	375	33.5	
Labour	F Keep	329	29.4	
Turnout		1,120	38.1	

=== Flitton & Pulloxhill & Westoning (No 10) ===
Flitton & Pulloxhill & Westoning (No 10) (2 seats, 2,020 registered voters)
Party	Candidate	Votes	%	±%
Conservative	Jean Kent	297	51.8	
Conservative	Ms J Eells	280	48.9	
Independent	A Kitchiner	276	48.2	
Independent	Ms M Frankish	228	39.8	
Independent	F Sheridan	123	21.5	
Turnout		573	28.4	

=== Flitwick & Steppingly (No 11) ===
Flitwick & Steppingly (No 11) (3 seats, 3,839 registered voters)
Party	Candidate	Votes	%	±%
Conservative	Malcolm Randall	599	39.9	
Conservative	J Pack	486	32.4	
Labour	Ms F Rolls	466	31.1	
Independent	W Billington	435	29.0	
Labour	Ms S Harris	408	27.2	
Labour	M Dillon	385	25.7	
Independent	H Farmer	250	16.7	
Independent	I Walker	164	10.9	
Turnout		1,500	39.1	

=== Harlington ===
Harlington (1 seat, 1,334 registered voters)
Party	Candidate	Votes	%	±%
Conservative	A Giles	255	34.0	
Labour	D Parker	243	32.4	
Independent	E Preston	159	21.2	
Independent	T Mead	94	12.5	
Turnout		751	56.3	

=== Haynes & Houghton Conquest ===
Haynes & Houghton Conquest (1 seat, 1,542 registered voters)
Party	Candidate	Votes	%	±%
Independent	D Lawson	437	60.2	
Independent	H Craddock	289	39.8	
Turnout		726	47.1	

=== Henlow & Langford (No 21) ===
Henlow & Langford (No 21) (3 seats, 3,538 registered voters)
Party	Candidate	Votes	%	±%
Independent	G Charles	Unopposed	NA	
Conservative	G Gates	Unopposed	NA	
Liberal	J Sewell	Unopposed	NA	

=== Lidlington (No 15) ===
Lidlington (No 15) (1 seat, 1,521 registered voters)
Party	Candidate	Votes	%	±%
Labour	A Donnely	215	35.3	
Liberal	Ms J Downes	157	25.8	
Independent	Ms T Parrish	137	22.5	
Independent	F Scott	100	16.4	
Turnout		609	40.0	

=== Marston (No 14) ===
Marston (No 14) (1 seat, 1,544 registered voters)
Party	Candidate	Votes	%	±%
Independent	J Bushby	528	61.1	
Labour	D Towell	337	39.0	
Turnout		864	56.0	

=== Maulden ===
Maulden (1 seat, 1,452 registered voters)
Party	Candidate	Votes	%	±%
Independent	Ms I Robinson	388	50.3	
Independent	A Woodward	274	35.5	
Labour	F Harris	109	14.1	
Turnout		771	53.1	

=== Northill (No 18) ===
Northill (No 18) (1 seat, 1,822 registered voters)
Party	Candidate	Votes	%	±%
Independent	Ms S Dingley	378	43.1	
Liberal	Alistair Costley	328	37.4	
Labour	R Charlick	172	19.6	
Turnout		878	48.2	

=== Old Warden & Southill ===
Old Warden & Southill (1 seat, 1,211 registered voters)
Party	Candidate	Votes	%	±%
Conservative	J Saunderson	244	52.5	
Independent	R Allingham	221	47.5	
Turnout		465	38.4	

=== Potton (No 24) ===
Potton (No 24) (2 seats, 2,515 registered voters)
Party	Candidate	Votes	%	±%
Independent	F Jakes	344	54.2	
Conservative	J Ream	291	45.8	
Independent	E Mayston	193	30.4	
Independent	A Dennis	144	22.7	
Turnout		635	25.2	

=== Sandy (No 3) ===
Sandy (No 3) (3 seats, 4,122 registered voters)
Party	Candidate	Votes	%	±%
Independent	K Quince	852	43.1	
Conservative	A Sherwood-King	731	37.0	
Conservative	J Harrison	711	36.0	
Independent	E Smith	670	33.9	
Conservative	L Dray	638	32.3	
Labour	Ms J Monahan	393	19.9	
Turnout		1,975	47.9	

=== Shillington & Stondon ===
Shillington & Stondon (2 seats, 2,461 registered voters)
Party	Candidate	Votes	%	±%
Independent	R Roe	433	69.7	
Independent	G Cooper	391	63.0	
Independent	J Burgess	230	37.0	
Labour	D Cripps	188	30.3	
Turnout		621	25.2	

=== Stotfold ===
Stotfold (3 seats, 3,994 registered voters)
Party	Candidate	Votes	%	±%
Labour	H Wood	746	54.0	
Independent	F Hyde	635	46.0	
Independent	B Clark	571	41.3	
Independent	A Brown	503	36.4	
Labour	C Dunkley	427	30.9	
Labour	W McColl	363	26.3	
Turnout		1,381	34.6	

=== Wensley (No 25) ===
Wensley (No 25) (1 seat, 884 registered voters)
Party	Candidate	Votes	%	±%
Conservative	W Goodyer	233	52.6	
Independent	D Walker	210	47.4	
Turnout		443	50.1	

=== Woburn ===
Woburn (1 seat, 1,232 registered voters)
Party	Candidate	Votes	%	±%
Independent	Ms G Glasse	376	65.5	
Conservative	D Woodward	198	34.5	
Turnout		574	46.6	

=== Wrest ===
Wrest (1 seat, 1,358 registered voters)
Party	Candidate	Votes	%	±%
Independent	G Wood	Unopposed	NA	
