= Mid Bedfordshire District =

Local government district in England

Coordinates: 52°08′09″N 0°28′05″W

Mid Bedfordshire
- Shown within Bedfordshire
- Area
  - 1974: 124,423 acres (503.52 km^{2})
- Population
  - 1973: 94,750
  - 1992: 110,110
  - 2007: 118,200
- History
  - Created: 1974
  - Abolished: 2009
  - Succeeded by: Central Bedfordshire
- Status: Former district
- ONS code: 09UC
- Government: Mid Bedfordshire District Council
- Subdivisions
  - Type: Civil parishes

Mid Bedfordshire was a local government district in Bedfordshire, England, from 1974 to 2009.

== Creation ==
The district was formed on 1 April 1974 as part of a general reorganisation of local authorities in England and Wales carried out under the Local Government Act 1972. Mid Bedfordshire was formed by the amalgamation of five districts:

- Ampthill Urban District
- Biggleswade Urban District
- Sandy Urban District
- Ampthill Rural District
- Biggleswade Rural District

The new council continued to use the former offices of Ampthill Rural District Council and Biggleswade Rural District Council until 2006, when a new combined office was built at Priory House, Chicksands for £15 million.

== Civil parishes ==
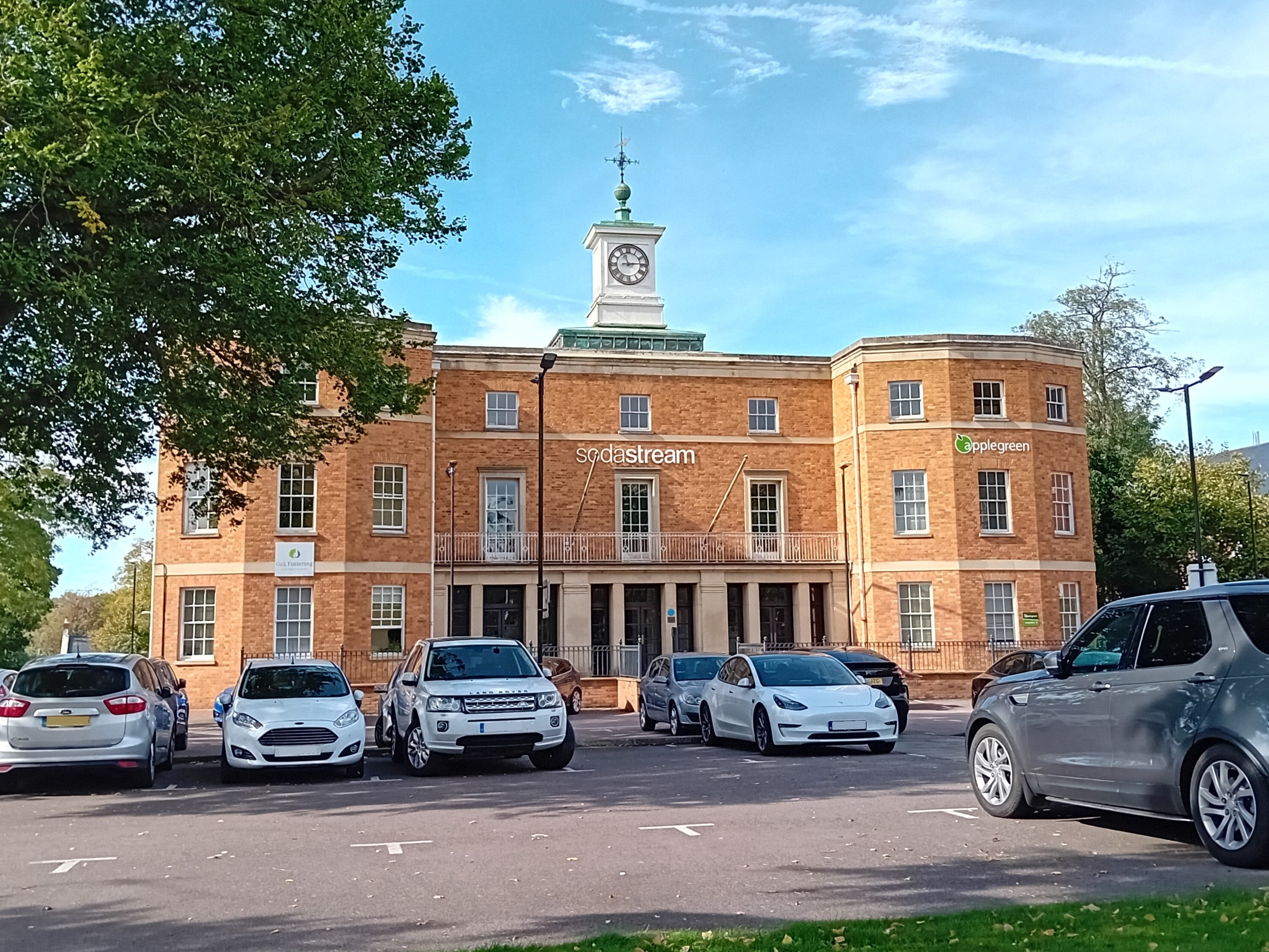
Former offices of Mid Bedfordshire District Council at 12 Dunstable Street, Ampthill

The district comprised the following civil parishes:

- Ampthill
- Aspley Heath
- Arlesey
- Astwick
- Aspley Guise
- Battlesden
- Biggleswade (Town)
- Blunham
- Brogborough
- Campton and Chicksands
- Clifton
- Clophill
- Cranfield
- Dunton
- Edworth
- Eversholt
- Everton
- Eyeworth
- Flitton and Greenfield
- Flitwick
- Gravenhurst
- Harlington
- Haynes
- Henlow
- Henlow Camp
- Houghton Conquest
- Hulcote and Salford
- Husborne Crawley
- Langford
- Lidlington
- Marston Moretaine
- Maulden
- Milton Bryan
- Meppershall
- Moggerhanger
- Millbrook
- Northill
- Old Warden
- Potsgrove
- Potton
- Pulloxhill
- Ridgmont
- Sandy (Town)
- Shefford (Town)
- Shillington
- Silsoe
- Southill
- Stondon
- Stotfold
- Sutton
- Tempsford
- Tingrith
- Westoning
- Woburn
- Wrestlingworth and Cockayne Hatley

== Elections and political control ==
The first election to Mid Bedfordshire District Council took place on 7 June 1973, with the 49 councillors elected forming a shadow authority until 1 April 1974. Following ward boundary changes, the number of councillors was increased to 53 in 1979. Elections for the whole council were then held in 1979 and every four years thereafter. In 2003 the wards were again redrawn, with the size of the council remaining at 53. The final election took place in 2007, with councillors staying in office until the abolition of the council in 2009.

The first council elected had a large majority of independent councillors. Gains by the Conservatives in 1976 meant that the council was under no control, although independents remained the largest group. In 1979 Conservatives gained a majority, which they held for sixteen years. In 1995 there was a large swing against the unpopular government of John Major, and the Labour Party gained 17 seats to achieve parity with the Conservatives. The council also included Liberal Democrats and Independents. In 1999 the Conservatives regained control, which they held until the council's abolition.

Year	Conservative	Labour	Liberal/ Liberal Democrat	Independent	Green Party	Control
1973	17	13	8	7	0	Independent
1976	19	3	1	26	0	No overall control
1979 †	36	10	6	3	0	Conservative gain from NOC
1983	26	7	0	20	0	Conservative hold
1987	42	2	3	6	0	Conservative hold
1991	40	3	3	7	0	Conservative hold
1995	21	21	5	6	0	No overall control
1999	34	7	6	6	0	Conservative gain from NOC
2003 †	38	1	9	5	0	Conservative hold
2007	38	0	11	3	1	Conservative hold

† New ward boundaries

== Abolition ==
In 2006 the Department for Communities and Local Government considered reorganising Bedfordshire's administrative structure as part of the 2009 structural changes to local government in England. On 6 March 2008 it was announced that Mid Bedfordshire would merge with the neighbouring district of South Bedfordshire to form a new unitary authority called Central Bedfordshire. The new council was formed on 1 April 2009 although its initial members were not elected until 4 June 2009.
