= Central Bedfordshire Council =

Local authority in England

Type
- Type: Unitary authority

History
- Founded: 1 April 2009
- Preceded by: Bedfordshire County Council District councils: Mid Bedfordshire District Council; South Bedfordshire District Council

Leadership
- Chair: Kevin Collins, Conservative since 15 May 2025
- Leader: Adam Zerny, Independent since 25 May 2023
- Chief Executive: Marcel Coiffait since November 2020

Structure
- Seats: 63 councillors
- Political groups: Administration (15) Independent (15) (Note: Independent Alliance (15)) Other parties (48) Conservative Party (20) Liberal Democrats (8) Labour Party (4) Green (1) Reform UK (2) Independent (12) (Note: Central Bedfordshire Community Network (group also includes the Green councillor))
- Joint committees: East of England Local Government Association

Elections
- Last election: 4 May 2023
- Next election: 6 May 2027

Meeting place
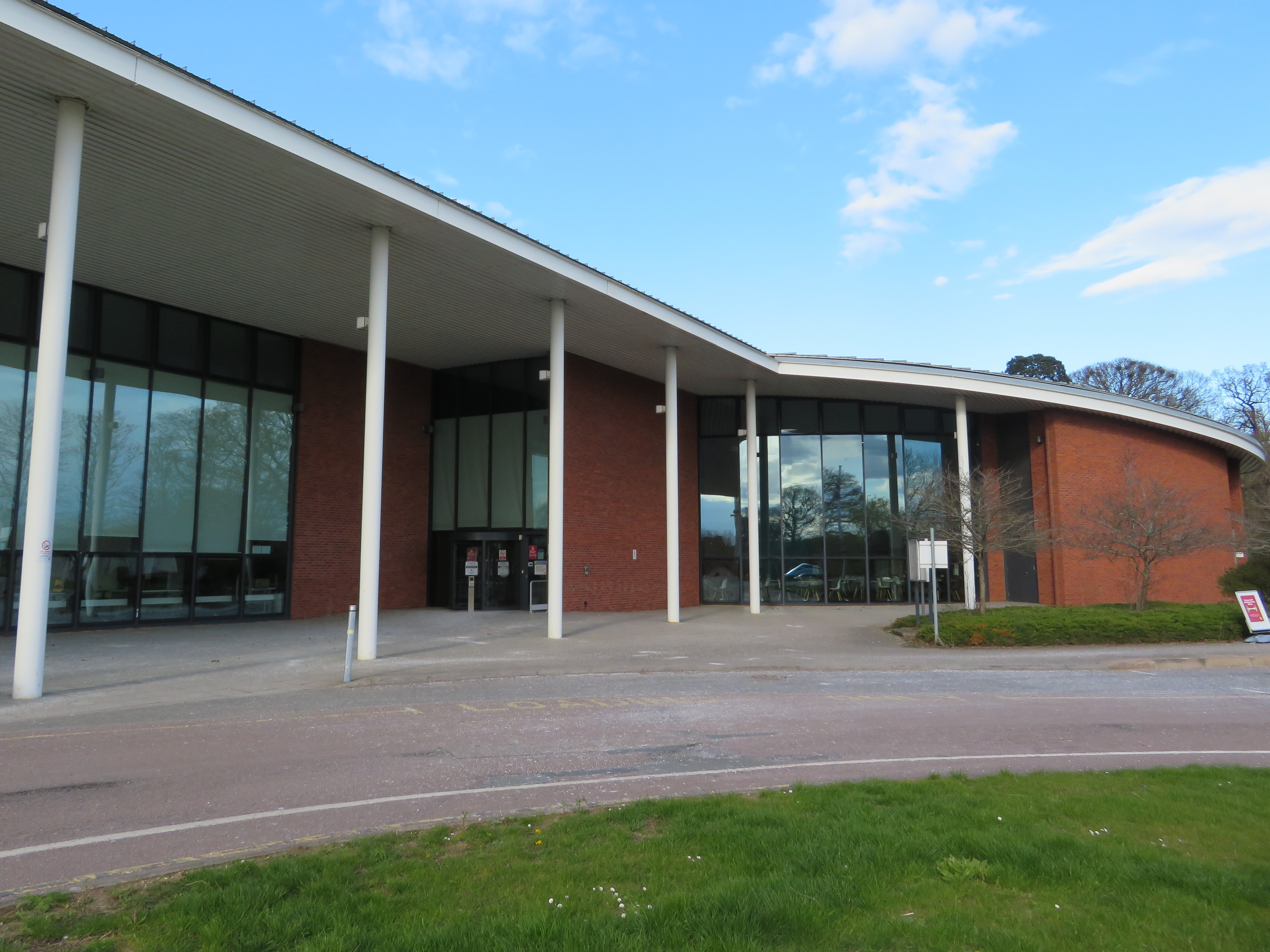
- Priory House, Monks Walk, Chicksands, Shefford, SG17 5TQ

Website
- www.centralbedfordshire.gov.uk

Central Bedfordshire Council is the local authority for Central Bedfordshire, a local government district in the ceremonial county of Bedfordshire, England. The council is a unitary authority, being a district council which also performs the functions of a county council. It has been under no overall control since 2023, being run by an independent-led administration. The council is based at Chicksands.

== History ==
Local government in Bedfordshire was reorganised with effect from 1 April 2009. The borough of Luton had already been made a unitary authority independent from the county council in 1997. The changes in 2009 divided the rest of the county into two unitary authorities: Bedford and Central Bedfordshire. The new Central Bedfordshire covered the combined area of the two former districts of Mid Bedfordshire and South Bedfordshire. Central Bedfordshire Council also took over the functions of the abolished Bedfordshire County Council within the area. Central Bedfordshire is legally both a non-metropolitan district and a non-metropolitan county, but there is no separate county council; instead the district council performs both district and county functions, making it a unitary authority. Central Bedfordshire remains part of the ceremonial county of Bedfordshire for the purposes of lieutenancy.

== Political control ==
The council went under no overall control at the 2023 election, having previously had a Conservative majority. An independent-led administration - the first in a unitary authority in English local government history - subsequently formed, with independent councillor Adam Zerny being appointed leader of the council. The group of independent councillors split in July 2024 into the 'Independent Alliance' group and the 'Independent Network' group (later renamed the 'Central Bedfordshire Community Network').

Political control of the council since its creation in 2009 has been as follows:

Party in control	Years
Conservative	2009–2023
No overall control	2023–present

=== Leadership ===
The first leader of the council was Tricia Turner, who had been the last leader of Mid Bedfordshire District Council. The leaders of the council since 2009 have been:

Councillor	Party	From	To
Tricia Turner	Conservative	18 Jun 2009	May 2011
James Jamieson	Conservative	19 May 2011	Jan 2021
Richard Wenham	Conservative	14 Jan 2021	May 2023
Adam Zerny	Independent	25 May 2023	

=== Composition ===
The composition of the council at May 2026 was:

Party	Councillors
Independent	28
Conservative	20
Liberal Democrats	8
Labour	4
Reform	2
Green	1
Total:	63

Fifteen of the independent councillors sit together as the 'Independent Alliance', twelve sit together with the Green councillor as the 'Central Bedfordshire Community Network', and the other independent is not aligned to a group. The next election is due in 2027.

== Premises ==
The council inherited offices at Priory House (built 2006) in Chicksands, just outside the town of Shefford, from Mid Bedfordshire District Council, and the South Bedfordshire District Council offices (built 1989) in Dunstable. Priory House became the new council's headquarters. The South Bedfordshire offices were renamed Watling House and served as additional offices for the council until being closed in 2022.

== Elections ==
Since the last boundary changes in 2023, the council comprises 63 councillors, elected from 31 wards. Elections are held every four years.
