= Stanford, Bedfordshire =

Hamlet in Bedfordshire, England

Coordinates: 52.05492°N 0.30359°W

Stanford
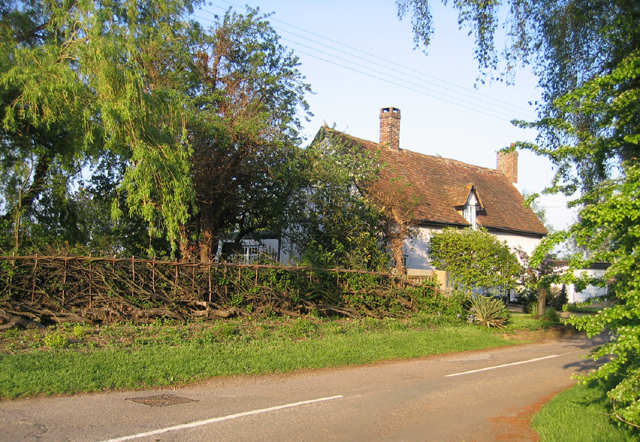
- Mill Road

- Location within Bedfordshire
- OS grid reference: TL163014
- Civil parish: Southill
- Unitary authority: Central Bedfordshire
- Ceremonial county: Bedfordshire
- Region: East
- Country: England
- Sovereign state: United Kingdom
- Post town: Biggleswade
- Postcode district: SG18
- Dialling code: 01462
- Police: Bedfordshire
- Fire: Bedfordshire
- Ambulance: East of England
- UK Parliament: North Bedfordshire

Stanford is a hamlet in the civil parish of Southill, in the Central Bedfordshire district, in the ceremonial county of Bedfordshire, England. It is about 8.5 miles (14 km) south-east of the county town of Bedford.

== Geography ==
Stanford lies 2 miles (3 km) north-east of Shefford, 3 miles (5 km) south-west of Biggleswade and 20 miles (32 km) south-west of Cambridge.

Landscape

The village lies within the Bedfordshire and Cambridgeshire Claylands (NCA 88) as designated by Natural England. Central Bedfordshire Council has locally classified the landscape as Upper Ivel Clay Valley. Flat, open arable fields predominate.

Elevation

The village is 43 metres (141 ft) above sea level.

Geology, soil type and land use

The village is surrounded by arable farmland and lies on glacial gravel (till) over Lower Greensand. The soil is highly fertile, freely draining and slightly acid but base-rich.

Stanford Wood, a pine wood with a small lake is to the east of the hamlet between Stanford Road and the B658. A gravel pit is shown here on the Ordnance Survey map of 1900.

A playing field in the middle of the village includes a playground area, basketball court and football pitch. Broom South sand and gravel quarry lies to the north-east.

The night sky and light pollution

Light pollution is the level of radiance (night lights) shining up into the night sky. The Campaign to Protect Rural England (CPRE) divides the level of night sky brightness into 9 bands with band 1 being the darkest i.e. with the lowest level of light pollution and band 9 the brightest and most polluted. Stanford has an index of 0.5–1 nanoWatts (nW) which places it in band 3. However, the night sky brightens towards Langford, Clifton and Shefford.

== History ==
Stanford means "stone ford". The Domesday Book records eight land holdings in Stanford in 1086 and lists thirteen villagers, three smallholders and four slaves.

In 1870–72 Stanford had a population of 385.

A water mill at the end of Mill Road was fed by a mill race from the Ivel Navigation but by 1916 it was no longer in operation.

Stanford at one time had three public houses. Only the Green Man remains.

== Education ==
A small school was opened in 1899 but a falling role led to its closure in 1921 and pupils transferred to Broom. The building on the junction of Old School Lane and the B658 road is now a residential dwelling .

It is in the catchment zone for Robert Bloomfield Academy. Stanford is also in the catchment zone for Samuel Whitbread Academy, which has an upper school and sixth form.

== Governance ==
Stanford elects three councillors to Southill parish council. It is part of Northill ward for elections to the Central Bedfordshire Unitary Authority.

Prior to 1894, Stanford was administered as part of the hundred of Wixamtree. From 1894 until 1974 it was in Biggleswade Rural District and from 1974 to 2009 in Mid Bedfordshire District.

Since 2024, Stanford has been in the North Bedfordshire parliamentary constituency.

== Public transport ==
Grant Palmer operates route 200 a two-hourly Monday to Saturday daytime bus service to Biggleswade (journey time 9 to 15 minutes) and to Clifton, Shefford and Flitwick (50 minutes). There is a weekly, Wednesday only service to Bedford by community bus operator, Wanderbus (journey time 26 minutes). Wanderbus also runs monthly services to St Neots and Welwyn Garden City.

The nearest railway station is Biggleswade.
