= Holme, Bedfordshire =

Hamlet in Bedfordshire, England

Coordinates: 52°04′12″N 0°15′43″W

Holme
- Hamlet
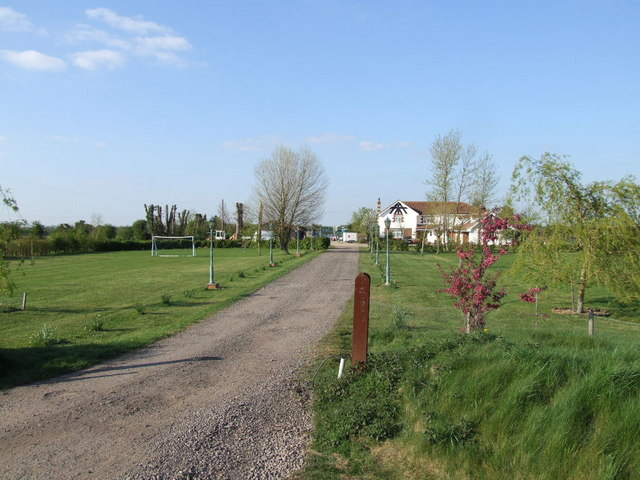
- Holme near Biggleswade

- Location within Bedfordshire
- OS grid reference: TL192427
- Civil parish: Biggleswade
- Unitary authority: Central Bedfordshire
- Ceremonial county: Bedfordshire
- Region: East
- Country: England
- Sovereign state: United Kingdom
- Post town: BIGGLESWADE
- Postcode district: SG18
- Dialling code: 01767
- Police: Bedfordshire
- Fire: Bedfordshire
- Ambulance: East of England
- UK Parliament: North Bedfordshire

Holme is a hamlet in the civil parish of Biggleswade, in the Central Bedfordshire district of Bedfordshire, England.

The settlement is close to Edworth and Langford. The nearest town to Holme is Biggleswade.

Holme Mill, on the River Ivel, is still a working corn mill, built to replace an earlier mill that burnt down in 1899. A museum and shop opened in 2013. The Holme Mill iron bridge across the lock cut on the Ivel navigation is a scheduled monument.
