= Biggleswade Rural District =

History of Bedfordshire

Coordinates: 52.087°N 0.266°W

- Rural district
- Population
  - 1901: 21,598
  - 1971: 32,735
- History
  - Created: 28 December 1894
  - Abolished: 31 March 1974
  - Succeeded by: Mid Bedfordshire
  - HQ: Biggleswade
- Contained within
  - County Council: Bedfordshire
- Map of boundary as of 1971

Biggleswade was a rural district in Bedfordshire, England from 1894 to 1974. As initially created the district entirely surrounded but did not include Biggleswade, which was an urban district in its own right. In 1927 the parish of Sandy, which bordered Biggleswade, also became an urban district, leaving an island of two urban districts surrounded by the rural district.

== Formation ==
The district had its origins in the Biggleswade Rural Sanitary District. This had been created under the Public Health Acts of 1872 and 1875, giving public health and local government responsibilities for rural areas to the existing Boards of Guardians of Poor Law Unions.

Under the Local Government Act 1894, Rural Sanitary Districts became Rural Districts from 28 December 1894. The link with the Poor Law Union continued, with all the elected councillors of the Rural District Council being ex officio members of the Biggleswade Board of Guardians. The first meeting of the new council was held on 9 January 1895, immediately before a meeting of the Board of Guardians. The previous chairman of the Board of Guardians, Charles Samuel Lindsell, was the first chairman of the council, as well as being reappointed to the role of chairman of the Board of Guardians. The following week he would also be made chairman of the new Biggleswade Urban District Council.

The rural district contained the following civil parishes:

- Arlesey
- Astwick
- Blunham
- Campton and Chicksands
- Clifton
- Dunton
- Edworth
- Everton
- Fairfield
- Henlow
- Langford
- Meppershall
- Moggerhanger
- Northill
- Old Warden
- Potton
- Shefford
- Southill
- Stotfold
- Sutton
- Tempsford

The parish of Sandy was part of Biggleswade Rural District until 1 April 1927, when it was made an urban district.

== Premises ==
Until the 1940s the council used the board room of the Biggleswade Union Workhouse (later termed the Public Assistance Institution) at 142 London Road in Biggleswade as its meeting place. Administrative office functions were carried out at 2 London Road, Biggleswade, which was the office of the solicitor who acted as clerk to both the Biggleswade Rural District and the Biggleswade Urban District.

In 1935 the council purchased a large Victorian house called Ladbrooke at 23 London Road in Biggleswade, converting it for use as their offices. The house did not have a room large enough to act as a council chamber, so meetings of the council continued to be held at the old workhouse, before transferring to the Masonic Rooms (also known as St Andrew's Rooms) on St Andrew's Street in Biggleswade in the early 1940s. A council chamber was later added to Ladbrooke in 1959. Shortly before the council's abolition it also acquired the neighbouring house at 25 London Road for additional office space.

== Abolition ==
Biggleswade Rural District was abolished in 1974 under the Local Government Act 1972, merging with other districts to form the new Mid Bedfordshire district. The new Mid Bedfordshire District Council continued to use the offices at Ladbrooke until 2006. The area now forms part of Central Bedfordshire.
