= Henlow Common and Langford Meadows =

Nature reserve in Bedfordshire, England

Coordinates: 52.05069°N 0.274043°W

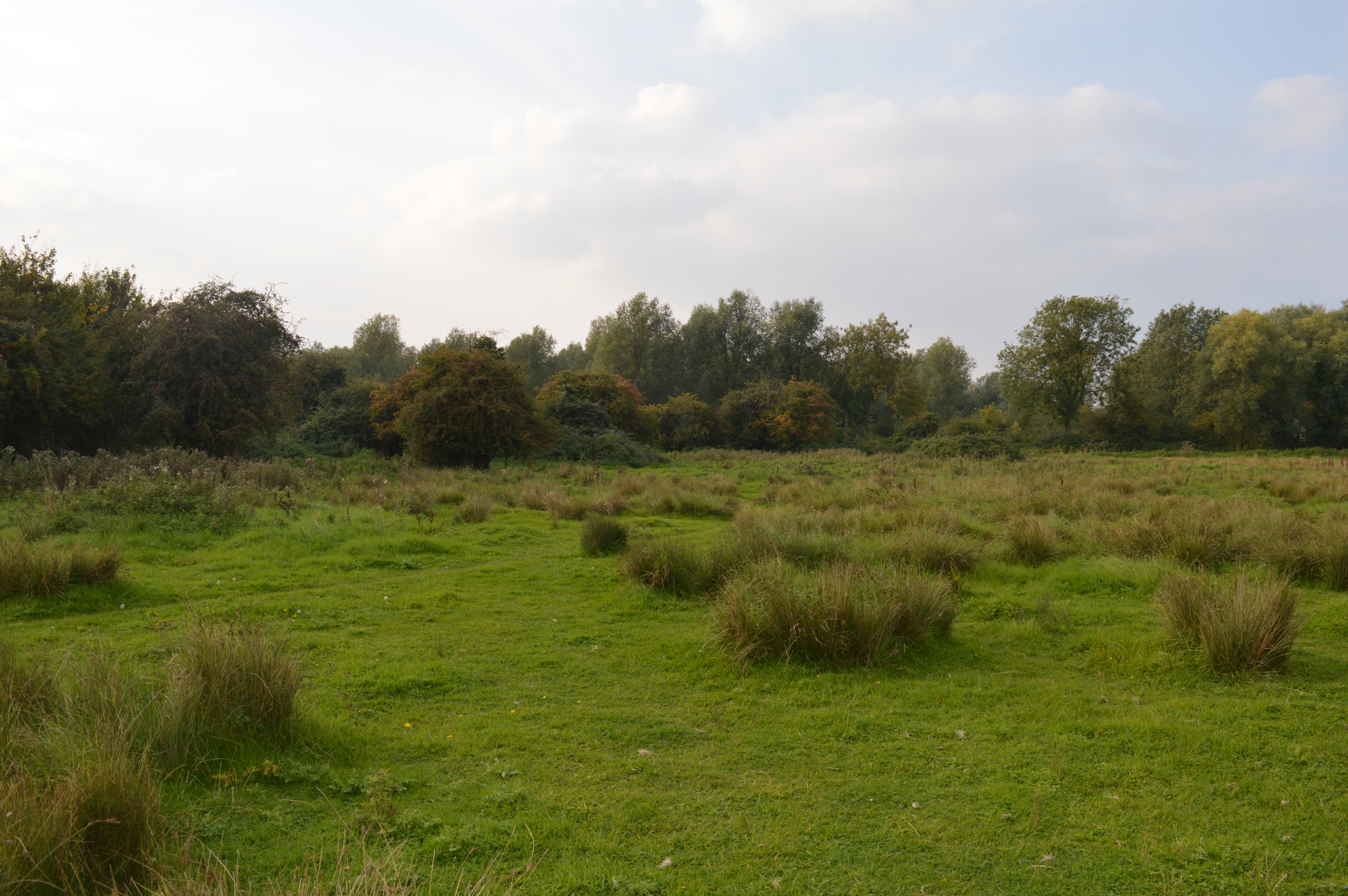
Langford Meadows

Henlow Common and Langford Meadows is a 18.4-hectare (45-acre) Local Nature Reserve on the west side of the River Ivel in Langford. It is owned and managed by Central Bedfordshire Council. Henlow Common is common land.

Despite being two miles north of Henlow, Henlow Common is now situated in Langford parish after an exchange of land in 1985 between the two parishes. As a registered common it keeps its original name. Dams Ditch, earlier called Adams Ditch, runs through the middle of the reserve. It is more like a small river than a ditch.

This site is mainly grassland with areas of scrub and bushes, native trees and a stream. It is an important area for wildlife. Plants include marsh marigolds. Kingfishers are present and the river bank has otters and water voles.

There is access from Langford Road and by a footpath from the High Street.
