= Henlow Brook =

River in Bedfordshire

Location
- Counties: Bedfordshire
- Country: United Kingdom
- Constituent Country: England

Physical characteristics
- Source: Meppershall
- Mouth: River Ivel
  - location: Langford, Bedfordshire
- Length: 8.687 km (5.398 mi)

Henlow Brook is a river in Bedfordshire that is a total length of 8.687 km (5.398 mi). It is one of twenty bodies of the Ivel Operational Catchment. The river rises in Meppershall and joins the Ivel near Langford.

== Course ==
Henlow Brook is a river in Bedfordshire, it rises in Meppershall, it flows through the A600 motorway, then flows through the A507 motorway and meanders through Henlow before joining the River Ivel near Langford. It has a total length of 8.687 kilometres (5.398 mi) and drains a catchment area of 15.947 square kilometres (6.157 sq mi). It is one of twenty bodies of the Ivel Operational Catchment.

== Water quality ==
The Environment Agency measures the water quality of the river systems in England. Each is given an overall ecological status, which may be one of five levels: high, good, moderate, poor and bad.

The water quality of the Henlow Brook system follows as in 2022.

Henlow Brook Water Quality
Water Body	Water Body Type	Hydromorphological Designation	Length	Catchment area	Ecological Status
Henlow Brook	River	Heavily Modified	8.687 km (5.398 mi)	15.947 km^{2} (6.157 sq mi)	Moderate
