= Ireland, Bedfordshire =

Hamlet in Bedfordshire, England

Coordinates: 52.06002°N 0.34836°W

Ireland
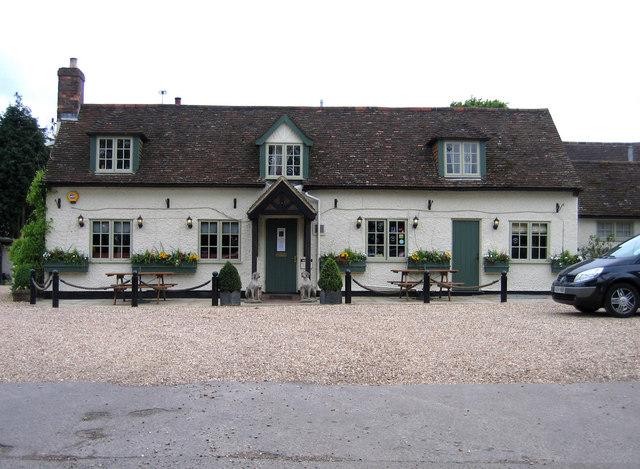
- The Black Horse

- Location within Bedfordshire
- Civil parish: Southill
- Unitary authority: Central Bedfordshire
- Ceremonial county: Bedfordshire
- Region: East
- Country: England
- Sovereign state: United Kingdom
- Post town: SHEFFORD
- Postcode district: SG17
- Dialling code: 01462
- Police: Bedfordshire
- Fire: Bedfordshire
- Ambulance: East of England
- UK Parliament: North Bedfordshire

Ireland is a hamlet in the civil parish of Southill, in the Central Bedfordshire district, in the ceremonial county of Bedfordshire, England.

The hamlet was known as Inlonde in the 16th century.

== Education ==
It is in the catchment zones for Robert Bloomfield Academy and Samuel Whitbread Academy, which is an upper school and sixth form.
