= Samuel Whitbread Academy =

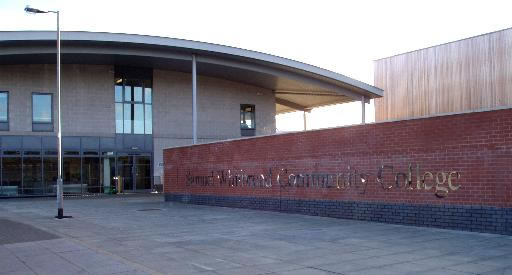

Location
- Shefford Road, Clifton; Shefford, Bedfordshire, SG17 5QS; England; 52°02′13″N 0°19′06″W

Information
- Type: Academy
- Established: 1973
- Department for Education URN: 137948 Tables
- Ofsted: Reports
- Principal: Nick Martin
- Gender: Co-educational
- Age: 13 to 18
- Enrolment: 1851
- Houses: Moore, Obama, Rashford, Sims, Wishaw
- Colours: Black and yellow
- Website: http://www.samuelwhitbread.org.uk/

Samuel Whitbread Academy is an Upper School and Sixth Form with Academy status serving the rural communities around the small market town of Shefford in Central Bedfordshire. Its school campus includes a nursery school and facilities for adult education.

The school has recently won the schools national vase at Twickenham. Both its under 18 and under 15 division went to Twickenham after both teams winning in the semi-finals at Allianz Park (Saracens' home ground). Impressively, both teams lifted the trophy at Twickenham and came home with two victories. The school were also recently crowned School of the Year at the National Rugby Awards.

== History ==
=== 1970s ===
Originally designated Shefford & District Upper School, it was as Samuel Whitbread Upper School that it opened on a purpose-built site on 4 September 1973, as part of Bedfordshire County Council's re-organisation into a 3-tier, non-selective school system. Adult education provision was in place from the beginning under Gordon Ainscough, but the name of the institution was not changed to Samuel Whitbread Upper School and Community College until 1975 (when the 'Headmaster' became the 'Head') and it became Samuel Whitbread Community College, (led by a 'Principal') at some point in the late 90s.

The Headmaster, when the school opened, was Kenneth Dodsworth, and the Chairman of Governors was Alderman W. Inskip.

The original intention was for the school to have an eventual roll of 1100, drawn from the existing secondary modern schools Robert Bloomfield and Etonbury, which were to become middle schools, and from 1975, a planned purpose-built Henlow Middle School.

There were 457 pupils when the school was opened: 249 in what was then the '3rd Year' (now known as Year 9) from the Robert Bloomfield and Etonbury Schools; 94 in the '4th Year' (Year 10) and 117 in the 5th Year (Year 11) who were from Robert Bloomfield only. A vestigial 6th Form of 5 former Robert Bloomfield pupils was enrolled, although 6th form courses were not yet in place.

Thirty teachers were employed in September 1973, the last of whom retired in 2007. At that time there were 25 support staff, including 8 cleaners and 9 kitchen assistants.

=== 21st century ===
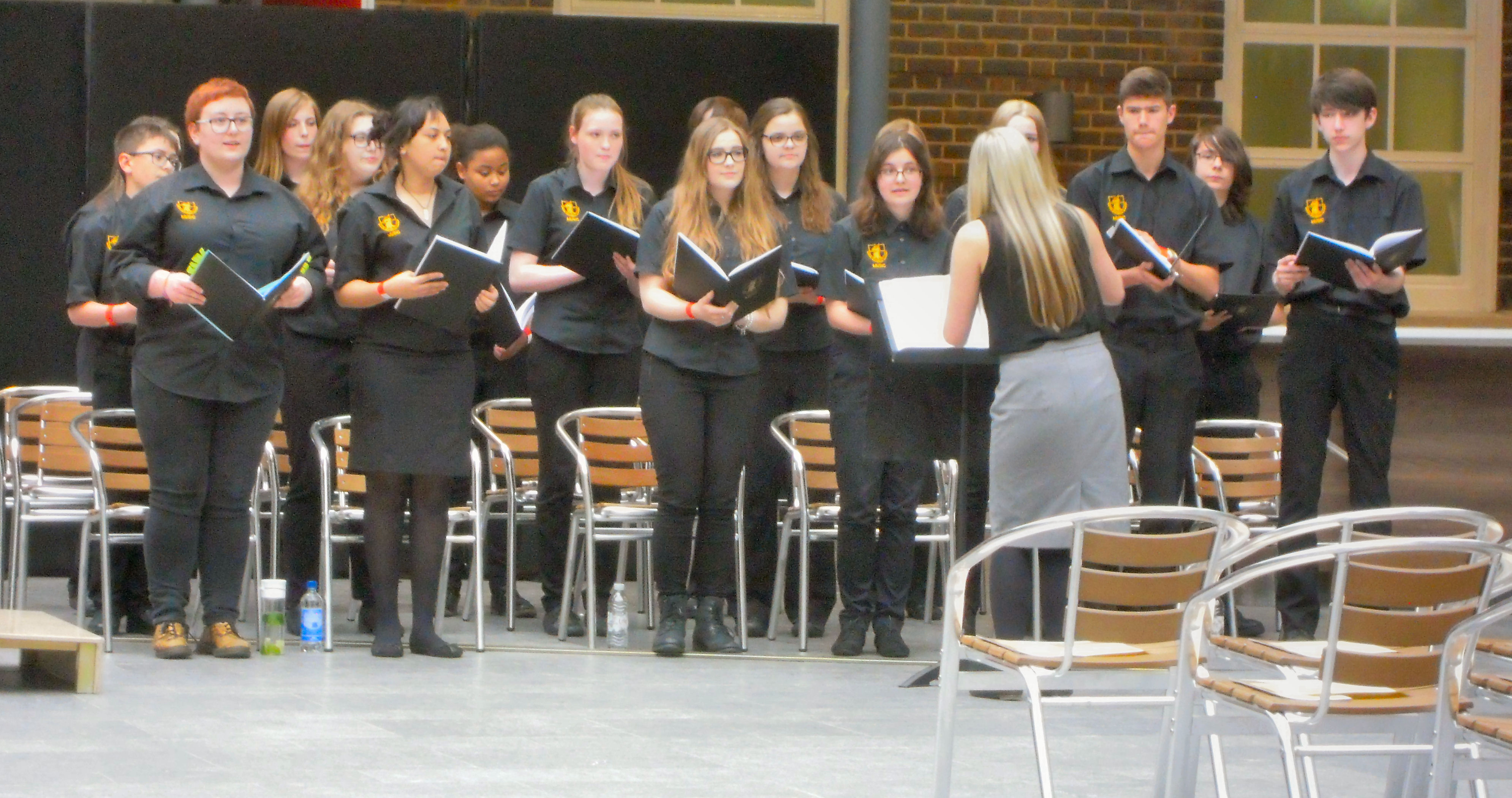
Members of the school choir singing before Prince Philip at the College of Teachers Awards Ceremony in London in 2016

The site was extensively updated to provide new facilities and space for school departments as part of a Private Finance Initiative with the companies Bilfinger Berger, Galliford Try, Gensler and Helaba. The site is owned by Bilfinger Berger and maintained by Galliford Try Facilities Management. The new buildings were officially opened by Queen Elizabeth II on 17 November 2006.

On 1 March 2012, the school officially became an academy and was renamed Samuel Whitbread Academy. Previously the school had been a specialist Engineering College.

Samuel Whitbread's Principal is Nick Martin.

== Catchment area ==
As of 2025 the catchment area includes the following communities: Arlesey, Broom, Campton, Chicksands, Clifton, Henlow, Ireland, Langford, Meppershall, Pegsdon, Shefford, Shillington, Southill, Stanford, Stondon, and Stotfold. Additionally the catchment area includes the majority of each of the following: Astwick, Haynes, Higham Gobion, and Old Warden, along with portions of Northill. Langford is simultaneously in the catchment area for this school and for Stratton Upper School.

== House System ==
To help with managing the large number of students, the school employs a House system, whereby students are separated into five "houses" with which they are associated for their time at the school. Students may change house if they move between form classes, and most change from year 11 to 12 when entering sixth form.

The five Houses are:

- Whishaw – House colour: Red
- Sims – House colour: Green
- Moore – House colour: Purple
- Rashford – House colour: Blue
- Obama – House colour: Turquoise

They are named after Ben Whishaw, David Sims, Tom Moore, Marcus Rashford, and Michelle Obama. These houses were introduced in September 2021 in an attempt to increase diversity amongst the house names. This was chosen through a combination of pupil votes, nominations, and school council decisions. The house colours and shields were kept the same. While 2 racial minorities were added, the representation of women remained at one.

The previous system used Ben Whishaw, Frank Whittle, Ralph Endersby Harwood, Victoria Pendleton, and Laurence Olivier as namesakes. All of whom have a historical connection to Clifton, Shefford.

Before this the houses were Curie and Brunel.

These houses are used to simplify school-wide activities and competitions, such as assemblies. Sporting events will often be organised in 'houses' culminating in the 'SWA House Olympics' at the end of the year. Pupils' uniform is subtly changed to signify their house, with changes to tie and blazer colour.

Houses can earn points throughout the year by succeeding in events like the House Olympics, participating in charity work, or taking more books from the library. The house with the most points at the end of the year are named 'House Champions.'

== The Society ==
The school provides for its highest attaining Sixth Form students a programme to prepare them for Oxbridge and Russell Group universities. This programme is headed by the Head of Sixth Form, Lee Huckle. One aspect of membership of The Society is taking part in the Individual Learning Programme (ILP), in which members specialise in a chosen subject to enhance their learning; they may also participate in activities to prepare them for their applications and interviews with prospective universities.

== Notable alumni ==
- Ben Whishaw, actor, noted for acting the lead roles in Tom Tykwer's film Perfume: The Story of a Murderer and the portrayal of Q in Skyfall, as well as voice acting roles, such as Paddington Bear.
- Jack Collison, a footballer during his time at the school, who has gone on to represent Wales' u21s and full national side as well as playing for West Ham United's first XI.

== Notes ==
- Bedfordshire County Council Education Committee (1973) Reorganisation of schools in the Shefford / South East Bedfordshire Area: Information for parents The Council, Bedford
- Samuel Whitbread Upper School & Community College (1973–1983) School Annals (unpublished chronicle)
