= Cat Ditch =

Tributary of the River Ivel

Physical characteristics
- Source: Slip End
- Mouth: River Ivel
  - location: Astwick
  - coordinates: 52°01′50″N 0°13′19″W
- Length: 8.595 km (5.341 mi)

Cat Ditch is a 8.595 km (5.341 mi) long river and joins the River Ivel near Astwick. It is one of twenty bodies in the Ivel Operational Catchment. The river starts near Slip End.

== Water quality ==
The Environment Agency measures the water quality of the river systems in England. Each is given an overall ecological status, which may be one of five levels: high, good, moderate, poor and bad.

The water quality of the Cat Ditch system follows as in 2022.

Water body	Length	Ecological Status	Catchment Area	Water body type	Hydromorphological designation
Cat Ditch	8.595 km (5.341 mi)	Good	42.989 km^{2} (16.598 sq mi)	River	Heavily modified

== Course ==
Cat Ditch starts near Slip End, flowing through the A505 motorway, then through the settlement of Newnham and meanders to the A1 motorway, where its mouth is located at Astwick, it is a tributary of the Ivel. It has a total length of 8.595 km (5.341 mi) and has a catchment size of 42.989 km^{2} (16.598 sq mi). Cat ditch is one of the twenty bodies in the Ivel Operational Catchment.

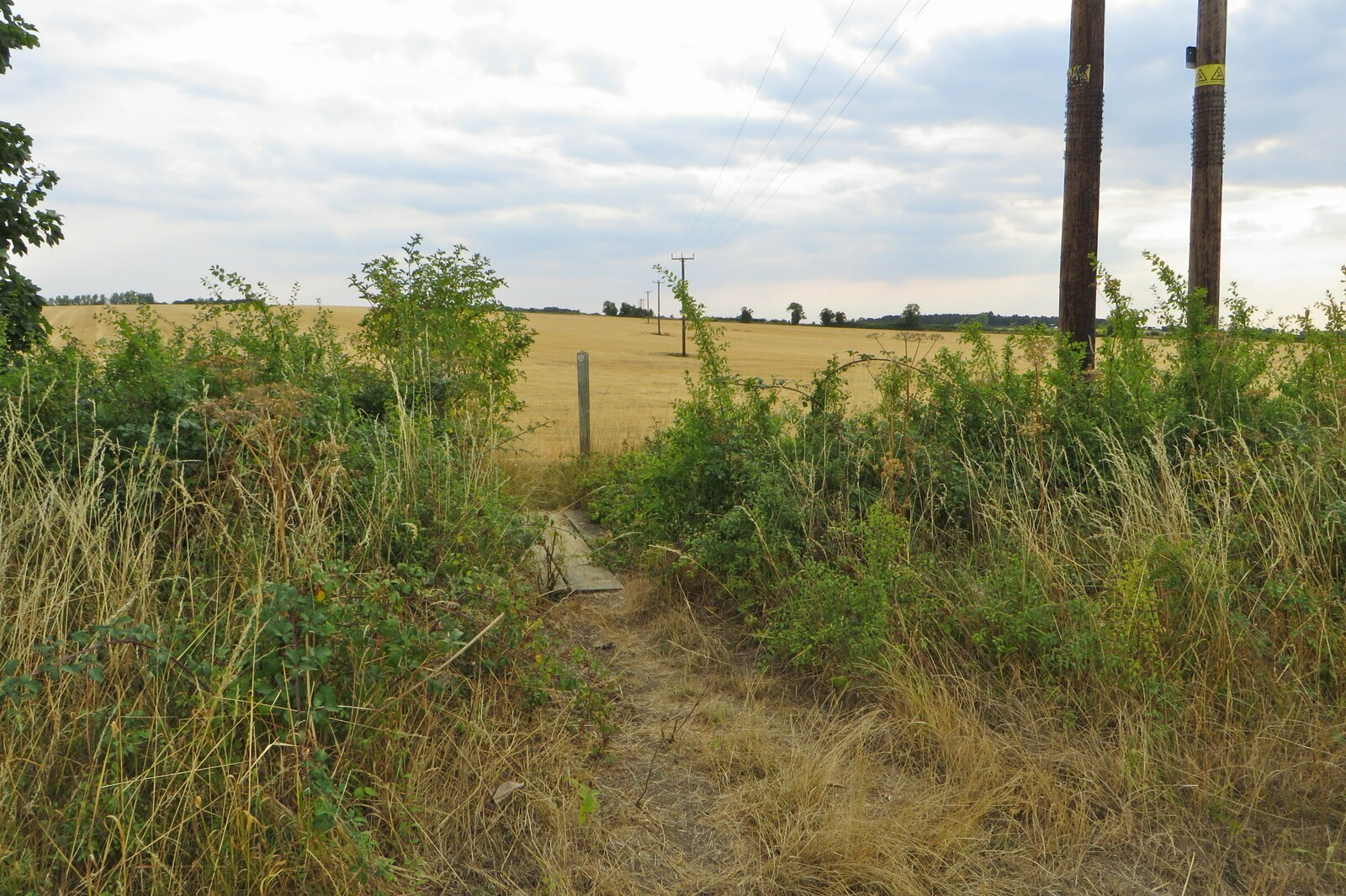
Footbridge over Cat Ditch
