= River Ivel =

River in Hertfordshire and Bedfordshire, England

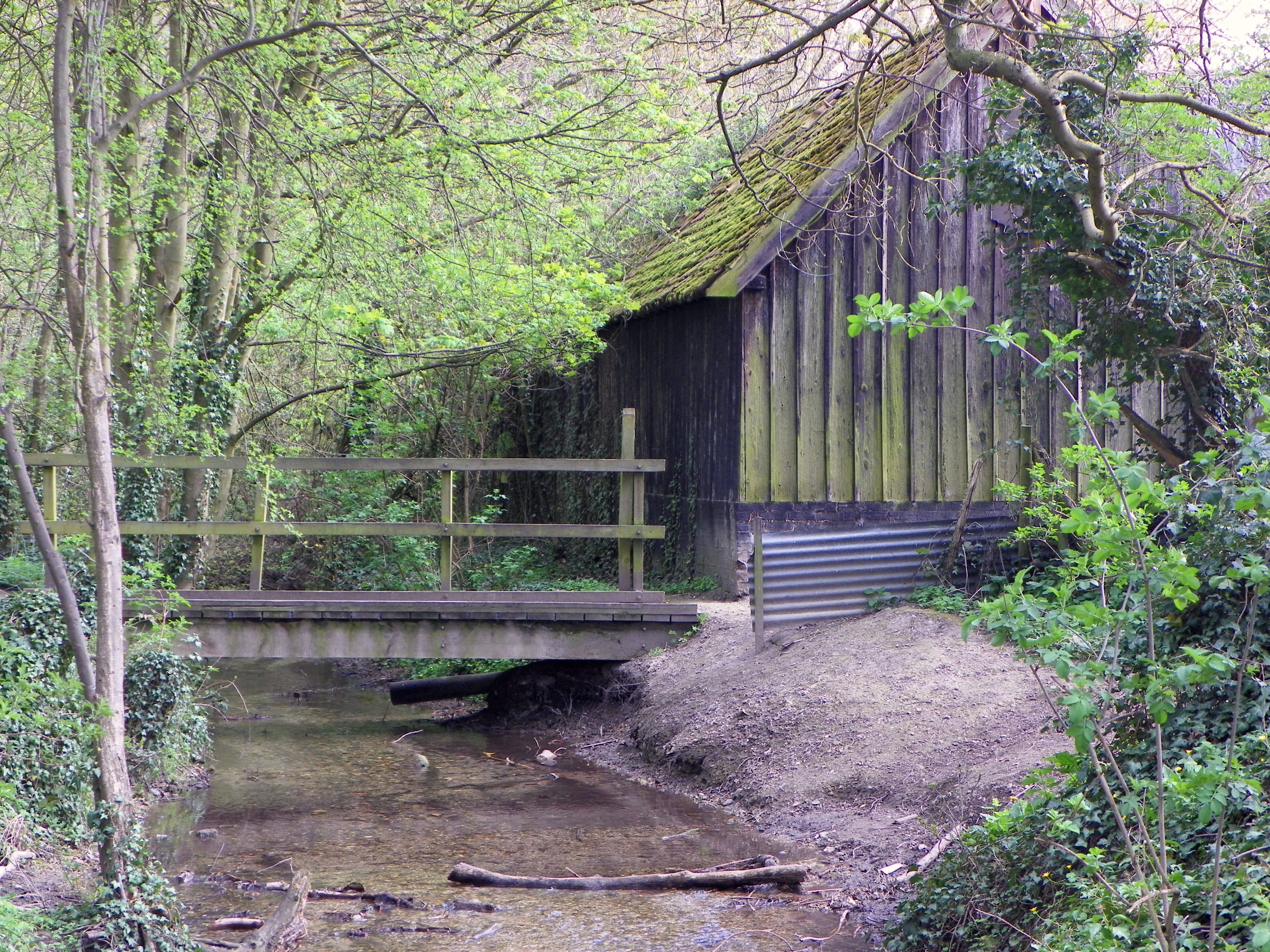
- Footbridge at Radwell

Location
- Country: United Kingdom.
- Counties: Hertfordshire and Bedfordshire
- Settlements: Baldock, Radwell, Stotfold, Arlesey, Henlow, Langford, Biggleswade, Sandy, Tempsford.
- Continent: Europe
- Constituent Country: England

Physical characteristics
- Source
  - location: Ivel Springs, Baldock.
  - coordinates: 51°59′35″N 0°11′31″W
  - elevation: 57 metres (187 ft)
- Mouth: River Great Ouse
  - location: Tempsford, Bedfordshire
  - coordinates: 52°10′04″N 0°18′14″W
  - elevation: 16 metres (52 ft)
- Length: 21 mi (34 km)

Basin features
- Progression: River Ivel → Great Ouse → North Sea
- Tributaries
  - left: Pix Brook, River Hiz, Henlow Brook, River Flit, River Hit and Ickwell Brook.
  - right: Potton Brook and Cat Ditch.

The River Ivel (/ˈaɪvəl/) is a chalk stream in England. It rises at Ivel Springs in Baldock, it flows primarily through Bedfordshire before joining the River Great Ouse at its confluence near Tempsford. The river has a length of 21 mi (34 km). The River Ivel catchment is bounded by the Chiltern Hills to the south and the Greensand Ridge to the north. The River Ivel and its tributaries rise from the springs in the Chiltern Chalk. The river also rises in the East Anglian Chalk.

The Ivel was made navigable under the River Ivel Navigation Act 1757 and it was used for supplying coal and timber to the towns of Biggleswade and Shefford. The canal was extended to Shefford in 1823. Locks were built in Biggleswade, Holme, Stanford and Clifton. The canal was abandoned in 1876, when a dam was built across it at Sandy. The Great Northern Railway caused its gradual decline of the usage of the Ivel Navigation.

In 2021, the Environment Agency released 1,412 barbel into the River Ivel at Biggleswade Mill and Blunham weir.

== Geography ==
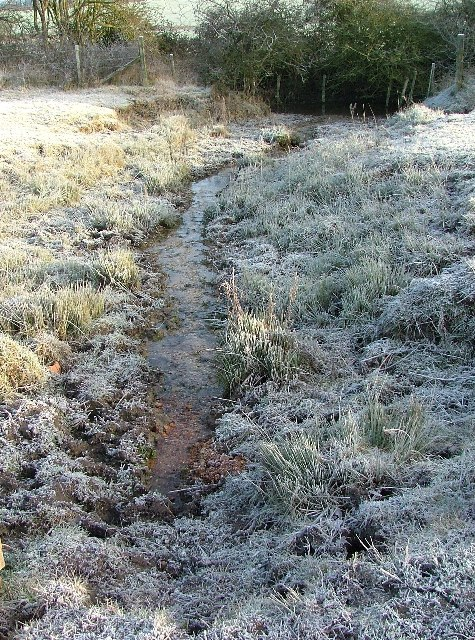
The river at Ivel Springs, the river’s source.

The total length of the river is 21 mi (34 km). Its source is at Ivel Springs near Baldock at an elevation of 57 m (187 ft). The River Ivel flows through the settlements of Radwell, Stotfold, Arlesey, Henlow, Langford, Biggleswade, Sandy, and Blunham, before joining the River Great Ouse near Tempsford at an elevation of 16 m (52 ft). The River Ivel catchment is bounded by the Chiltern Hills to the south and the Greensand Ridge to the north. The River Ivel and its tributaries rise from the springs in the Chiltern Chalk, while the River Ivel also rises in the East Anglian Chalk. It passes through its course to join the Great Ouse. Other watercourses (Running Waters, Chicksands Brook and Millbridge-Common Brooks) rise from the Woburn Sands aquifer. The River Ivel headwaters are predominant in the North Hertfordshire towns of Hitchin, Letchworth and Baldock and the Bedfordshire towns of Ampthill, Biggleswade and Sandy.

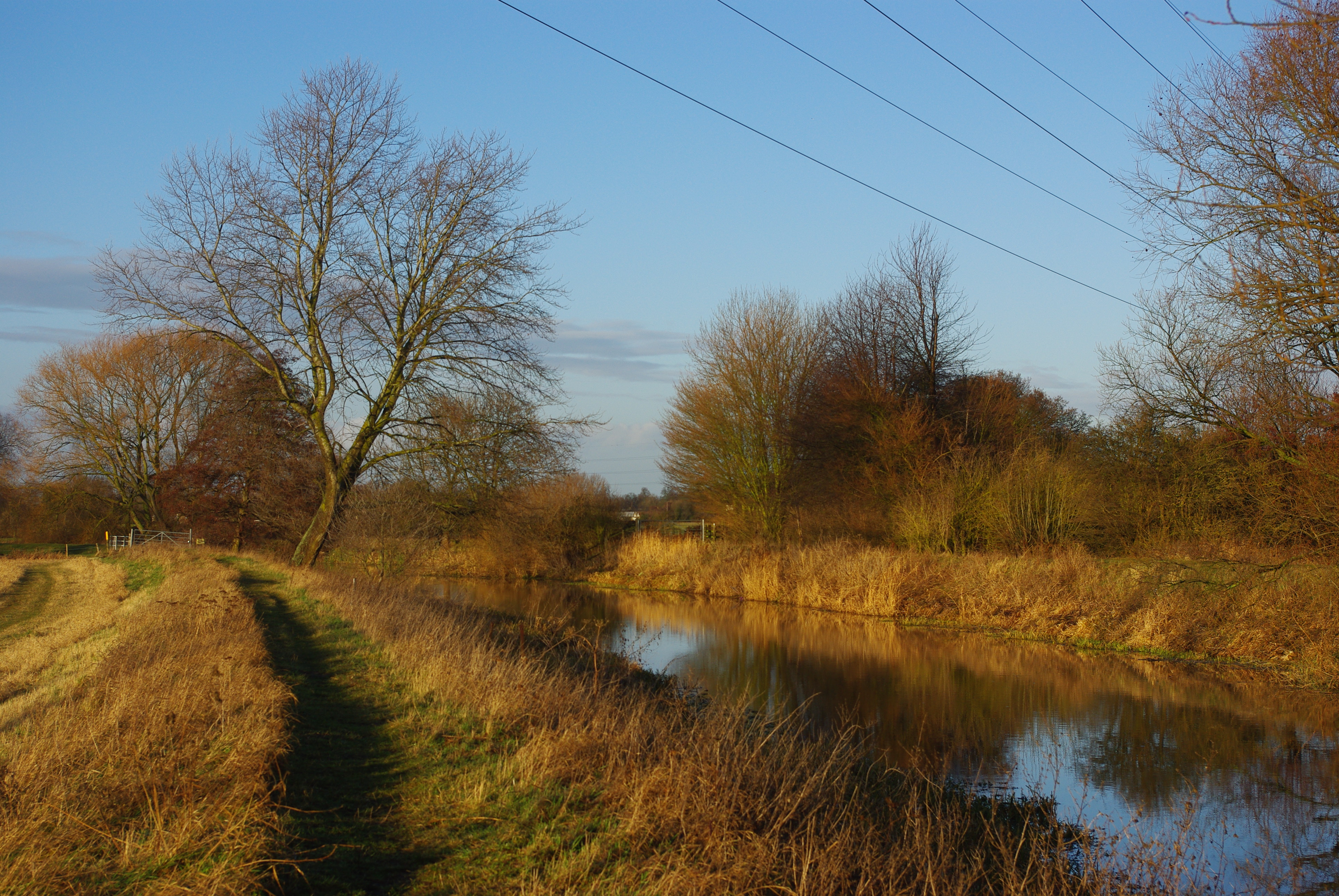
River Ivel north of Blunham

=== Tributaries ===
There are eight notable tributaries of the River Ivel including:

- Pix Brook - it joins the Ivel at its confluence near Arlesey.
- River Hiz - joins the Ivel near Henlow.
- Potton Brook
- Cat Ditch - joins the Ivel near Astwick- a notable tributary.
- Ickwell Brook - it joins the River Ivel near Sandy.
- Henlow Brook - it joins the River Ivel near Langford.
- River Flit
- River Hit

=== Geology ===
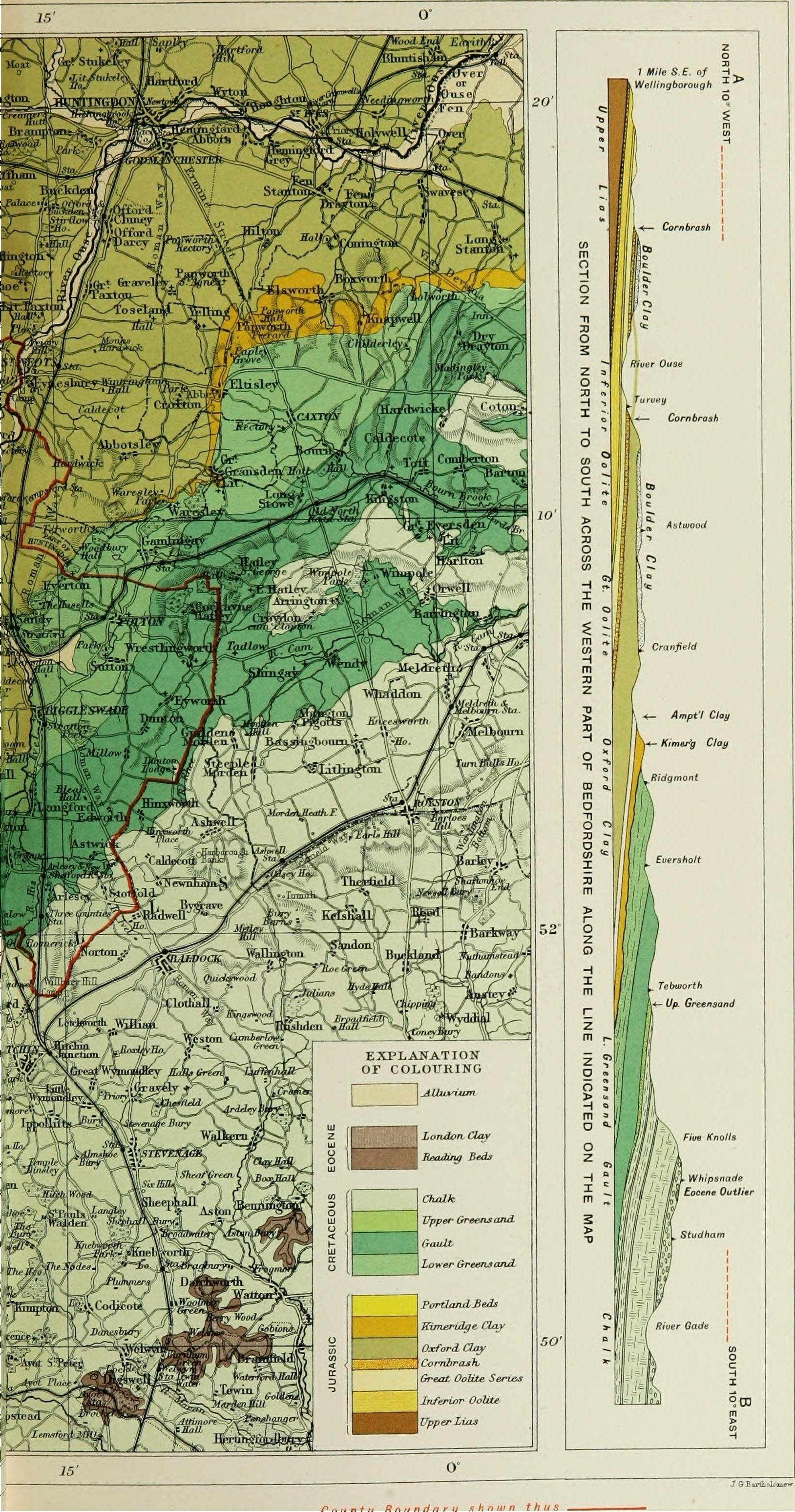
A geological map of the Victorian county of Bedford

In the county of Bedfordshire, there are two sources of aggregate: Pleistocene river and glacial gravel and sands. The valley gravels lie in the Ivel valley. For part of its extent, it is concealed by the boulder clay and alluvium of the valley of the Ivel, and it attains an elevation in the vicinity of Sandy, having a prominent escarpment and its maximum thickness of 220 feet (67 m). In addition to the Ivel valley, Glacio-fluvial deposits are present. Less extensive deposits, in places interbedded with organic muds, occur beside the River Ivel, north of Baldock. Extensive spreads of gravel extend along the Ivel valley. In the New Town church pits, geological data by Edmonds and Dinham in 1965, listed in the table below, recorded:

Geological data by Edmonds and Dinham (1965)
Coarse Gravel	Grey Gravel	Sandy Ocherous Gravel	Flint	Quartzite	Chalk
1.21 m (4 ft 0 in)	1.36 m (4 ft 6 in)	1.21 m (4 ft 0 in)	45%	5%	50%

North of Biggleswade, 10.05 m (33.0 ft) of sand and gravel rests on the Woburn Sands. In a quarry south of Sandy, excavated deposits of the First Terrace revealed the deposition occurring as bars and sheets in a braided river regime. Fossilferous silt within the gravel indicate the deposition accumulated under slow moving or still water in an abandoned meander channels. In Bedfordshire, Lower Cretaceous sandstones are present. The sandstone produces an escarpment which is the Greensand Ridge. It is clear that this feature is around Sandy, where the River Ivel cuts through it.

== Ecology ==
One nature reserve on the River Ivel are the Ivel Springs, the river's source. It has areas of wildlife, including woodland, wetland and pasture. Species in the River Ivel catchment include populations of water vole and otter. The Environment Agency released 1,412 barbel into the River Ivel at Biggleswade Mill and Blunham weir in late 2021.

A study published in the 1960s described the Rivel Ivel as an 'unpolluted chalk stream'. The activity of attached plants and mud kept planktonic algal populations relatively low. The average water velocities rarely exceeded 6 cm (2.4 in)/s in the River Ivel.

== Hydrology ==
The River Ivel at Biggleswade has a normal depth range from 0.13–0.48 m (13–48 cm). On 11 February 2009, it reached a depth of 1.14 m (114 cm). In Blunham, the normal depth range is 0.18–0.55 m (18–55 cm). Its greatest depth was on 3 January 2003, at a depth of 1.45 m (145 cm). The station at Blunham is a crump-weir at a width of 7.31 m (24.0 ft). The Environment Agency splits the River Ivel in two: Ivel (US Henlow) and Ivel (DS Langford to Roxton). Ivel (US Henlow) has a length of 9.669 km (6.008 mi) and a catchment area of 32.318 km^{2} (12.478 sq mi). Ivel (DS Langford to Roxton) has a length of 19.665 km (12.219 mi) and a catchment area of 43.565 km^{2} (16.821 sq mi).

A study published in the mid-1990s described the River Ivel per km fall as less than one metre, compared to Pix Brook's noted 'relatively steep' gradient of 2.8 m (9 ft 2 in) per km fall. The River Ivel is a chalk stream, because it receives baseflow from underlying chalk aquifers. The river and its catchment area, particularly the wetland and the springs, have been heavily modified. The large part of the site was covered with commercial watercress beds, exceeding the surrounding area, with historical maps showing watercress beds north of Baldock.

== Water quality ==
The Environment Agency measures the water quality of the river systems in England. Each is given an overall ecological status, which may be one of five levels: high, good, moderate, poor and bad. There are several components that are used to determine this, including biological status, which looks at the quantity and varieties of invertebrates, angiosperms and fish; chemical status, which compares the concentration of various chemicals against known safe concentrations. Chemical status is rated good or fail.

River Ivel water quality in 2019
Water body name	Ecological status	Chemical	Biological quality elements	Hydromorphological designation
Ivel (US Henlow)	Good	Fail	Good	Heavily modified
Ivel (DS Langford to Roxton)	Moderate	Fail	Good	Heavily modified

== History ==
The Gifle were inhabitants of the River Ivel, where its name remains in the villages of Northill and Southill on the 1086 Domesday Book,(Nortgiuele, Sudgiuele).

River Ivel Navigation Act 1757
- Act of Parliament
- Parliament of Great Britain
- Long title: An Act for making the River Ivel and the Branches there of navigable, from the River Great Ouse at Tempsford in the County of Bedford, to Shotling Mill otherwise called Burnt Mill in the Parish of Hitchin in the County of Hertford, and to Black Horse Mill, in the Parish of Bygrave in the said County of Hertford, and to the South and North Bridges in the Town of Shefford in the said County of Bedford.
- Citation: 30 Geo. 2. c. 62
- Territorial extent: Great Britain

Dates
- Royal assent: 17 May 1757
- Commencement: 2 December 1756 (Note: Start of session.)
Other legislation
Relates to	Ivel Navigation (Abandonment) Act 1876

Status: Current legislation

Text of statute as originally enacted

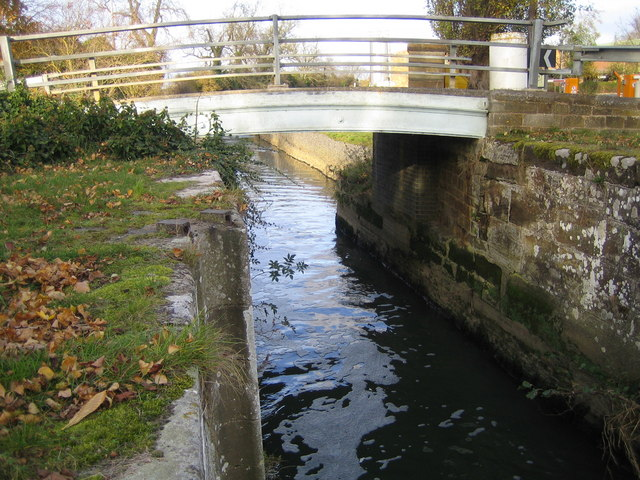
Holme Mill Iron Bridge, a Scheduled monument.

The Rivel Ivel was made navigable for approximately 11 mi (18 km) south in Bedford under the River Ivel Navigation Act 1757 (30 Geo. 2. c. 62). Locks had been constructed at Tempsford, Blunham, South Mills, and Sandy. In 1758, five locks were built from Tempsford to Biggleswade, at a cost of £6,000. The river was made navigable for supplying coal and timber to the towns of Biggleswade and Shefford. The canal had been extended to Shefford in 1823, with locks at Biggleswade, Holme, Stanford and Clifton.

Ivel Navigation (Abandonment) Act 1876
- Act of Parliament
- Parliament of the United Kingdom
- Long title: To provide for the closing of the Ivel Navigation; the Extinction of the Commission; and for other purposes.
- Citation: 39 & 40 Vict. c. cxiv
- Territorial extent: United Kingdom

Dates
- Royal assent: 13 July 1876
Other legislation
Relates to	River Ivel Navigation Act 1757

Text of statute as originally enacted

The canal was abandoned when a dam was built across it at Sandy, having been authorised by the Ivel Navigation (Abandonment) Act 1876 (39 & 40 Vict. c. cxiv). The introduction of the Great Northern Railway caused its decline of the usage of the canal. Remnants, such as Holme Lock, remain close to Jordan's Mill.

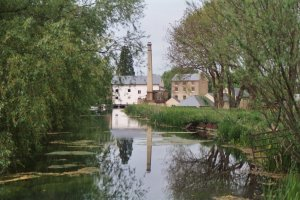
Stotfold Mill, restored after the 1992 fire.

Stotfold Mill, a Grade-II listed watermill on the River Ivel, had one of the widest corn waterwheels in the United Kingdom. It is one of four mills in Stotfold recorded on the 1086 Domesday Book. It is recorded as an early 19th-century structure of gault bricks, with additions and alterations made in the late 19th-century. The earlier parts of the building have weatherboarding on the upper floors. It was destroyed by a fire in 1992 and subsequently rebuilt by the Stotfold Mill Preservation Trust. Other corn mills along the river include Bowman's Mill at Astwick, now a Grade II listed private home, Holme Mill at Holme, still working as a museum, and Franklin's Mill at Biggleswade, converted to apartments. In the 1880s, a map was published and it included a lock, weir, and a mill near Sandy, which is called Sandy Mill, and notably a bridge named "Girtford Bridge" is a Grade II listed building dated in 1783 with three slightly flattened arches. A map published in the 1900s included a mill near Norton, a corn mill in Radwell and Blackhorse Farm near Baldock.

== See also ==
- Potton Brook
- List of rivers of England

== Bibliography ==
- Chris Howes (2023). The River Great Ouse and its Tributaries: including the Rivers Cam, Lark, Little Ouse & Wissey, Hundred Foot River, Relief Channel. Imray, Laurie, Norie and Wilson Ltd. p. 53. ISBN 978-1-78679-568-7.
- Marshall G. Hall (2024). Medieval Bridges of Middle England. Windgather Press. p. 26. ISBN 978-1-914427-30-5.
- Tony Brown (2009). The Environment and Aggregate-Related Archaeology. Oxbow Books. p. 167. ISBN 978-1-78297-280-8.
- Priestley, Joseph (1831). Historical Account of the Navigable Rivers, Canals, and Railways, Throughout Great Britain: As a Reference to Nichols, Priestley & Walker's New Map of Inland Navigation, Derived from Original and Parliamentary Documents in the Possession of Joseph Priestley, Esq. Longman, Rees, Orme, Brown and Green. p. 379.
- Skempton, A. W. (2002). A Biographical Dictionary of Civil Engineers in Great Britain and Ireland. Thomas Telford. p. 208. ISBN 978-0-7277-2939-2.
- Southgate, B. A. (2 October 2013). Advances in Water Pollution Research: Proceedings of the International Conference Held in London, September 1962. Elsevier. p. 324. ISBN 978-1-4832-8391-3.
