= Southill, Bedfordshire =

Village in Bedfordshire, England

Coordinates: 52°03′53″N 00°19′15″W

Southill
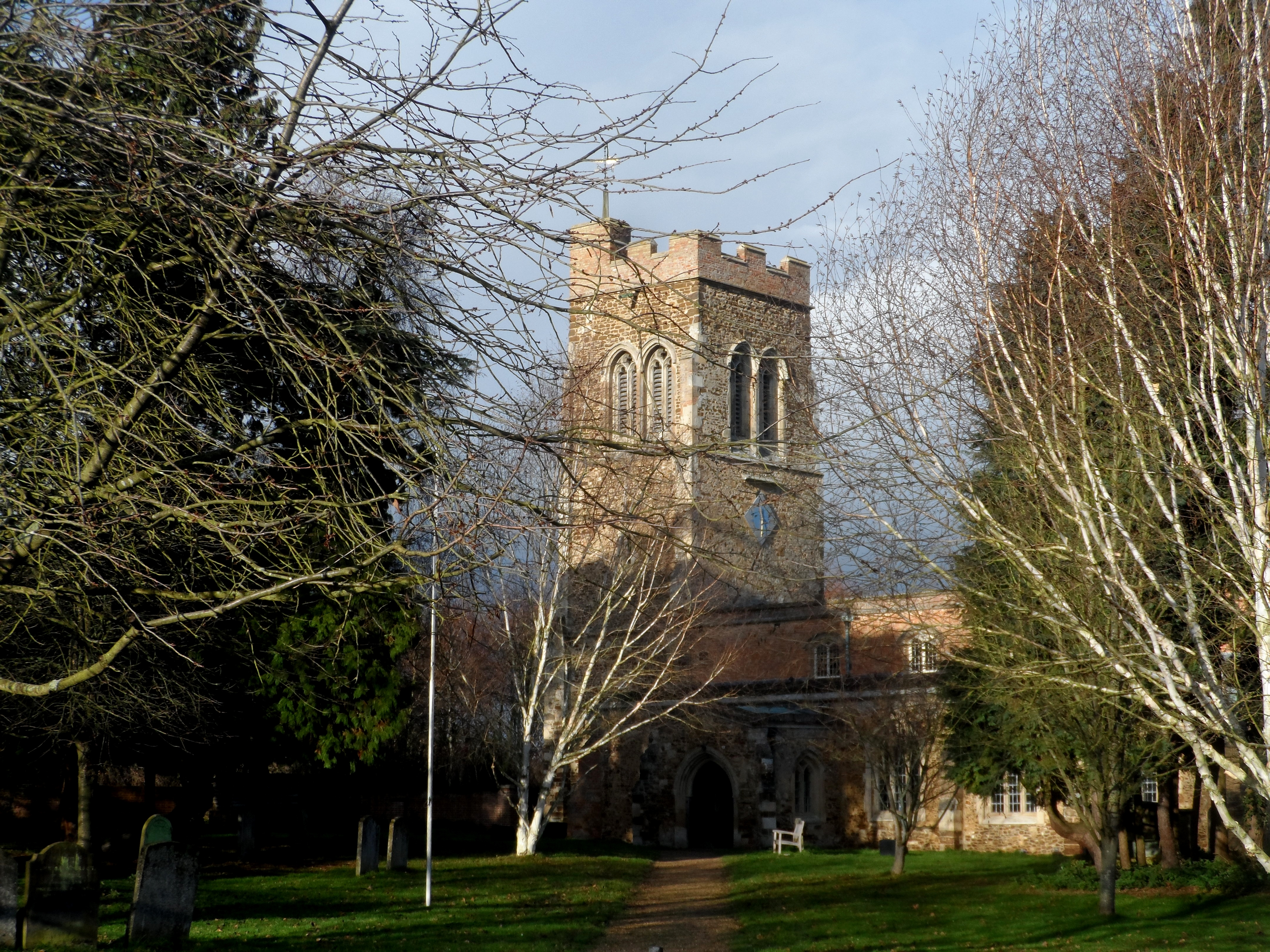
- All Saints' parish church

- Location within Bedfordshire
- Population: 1,141 (2001); 1,192 (2011 Census including Broom , Ireland and Stanford)
- OS grid reference: TL1542
- Civil parish: Southill
- Unitary authority: Central Bedfordshire
- Ceremonial county: Bedfordshire
- Region: East
- Country: England
- Sovereign state: United Kingdom
- Post town: Biggleswade
- Postcode district: SG18
- Dialling code: 01462
- Police: Bedfordshire
- Fire: Bedfordshire
- Ambulance: East of England
- UK Parliament: Mid Bedfordshire

Southill is a rural village and civil parish in the Central Bedfordshire district of the county of Bedfordshire, England; about 8 miles (13 km) southeast of the county town of Bedford.

The 2011 census showed the population for the civil parish as 1,192.

The civil parish includes the villages of Broom and Stanford and the hamlet of Ireland

Its eastern fields are on the plain of the River Ivel; its west is hilly. The village centre is located in a close cluster.

The principal residence, Southill Park, was one of at least four manors, and was for three generations the home of the local branch of the landed Byng family, the Viscounts Torrington, Navy admirals, by whom it was sold at the end of the 18th century to industrialist Samuel Whitbread. Admiral John Byng is buried in All Saints Church, which is a 14th- and 15th-century church embellished in 1814.

== Geography ==
Southill lies about 3 miles (5 km) southwest of Biggleswade, 21 miles (34 km) southwest of Cambridge and 40 miles (64 km) north of London.

Landscape

The village straddles two National Character Areas (NCA) as designated by Natural England. High Street and Stanford Road lie within the Bedfordshire and Cambridgeshire Claylands (NCA 88). Points west fall within the Bedfordshire Greensand Ridge (NCA 90). Central Bedfordshire Council has locally classified the landscape as Lower Ivel Clay Valley (type 4B) where large, open arable fields predominate and the Mid Greensand Ridge (6B) which in addition to arable fields has significant areas of woodland, acid grassland and parkland.

Elevation

The village centre is 44 metres (144 ft) above sea level. The land rises to over 80 metres (262 ft) near Rowney Warren in the west of the parish.

Geology and soil type

High Street and Stanford Road lie on boulder clay over Ampthill clay. The remainder of the village together with Southill Park, Keepers' and Rowney Warrens lies on Lower Greensand. The village centre, Southill Park and west of the parish have low fertility, freely draining, slightly acid loamy soils. Land to the east of Stanford Road and to the north of the village has highly fertile, freely draining, slightly acid but base-rich soil with a loamy texture. Soil south of the village is highly fertile, lime-rich loamy and clayey with impeded drainage.

The night sky and light pollution

The Campaign to Protect Rural England (CPRE) divides the level of night sky brightness into 9 bands with band 1 being the darkest i.e. with the lowest level of light pollution and band 9 the brightest and most polluted. Southill is in band 3.

== History ==
=== Earliest written history ===
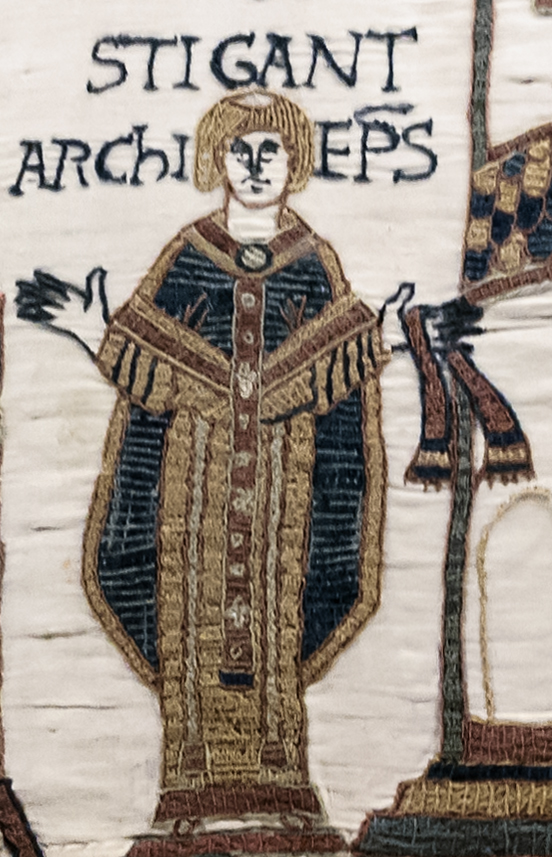
Stigand's office as Archbishop of Canterbury spanned Saxon and Norman monarchies before his fall from grace. He is depicted well in the Bayeux Tapestry.

Southill is part of the ancient hundred of Wixamtree and is mentioned as such seven times in the Domesday Book (detailing Southill landholdings of noblemen or freemen), some of which may be records as under-lords of the others (see subinfeudation). The total tax assessed was 9.7 geld units (very large) and recorded households numbered 29 (quite large). The Book shows sixteen freemen formerly owned its most valuable entry upon conquest, replaced by two Frenchmen at the time of its compilation in 1086. The annual value of this entry was estimated or attested as £3 upon conquest, £4 and a half pounds in 1070, then £4 in 1086. Southill landowners in 1086 included gentry Hugh of Beauchamp, Countess Judith (Judith of Lens) who founded nearby Elstow Abbey in 1078, Walter of Flanders, Richard Poynant, William of Cairon and Alric (Wintermilk) who was a Saxon landowner — his very small £0.2-rated estate was substituted by one of equal worth, though valued at more in the interim and having 40% more ploughlands. The estates of Archbishop Stigand were seized nationwide in 1070 including one here. Earlier seized were two holdings of Leofwin the noble of Caddington taken on conquest and which holder the Book adds held under King Edward's overlordship.

=== Church history ===
All Saints Church, Southill is a 14th- and-15th century church embellished in 1814 built in courses of ferrous rubble stone, part-dressed in ironstone and limestone, altered and extended in red and pale brick. Some areas are cement- or lime-rendered. The church contains floor and wall monuments to local people mainly from the 17th and 18th century, some of which in polychrome marble. It is a listed building in the middle category of statutorily protected heritage, Grade II*.

Its chancel, heightened in brickwork, has a reworked three-pane fifteenth-century main window and similar age five-pane window with a pointed arch facing south by a blocked-off pointed-arch doorway. A sepulchral vault to the Byng family built in rendered brickwork has a round-headed doorway facing their former park to the east. The nave has pointed-arch 5-and-a-half bay arcades, believed to have been built in 1814. The clerestory between the sides above two has four small windows per side. Most windows have plain sub-panes. The narrow aisles have two five-pane and four three-pane reworked late medieval windows, a doorway with pointed head of that date and an earlier pointed-arch three-pane window, a later northwest door and later connection to the Byng vault. It small south porch ends in a gable, above a pointed-arch entrance supported by angle buttresses. The fifteenth-century west tower has three stages with opposing square and clasping lightly buttressing walls topped by pale brick-built battlements of differing heights. The west door has traceried spandrels, surmounted by a three-light window. The roofwork, low-slant, and seating is circa 1814. The font was designed in 1937 by Sir Albert Richardson.

The Byng vault includes George Viscount Torrington, Rear Admiral who died in 1732 and Admiral John Byng, executed 1757.

=== Later descriptions ===
In 1805, a gazetteer reads:

"SOUTH HILL, or SOUTHILL, (Bedf.) village distance from Shefford 2 miles North which gives title of baron to Viscount Torrington, whose family seat is here. On a monument in the church is an inscription to the memory of the Hon. John Byng, Vice Admiral of the Blue, who fell a martyr to political persecution, March 14, 1757. Near it is Wardon, or De Sartes abbey, founded by Walter Espec, in 1135, for Cistercian monks."

The equivalent in 1914 reads:

parish and village with railway station (1½ miles northwest, Midland Railway), east Bedfordshire; parish[...5,734 acres (23.20 km^{2})], population: 989, [population of] ecclesiastical district: 954; village 3 miles southwest of Biggleswade; Post Office; Telegraph Office at station. In vicinity is Southill Park, seat".

— Bartholomew's Gazetteer

=== Executed Admiral, The Honourable John Byng ===
An event was held in the village in March 2007 and an eponymous real ale was brewed by B&T Brewery in Shefford to commemorate the 250th anniversary of the execution of Admiral Byng.

=== Former amenities ===
The first mention of a post office in the village is in 1850. Post Office archives record the issue to Southill on 6 August 1850 of a type of postmark known as an undated circle. Rubber datestamps were issued in May 1889 and April 1895. The village post office closed on 14 October 2008. It was one of about 2,500 compensated closures of UK branches announced by the Government in 2007.

Southill railway station provided passenger services until 1961 on the now dismantled Bedford-Hitchin line.

== Governance ==
Southill elects three councillors to the parish council. It is part of Northill ward for elections to the Central Bedfordshire Unitary Authority.

Prior to 1894, Southill was administered as part of the hundred of Wixamtree. From 1894 until 1974 it was part of Biggleswade Rural District and from 1974 to 2009 in Mid Bedfordshire District.

Southill is in the Mid Bedfordshire parliamentary constituency and since the 2023 Mid Bedfordshire by-election the elected member is Alistair Strathern of the Labour Party.

== Amenities ==
The village has an active congregation in its church and the following:

- A small park with playground, Southill Play Area toward the east of its clustered core.
- Two village halls at Southill and technically at Broom which remains part of the civil (secular) parish as well as the ecclesiastical parish thus run by the same organisation. The latter by way of example is used by clubs, groups and pre-schools and pre-planned parties and receptions. It is usually available by prior arrangement at weekends.
- The White Horse pub-restaurant
- The parish has the Black House pub-restaurant, see Ireland, Bedfordshire, this is a 500 metres (1,600 ft) walk from the heart of Southill.

== Education ==
Southill is home to a lower school, Southill Lower School, which educates children to the age of 9 and shares in leadership and combines in projects and programmes with Shelton Lower School. Ofsted's November 2025 inspection of Southill Lower School reports a "Strong" standard on all areas, except for the "Early years" area which was given the "Expected" standard. Ofsted reported their safeguarding standards were met by Southill Lower School.

It is in the catchment zone for Robert Bloomfield Academy. It is also in the catchment zone for Samuel Whitbread Academy, which has an upper school and sixth form.

== Public transport ==
Bus route 200 operated by Grant Palmer timetables two morning journeys, Monday to Saturday to Biggleswade (journey time 13 minutes) and two afternoon journeys to Shefford and Flitwick. Community operator Wanderbus runs a Wednesday-only service to Bedford and monthly services to St Neots, Milton Keynes and Welwyn Garden City.

The nearest railway station is Biggleswade. Thameslink services from this station head towards Peterborough and Horsham; the latter destination allows travel to London stations such as London Bridge and City Thameslink.
