= Henlow Camp =

Village in Bedfordshire, England

Coordinates: 52.00877°N 0.3035°W

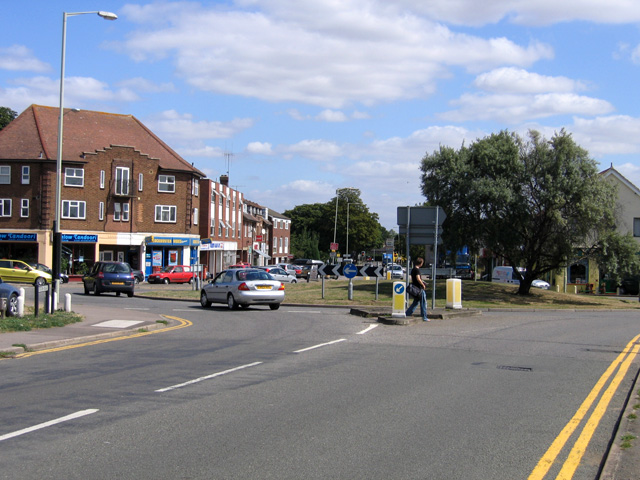

- Location within Bedfordshire
- OS grid reference: TL165358
- Civil parish: Henlow
- Unitary authority: Central Bedfordshire
- Ceremonial county: Bedfordshire
- Region: East
- Country: England
- Sovereign state: United Kingdom
- Post town: HENLOW
- Postcode district: SG16
- Dialling code: 01462
- Police: Bedfordshire
- Fire: Bedfordshire
- Ambulance: East of England
- UK Parliament: Hitchin

Henlow Camp is a village in Bedfordshire, England.

== Village ==
RAF Henlow was first established in the area during World War I. Henlow Camp, as a civilian settlement, has grown up around the station since this time. Though Henlow Camp is part of the Henlow civil parish, it is located nearer to the village of Stondon (where the 2011 Census population was included).

Although a small settlement, Henlow Camp offers a range of amenities that cater to both residents and personnel at the RAF base, as well as the surrounding community. Amenities include Derwent Lower School, several shops, a public house and bed and breakfast and a golf course. The Henlow greyhound racing track closed permanently on 21 January 2024.
