= Ivel Springs =

Nature reserve in Hertfordshire, England

Coordinates: 51.9942°N 0.1939°W

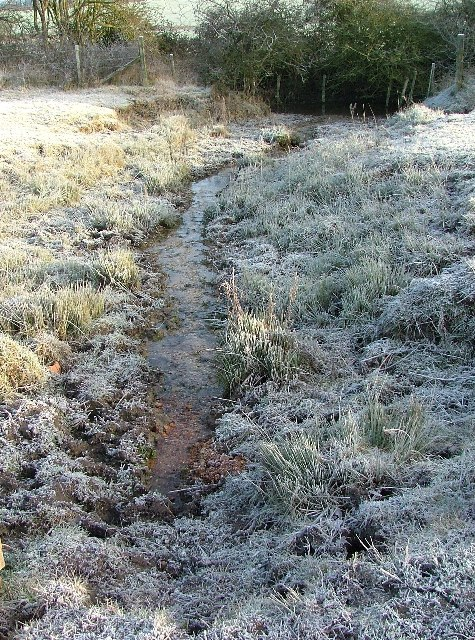

Ivel Springs is a 15.4 hectare Local Nature Reserve on the urban fringe of Baldock in Hertfordshire. It is owned and managed by North Hertfordshire District Council, assisted by the Friends of Baldock Green Spaces.

== History ==
The site, which was a rubbish dump until the 1950s, was declared a Local Nature Reserve by Hertfordshire County Council in 2007. The grazing area of the wildflower meadow is the site of a farming settlement that has Scheduled Monument status. In 2025, the reserve was awarded Green Flag status for the eleventh consecutive year.

== Geography ==
It has habitats of woodland, wetland and pasture with a wide variety of wildlife. Its springs are the source of the River Ivel. Located at a grid reference of TL 24166 34529, its elevation is at 56 metres (184 ft).

== River Ivel restoration ==
Affinity Water, which extracts groundwater in the area, carried out restoration work to the Ivel riverbed and banks, and constructed a seasonal wetland at the reserve in 2023–24.

== Access ==
There is vehicle access to the site from the A507 (North Road), and pedestrian access from Norton Road and Icknield Way (via a tunnel under the railway embankment).
