= Langford, Bedfordshire =

Village in Bedfordshire, England

Coordinates: 52°03′19″N 0°16′19″W

Langford
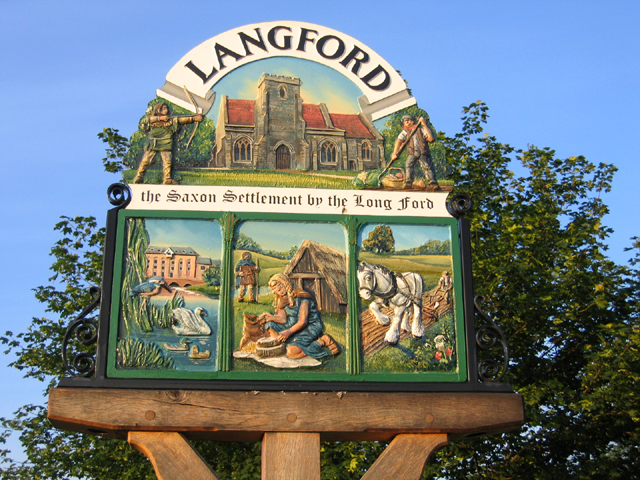
- Langford village sign

- Location within Bedfordshire
- Population: 3,091 (2011 Census)
- OS grid reference: TL185405
- Unitary authority: Central Bedfordshire
- Ceremonial county: Bedfordshire
- Region: East
- Country: England
- Sovereign state: United Kingdom
- Post town: Biggleswade
- Postcode district: SG18
- Dialling code: 01462 and 01767
- Police: Bedfordshire
- Fire: Bedfordshire
- Ambulance: East of England
- UK Parliament: Hitchin

Langford is a village and civil parish in the Central Bedfordshire district of the county of Bedfordshire, England about 10 miles (16 km) south-east of the county town of Bedford. The 2011 census gives the population as 3,091.

== Geography ==
Langford is a straggling village, nearly two miles long, alongside and to the east of the River Ivel. It is about 2.3 miles (4 km) south of Biggleswade, 19.5 miles (31 km) south-west of Cambridge and 38 miles (61 km) north of London.

The East Coast Main Line railway passes through the parish at the eastern edge of the village.

Landscape

The village is within the Bedfordshire and Cambridgeshire Claylands National Character Area (NCA 88) as defined by Natural England. Central Bedfordshire Council has designated the local landscape as Lower Ivel Clay Valley in the northern section of the village and parish, and Upper Ivel Clay Valley in the southern section. Large, open arable fields are prominent to the east of the village.

Henlow Common and Langford Meadows local nature reserve is beside the Ivel. Lakes formed from old sand and gravel quarries are to the south of the village.

Seven of the ten wind turbines commissioned in 2013 at Biggleswade Wind Farm are within the parish. Each tower is 65 metres (213 ft) tall with four 45 metres (148 ft) blades. To the southeast of the village is a solar farm commissioned in 2015. The two installations have electrical generating capacities of 20 MW and 13 MW respectively.

Elevation

The village centre is 35 metres (115 ft) above sea level. The land rises to over 70 metres (230 ft) towards Topler's Hill in the east of the parish.

Geology and soil type

Langford village lies on river gravel and the arable fields to the east on boulder clay over Gault. The village itself has highly fertile, freely draining, slightly acid but base-rich soil with a loamy texture. By the Ivel are loamy and clayey floodplain soils, with moderate fertility and naturally high groundwater. To the east are highly fertile, lime-rich loamy and clayey soils with impeded drainage.

Roads and footpaths

The B659 road (formerly A6001) (High Street/Church Street) is the main route through the village, leading north to Biggleswade and south to Henlow. Cambridge Road runs east to the A1 road from the southern end of the village. Station Road links Church Street to Cambridge Road.

A public bridleway leads from Common Road to Henlow. Separate footpaths from Station Road and Cambridge Road join to reach Astwick and Stotfold. There are paths from East Road to Biggleswade.

The night sky and light pollution

The Campaign to Protect Rural England (CPRE) divides the level of night sky brightness into 9 bands with band 1 being the darkest i.e. with the lowest level of light pollution and band 9 the brightest and most polluted. Langford is in bands 4 and 5.

== History ==
Population growth in Langford since 1801
Year	Pop.	±%
1801	458	—
1841	840	+83.4%
1881	1,242	+47.9%
1921	1,205	−3.0%
1961	1,379	+14.4%
2001	2,876	+108.6%
Source: Bedfordshire Archives and Records Service

Of Saxon origin, the village was first mentioned in 944 AD and at one time it had one or more fording points across the river. The name is based on the words long ford from the length of the settlement. At the time of the Domesday Book 1086, the population was around 21. The Church of England parish church is St. Andrew's. Before 1066 the lord of Langford was Lewin, a thane of Edward the Confessor. William the Conqueror granted the village to Walter le Fleming. In 1142 Walter's descendant Simon de Wahull gave land to the Knights Templar, who established themselves as Lords of the Manor of Langford Rectory.

The entry in the Domesday Book reads: Langeford: Walter of Flanders. 2 mills.

=== 1960 air accident ===
On Wednesday 16 November 1960 BAC Jet Provost G-AOUS crashed. The aircraft hit the village playing field, after the wings had snapped beforehand. 34 year old Lt-Cdr John Richard Stanley Overbury, the company test pilot, was killed. He had been at Luton as the test pilot since 1957.

== Governance ==
Langford Parish Council consists of ten elected councillors.

Langford is part of Stotfold and Langford ward for elections to the Central Bedfordshire Unitary Authority.

Prior to 1894, Langford was administered as part of the Hundred of Biggleswade. From 1894 until 1974 it was in Biggleswade Rural District and from 1974 to 2009 in Mid Bedfordshire District.

Langford is in the Hitchin parliamentary constituency, the elected member is Alistair Strathern of the Labour Party. Before 1997 it was in Mid Bedfordshire constituency, then in North East Bedfordshire until 2024.

== Education ==
The village is in the catchment zone for two schools: Samuel Whitbread Academy and Stratton Upper School.

== Sport ==
Langford F.C. compete in the Spartan South Midlands League Division One and play their home matches at Forde Park. The women's team currently compete in the South East Combination Women's League. A few seasons ago, they were members of the Women's Premier League.

King George's Field is the home of the Langford Youth football team and Langford Cricket Club.

== Notable residents ==
A.W. Lawrence, Professor of Archaeology at the University of Cambridge, youngest brother of T. E. Lawrence (Lawrence of Arabia), lived in Langford with his wife for a time in the 1980s.

Ben Whishaw, stage and film actor, spent part of his childhood in Langford
