= River Hit =

Watercourse in Bedfordshire

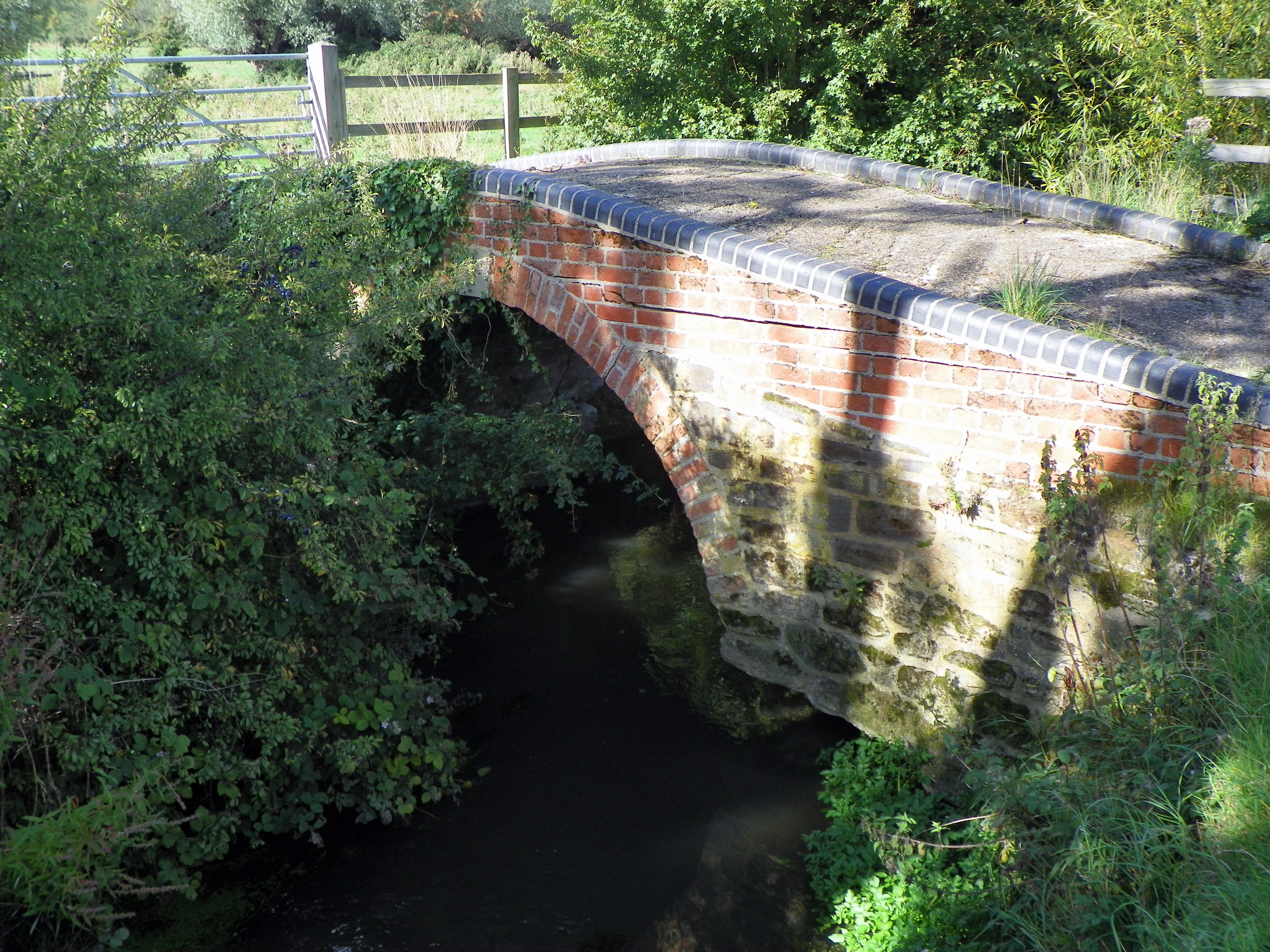
- Cow bridge over the River Hit, near Meppershall, Bedfordshire

Physical characteristics
- Source: Streatley
- Mouth: River Flit
  - location: Shefford
- Length: 6.04 km (3.75 mi) (Note: Campton Brook is a continuation of New Inn Brook; New Inn Brook has a length of 11.172 km (6.942 mi).)

Basin features
- Tributaries
  - right: Barton Brook

Campton Brook or the River Hit is a river in Bedfordshire, and it is a continuation of New Inn Brook. The length of the Campton Brook is 6.04 km (3.75 mi) and it has a catchment area of 8.95 km^{2} (3.46 sq mi). Whereas New Inn Brook’s length is at 11.172 km (6.942 mi) and a catchment area of 21.811 km^{2} (8.421 sq mi).

== Course and tributaries ==
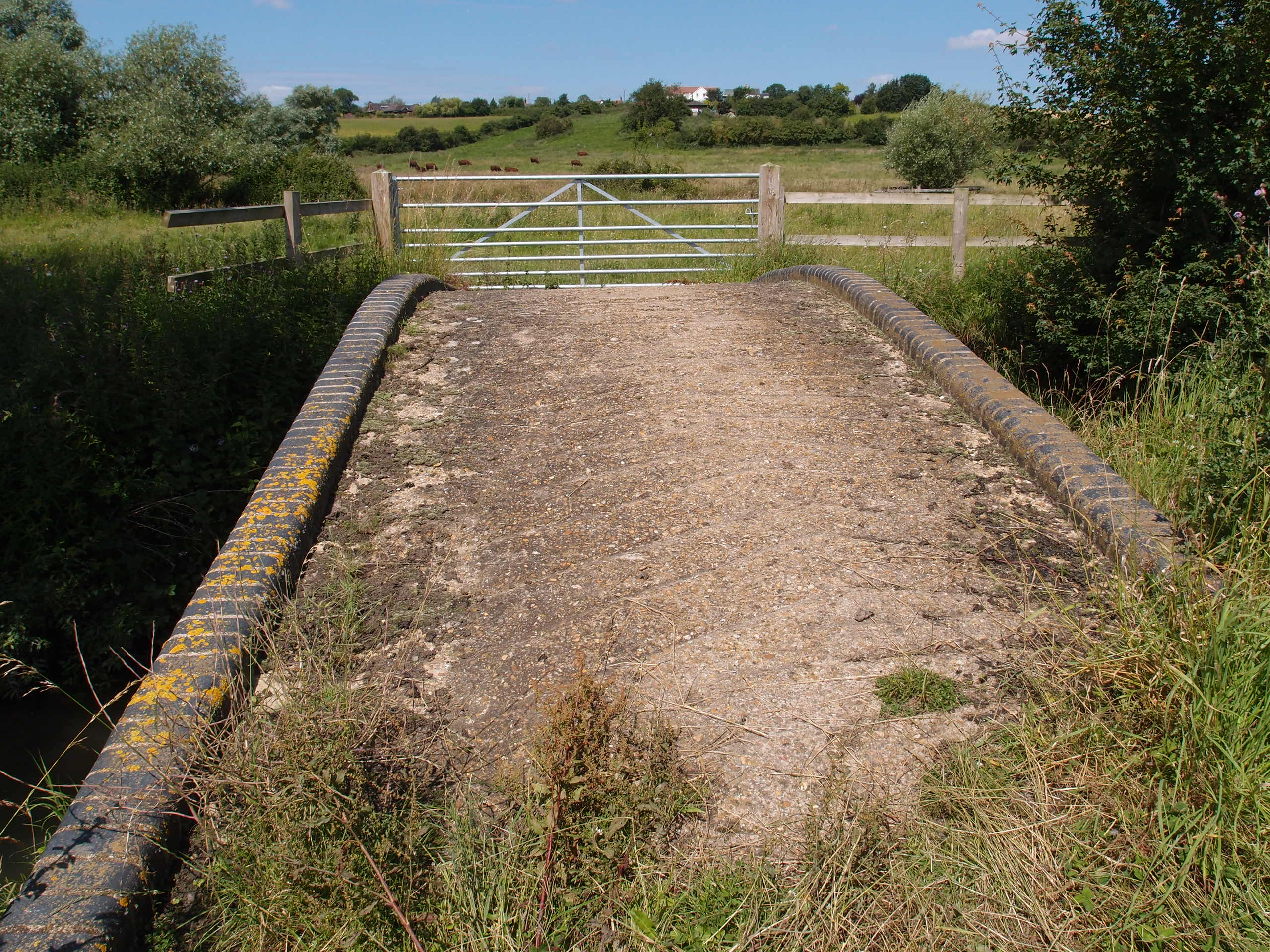
Cow bridge on the River Hit.

Campton Brook is a continuation of New Inn Brook.

New Inn Brook starts near Streatley flowing through north west of Sharpenhoe and traverses into the Campton Brook near Lower Gravenhurst. New Inn Brook has a total length of 11.172 km (6.942 mi) and a catchment area of 21.811 km^{2} (8.421 sq mi).

Campton Brook continues to flow near Upper Gravenhurst, then through Campton before joining the River Flit at its confluence in Shefford. It has a total length of 6.04 km (3.75 mi) and a catchment area of 8.95 km^{2} (3.46 sq mi).

The two water bodies: Campton Brook and New Inn Brook are two out of the twenty bodies in the Ivel Operational Catchment.

A notable tributary of the Campton Brook is Barton Brook, it joins at its confluence near Lower Gravenhurst.

== Water quality ==
The Environment Agency measures the water quality of the river systems in England. Each is given an overall ecological status, which may be one of five levels: high, good, moderate, poor and bad.

The water quality of the Campton Brook system is in the table below.

Water Quality of Campton Brook
Water body	Water Body Type	Catchment Area	Length	Ecological Status	Hydromorphological Designation
Campton Brook (Hit)	River	8.95 km^{2} (3.46 sq mi)	6.04 km (3.75 mi)	Moderate	Heavily modified
New Inn Brook	River	21.811 km^{2} (8.421 sq mi)	11.172 km (6.942 mi)	Moderate	Heavily modified

== See also ==
- River Flit
- Bedfordshire
- Shefford
