= Clifton, Bedfordshire =

Village in Bedfordshire, England

Coordinates: 52.0398°N 0.3017°W

Clifton
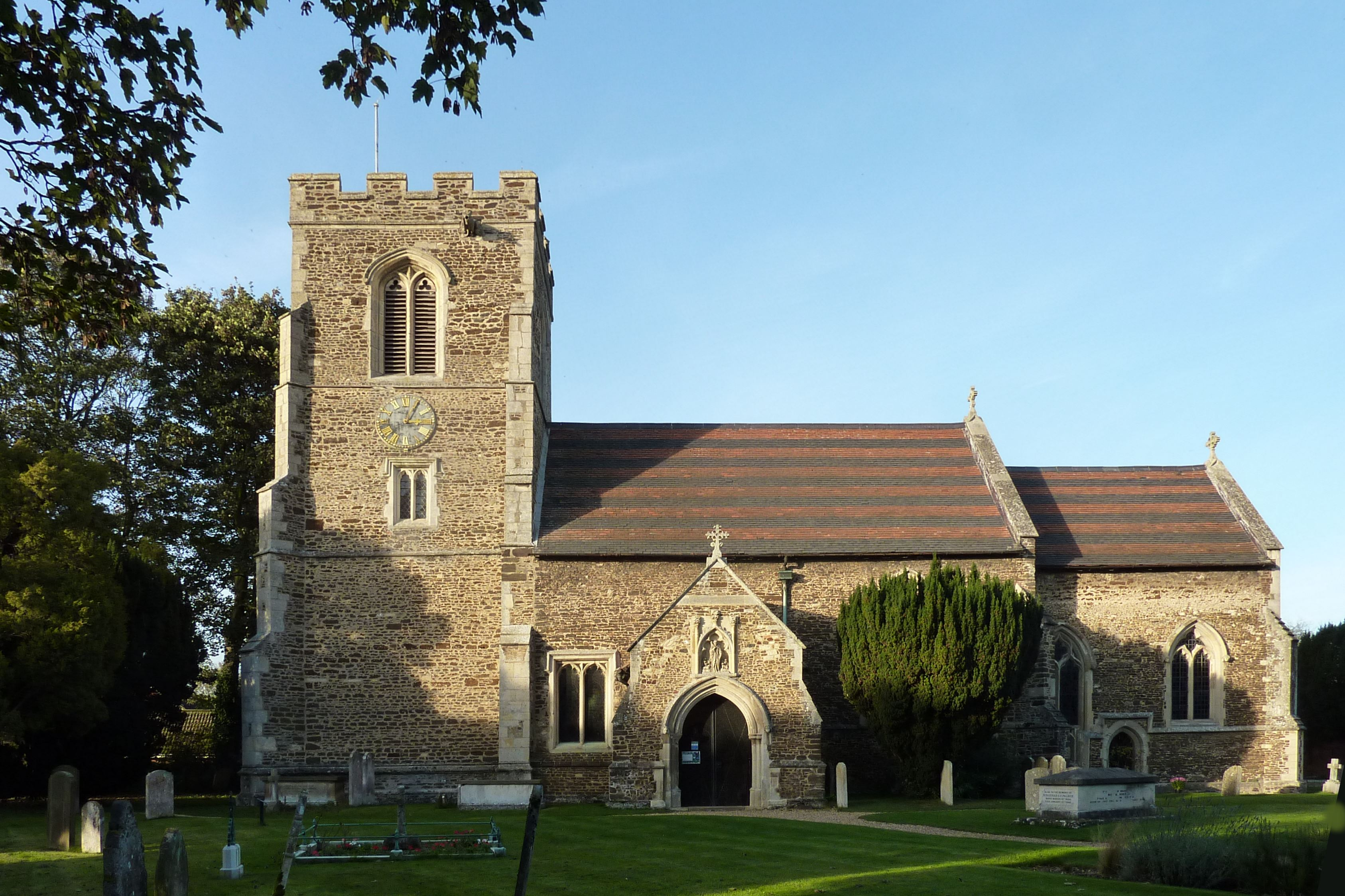
- All Saints Church

- Location within Bedfordshire
- Population: 2,878 (2011 Census)
- Unitary authority: Central Bedfordshire
- Ceremonial county: Bedfordshire
- Region: East
- Country: England
- Sovereign state: United Kingdom
- Post town: Shefford
- Postcode district: SG17
- Dialling code: 01462
- Police: Bedfordshire
- Fire: Bedfordshire
- Ambulance: East of England
- UK Parliament: Hitchin

Clifton is a village and civil parish in the English county of Bedfordshire. The original hundred of Clifton is named after it.

The original "hundred" comprised: The Parishes of Arlesey; Campton-Cum-Shefford; Chicksands; Clifton; Henlow; Holwell; Meppershall; part of Shillington; Lower Stondon; Little Holwell; Stotfold; Upper Stondon.

The first recorded reference to Clifton is in 944 when it is referred to as Cliftune. Clifton is also mentioned in the Domesday Book. The entry reads:

Cliftone: William de Cairon from Bishop of Lincoln, Eudo FitzHubert and Nigel d'Aubigny; Leofwin from St. Benedict's of Ramsey; Alwin from Countess Judith. 2 mills.

All Saints Church, built in the 14th and 15th centuries was heavily restored in the nineteenth century.

Clifton village is now a popular place to live as a consequence of its good transport links and proximity to the railway station at Arlesey.

Clifton was voted Bedfordshire Village of the Year in 2003, 2005 and 2009. It is today largely residential, but in the past it was a centre for straw plaiting. The original All Saints school was a "Straw Plait School" where children were expected to learn to plait straw from as young as four years of age. They would also be taught to read.

There was also once a small factory producing bottled drinks. Harwoods Mineral Water Factory operated from 1880 until 1947. Harwoods produced Hops Bitters, Cherry Cider, Stone Ginger Beer, Lime Juice and Soda, and Ginger Ale and sold them to the pubs and shops of all the surrounding villages.

Samuel Whitbread Academy is also located in the village of Clifton. Clifton was visited by the Queen and Prince Philip on 17 November 2006 as part of a visit to reopen the school.

Facilities in Clifton include a lower school, butcher, post office/village store and two public houses (The Golden Lion and The Admiral). There is also an Indian restaurant, garage, petrol station and a hairdresser. There is a small group of businesses located in converted farm buildings at Clifton Bury farm.

At the northern edge of the village is Clifton Cricket Club which plays at the Claybridge Ground.

Football is played at the Recreation ground. The Community Centre, with its large car park, is located at the Northern end of the Recreation Ground. All Saints' Church Hall is situated in Stanford Lane.

There is a duckpond in the centre of the village.

English actor Ben Whishaw was born and grew up in Clifton and nearby Langford.

== Geography ==
Clifton is located in the valley of the River Ivel which used to be navigable through the village. The highest point in the village is 62m above sea level at Hitchin Hill.

== Education ==
There is an academy school, Clifton All Saints.
