= Astwick =

Hamlet in Bedfordshire, England

Coordinates: 52.0319°N 0.2320°W

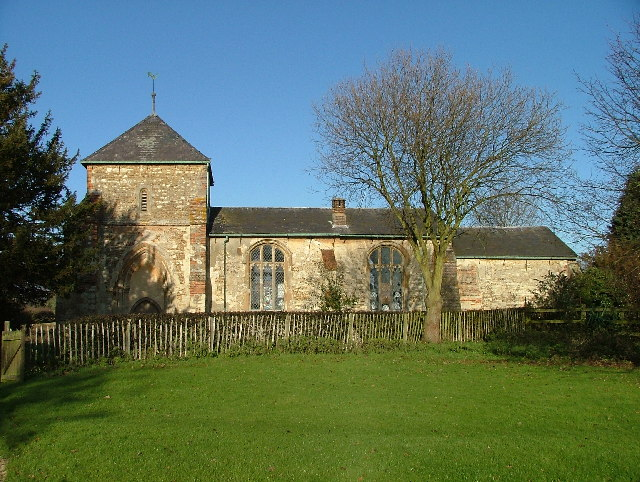
- St Guthlac's parish church

- Location within Bedfordshire
- Population: 24
- OS grid reference: TL215385
- Unitary authority: Central Bedfordshire
- Ceremonial county: Bedfordshire
- Region: East
- Country: England
- Sovereign state: United Kingdom
- Post town: HITCHIN
- Postcode district: SG5
- Dialling code: 01462
- Police: Bedfordshire
- Fire: Bedfordshire
- Ambulance: East of England

Astwick is a hamlet and civil parish in the Central Bedfordshire district of the county of Bedfordshire, England. It lies 12 1/2 miles (20 km) south-east of the county town of Bedford. Its population is included within Stotfold civil parish.

== Geography ==
Astwick is by the River Ivel just to the north of Stotfold and lies 4 miles (6 km) south of Biggleswade and 19 miles (31 km) south-west of Cambridge. The Great North Road forms the eastern parish boundary with Hertfordshire. The A1 was improved around 1958; known as the Edworth to Astwick Turn scheme. It is the first non-motorway section of dual-carriageway north of the Baldock motorway bypass.

Altitude

The hamlet is 44 metres (144 ft) above sea level. The land rises to 74 metres (243 ft) in the north of the parish towards Topler's Hill.

Geology and soil type

Land north of the main road through the hamlet is arable farmland and lies on boulder clay. To the south are pastures on largely grey and grey-blue clay but by the River Ivel is alluvium and river gravel. The north of the parish has highly fertile lime-rich loamy and clayey soils with slightly impeded drainage. There is a narrow east–west band of freely draining lime-rich loamy soils followed by loamy soils with naturally high groundwater beside the River Ivel.

The night sky and light pollution

Light pollution is the level of radiance (night lights) shining up into the night sky. The hamlet has an index of 1-2 nanoWatts (nW). This brightens to 2-4 nW alongside the A1 road but darkens to 0.5-1 nW in the western part of the parish.

== History ==
Astwick was first recorded in the Domesday Book in 1086 as Estuuiche. Its name means east farm, 'east' referring to its location on the eastern border of Bedfordshire.

Archaeologist, William Ransom unearthed an Anglo-Saxon cemetery near Astwick in 1886. Finds, including a short sword and spearheads are in the collection of the Department of Medieval and Later Antiquities at the British Museum.

The Parish Church of St Guthlac dates from the 15th-century, although there is evidence of an earlier structure on the site. The present tower was likely the central tower of a cruciform church. An unusual feature is the protruding chimney; not normally something found on a church.

Another notable building is the moated Astwick Bury, which dates from around 1700 and is Grade II listed.

Astwick Mill on the River Ivel was built in 1847 as a water-powered stone mill. It was converted to steam power in 1891 with the installation of six roller mills. In use as a corn mill until 1922, it is now a Grade II listed private residence.

== Governance ==
The parish is too small to have a parish council and instead has a parish meeting.

Astwick is part of Stotfold ward for elections to Central Bedfordshire Council. Prior to 1894, Astwick was administered as part of the Hundred of Biggleswade. From 1894 until 1974 it was in Biggleswade Rural District and from 1974 to 2009 in Mid Bedfordshire District.

For elections to the UK parliament, Astwick was in the Mid Bedfordshire constituency until 1997, in North East Bedfordshire until 2023 and is now part of Hitchin constituency.

== Economy ==
There is a high intensity poultry unit at Vine Farm. The facility, as completed in July 2016, consists of eight poultry houses with a permitted capacity of 336,000 broilers. Permission was given by the Environment Agency in October 2018 for an additional two sheds and an increase in total capacity to 442,000.

== Public services ==
Astwick is in the Potton Public Water Supply Zone (RW50). The water supplied by Anglian Water comes from groundwater boreholes and is chloraminated and classed as hard.

The Eastern Power Area of UK Power Networks is the distribution network operator for electricity. Cadent Gas owns and operates the area's gas distribution network.

The two nearest general hospitals are Bedford (Bedford Hospital NHS Trust) and Lister Hospital, Stevenage (East and North Hertfordshire NHS Trust). Ambulance services are provided by the East of England Ambulance Service NHS Trust. Bedfordshire Fire and Rescue Service and Bedfordshire Police cover the parish.

== Education ==
The majority of this community is in the catchment area for Samuel Whitbread Academy.

The nearest public library is Stotfold.
