= Chicksands =

Village in Bedfordshire, England

Coordinates: 52.037°N 0.360°W

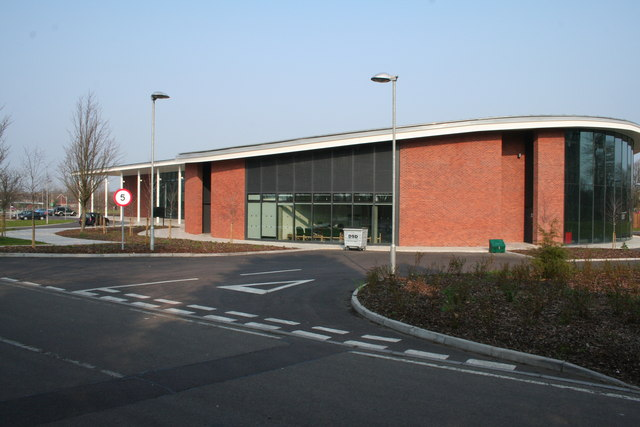
- Priory House, headquarters of Central Bedfordshire Council

- Location within Bedfordshire
- Population: 731 (Built up area, 2021)
- OS grid reference: TL124389
- Civil parish: Campton and Chicksands
- Unitary authority: Central Bedfordshire
- Ceremonial county: Bedfordshire
- Region: East
- Country: England
- Sovereign state: United Kingdom
- Post town: SHEFFORD
- Postcode district: SG17
- Dialling code: 01462
- Police: Bedfordshire
- Fire: Bedfordshire
- Ambulance: East of England
- UK Parliament: Mid Bedfordshire

Chicksands is a village in the civil parish of Campton and Chicksands in the Central Bedfordshire district of Bedfordshire, England. It gives its name to MOD Chicksands, a military base which was developed from the 1930s on the Chicksands Priory estate. The village is on the River Flit and lies immediately west of the town of Shefford. At the 2021 census the Chicksands built up area as defined by the Office for National Statistics (which excludes part of the MOD Chicksands base) had a population of 731. The wider parish of Campton and Chicksands, which also includes the village of Campton, had a population of 1,895.

== History ==
Chicksands appears in the Domesday Book of 1086, where it is listed under the variations Chichesana and Chichesane. William de Cairon was then the tenant of the Bishop of Lincoln, along with three freemen and Walter, holding from Azelina, wife of Ralph Tailbois, as part of her dowry. The place-name itself derives from Old English, meaning “Cicca’s sands,” with Cicca being a personal name and sands referring to the sandy soil of the district.

One of the most significant landmarks in the area is Chicksands Priory, founded around 1150. The priory was established for the Gilbertine Order, the only monastic order of English origin. Following the Dissolution of the Monasteries in the 16th century, the priory passed into private hands and was later adapted as a country residence. English Heritage notes that the priory's architecture retains important 12th-century features alongside later Tudor and Jacobean additions, making it one of the best surviving Gilbertine houses in the country. Today, the priory is located within the grounds of the Defence Intelligence Academy (DefIntAc), but it remains accessible to the public by appointment, typically on the first and third Sundays between April and October.

Chicksands entered a new chapter in its history during the Second World War, becoming the site of RAF Chicksands, an important Royal Air Force station. From 1939, the base was used for signals intelligence operations, with Y-Service units intercepting enemy communications. According to the National Archives, RAF Chicksands played a key role in the wartime codebreaking network that supplied intelligence to Bletchley Park.

After the war, the site was transferred to the United States Air Force (USAF) under post-war defence agreements. From 1950 until 1995, Chicksands was a key American base in Europe. In 1963, the USAF installed one of its first FLR-9 Wullenweber antenna arrays, a massive circular structure known informally as the “Elephant Cage.” Standing nearly 1,500 feet in diameter, the antenna was designed for high-frequency direction-finding during the Cold War. RAF and Forces sources describe it as a technological marvel of its time, although it was dismantled shortly before the USAF's withdrawal in 1995.

=== Modern use ===
Following the departure of American forces, Chicksands was repurposed for British military use. It is now home to the Defence Intelligence Academy and serves as the headquarters of the British Army's Intelligence Corps (UK Ministry of Defence, 2021). The site continues to play an important role in preparing personnel for intelligence, cyber, and signals operations in modern defence contexts.

Mid Bedfordshire District Council moved to a new office building on part of the former RAF Chicksands sportsfield, adjacent to the A507, having previously been based in offices at Ampthill and Biggleswade. The new office, named Priory House, was officially opened by the Queen on 17 November 2006 accompanied by the Duke of Edinburgh. The offices are now home to Central Bedfordshire Council.

== Governance ==
There are two tiers of local government covering Chicksands, at parish and unitary authority level: Campton and Chicksands Parish Council and Central Bedfordshire Council. The parish council generally meets at Campton Village Hall. Central Bedfordshire Council has its headquarters at Priory House on Monks Walk in Chicksands.

=== Administrative history ===
Chicksands was historically an extra-parochial area, outside any parish. Such areas were made civil parishes in 1858. In 1985 the civil parish of Chicksands was merged with the neighbouring parish of Campton to become a new parish called Campton and Chicksands. At the 1981 census (the last before the abolition of the parish), Chicksands had a population of 994.

== Education ==
It is in the school catchment area for Robert Bloomfield Academy. It is also in the catchment area for Samuel Whitbread Academy, which has an upper school and sixth form.
