= William Ransom =

William Ransom (January 28, 1826 in Hitchin – 1914) was a British botanist, pharmacist, archaeologist and pharmaceutical company founder. He was a Quaker and owned a pharmacy in the center of Hitchin where he lived all his life.

Several places in Hitchin bear his name, notably the physic garden near the library and William Ransom Primary School.
