= Shefford, Bedfordshire =

Market town in Bedfordshire, England

Coordinates: 52.037°N 0.332°W

Shefford
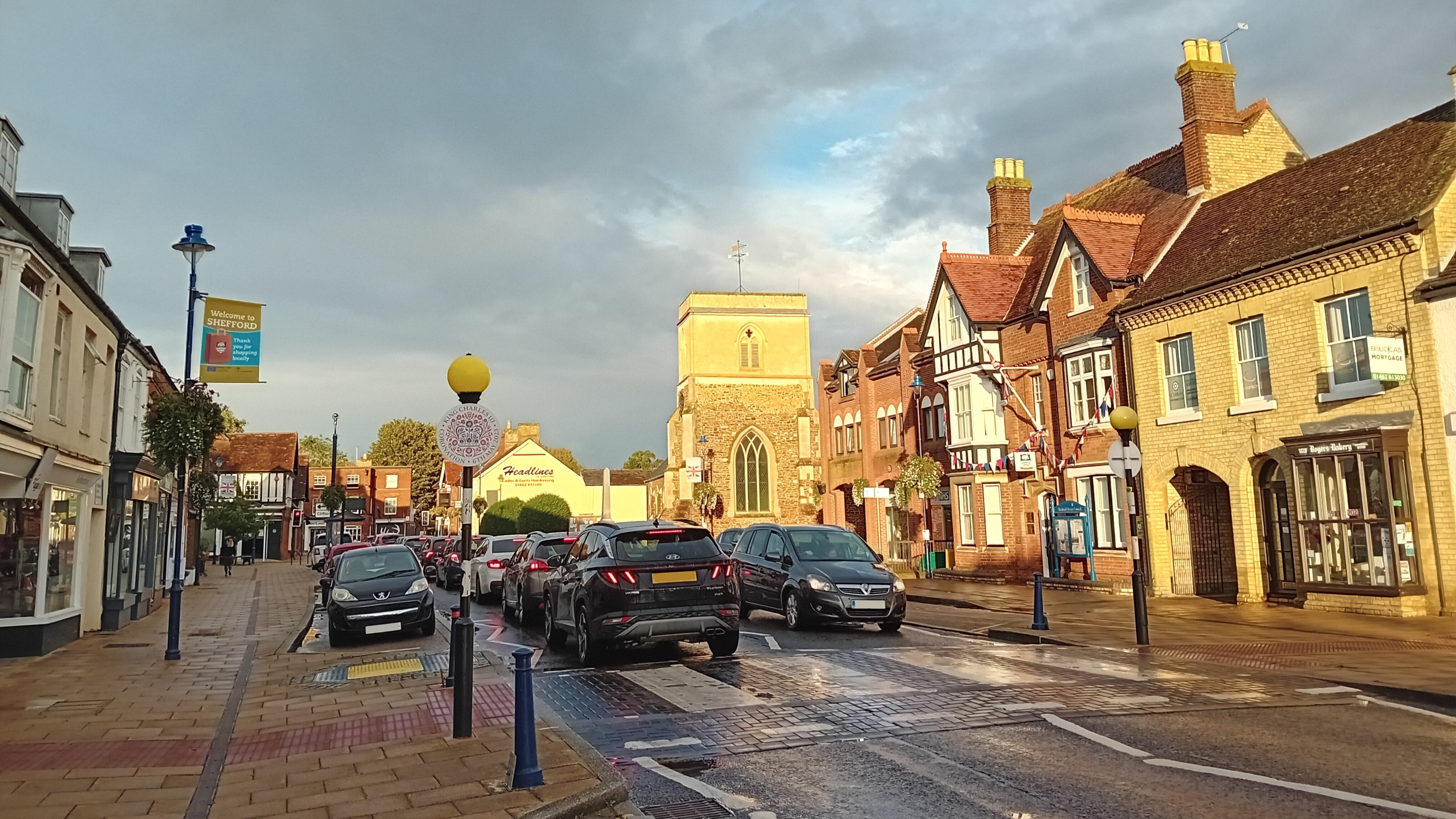
- Shefford High Street

- Location within Bedfordshire
- Population: 7,311 (Parish, 2021)
- Civil parish: Shefford
- Unitary authority: Central Bedfordshire
- Ceremonial county: Bedfordshire
- Region: East
- Country: England
- Sovereign state: United Kingdom
- Post town: Shefford
- Postcode district: SG17
- Dialling code: 01462
- Police: Bedfordshire
- Fire: Bedfordshire
- Ambulance: East of England
- UK Parliament: Hitchin

Shefford is a town and civil parish in the Central Bedfordshire district of Bedfordshire, England. At the 2021 census it had a population of 7,311. It lies 10 miles (16 km) south-east of Bedford.

== Toponymy ==
The name Shefford means "sheep ford", referencing the fords over the River Flit and River Hit. The name was recorded as "Shipford" in 1229, with the modern spelling being recorded from as early as 1262.

The town gives its name to Shefford, Quebec.

== History ==
Roman remains were discovered in Shefford in the early nineteenth century.

Shefford grew up between a pair of fords on the main road from Bedford to Hitchin where it crosses the River Flit and River Hit. Another road leading west from that main road, heading towards Ampthill, became the town's High Street. Both fords were later replaced by bridges; North Bridge over the Flit and South Bridge over the Hit. A market was being held at Shefford by 1225, with a formal market charter being issued in 1229. In 1312, another Royal charter granted Shefford the right to hold an annual fair. This was held at Michaelmas, and although at least two more fairs were established in the town at later dates, only this one, held as a street fair on October the 11th each year, remains today. By the fifteenth century the church of St Michael and All Angels had been built at the eastern end of the High Street near the junction with Southbridge Street, originally serving as a chapel of ease to Campton.

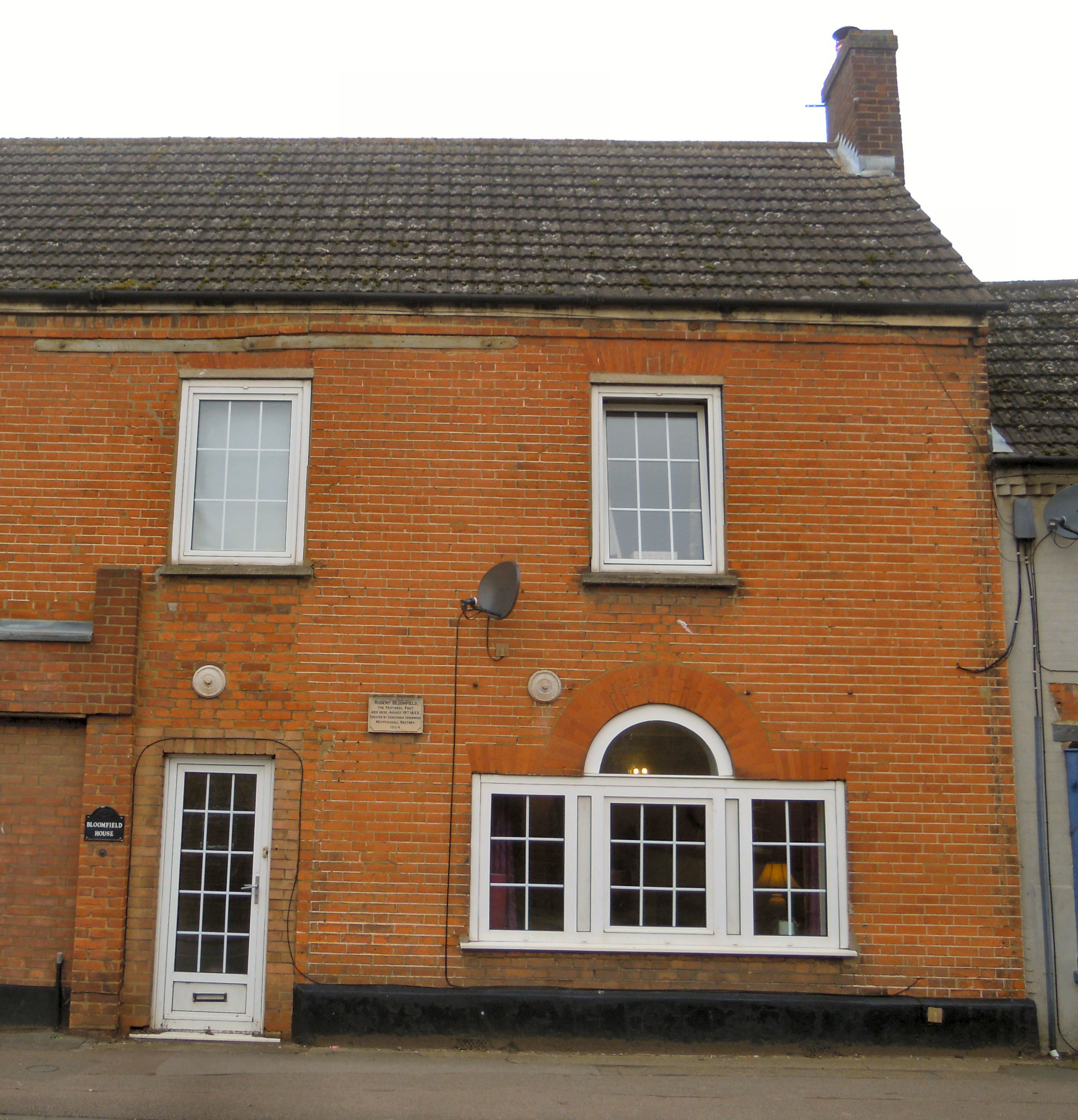
The cottage where the poet Robert Bloomfield died in 1823

The working class poet Robert Bloomfield lived in Shefford from 1812 until his death there in 1823. One of the town's schools is named after him.

The Ivel Navigation was extended to reach the town in 1823, with the extension also being known as the Shefford Canal. It closed to traffic in 1876 following growing competition from the railways. The Midland Railway opened Shefford railway station in 1857 on its original main line to London. The route was downgraded to become the Bedford to Hitchin branch line following the opening of a new main line in 1868. It closed to passengers in 1961 and freight in 1964.

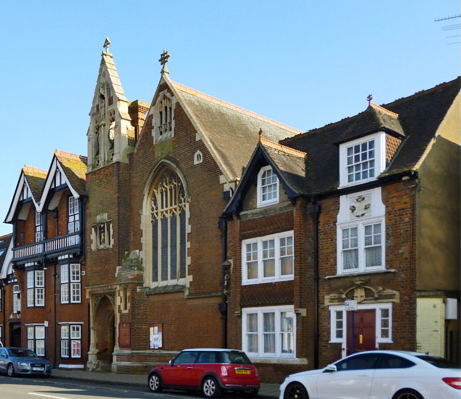
St Francis' Catholic Church and adjoining former orphanage buildings.

Between 1869 and 1974 Shefford was the site of an orphanage called St Francis' Boy's Home run by the Roman Catholic Church. It was situated on High Street next to the Catholic St Francis of Assisi Church. The church remains in use as a place of worship. The orphanage buildings have been converted into flats.

During World War II an entire Jewish children's community came into being in Shefford as 500 pupils from Judith Grunfeld's school were billeted in and around the town. The school was moved in 1939 and remained in Shefford until 1945. This was part of "Operation Pied Piper" where schools were moved in anticipation of wartime bombing. A book was written about this time, titled "Shefford: The Story of a Jewish School Community in Evacuation, 1939-1945", telling the story of the evacuated school.

== Geography ==
The River Flit and the River Hit run through the town. The River Flit rises as a small pool beneath Carters Hill, a few metres to the east of the M1 motorway and just to the east of the village of Chalton. The River Hit runs from Standalone Farm Hill to make the flow as seen in Shefford today but flows from the Baldock area in smaller flows. The Hit and the Flit meet just a short way down the path from the Northbridge Street river bridge to form the historic Ivel Navigation. The River Ivel joins the River Great Ouse at Tempsford.

== Governance ==
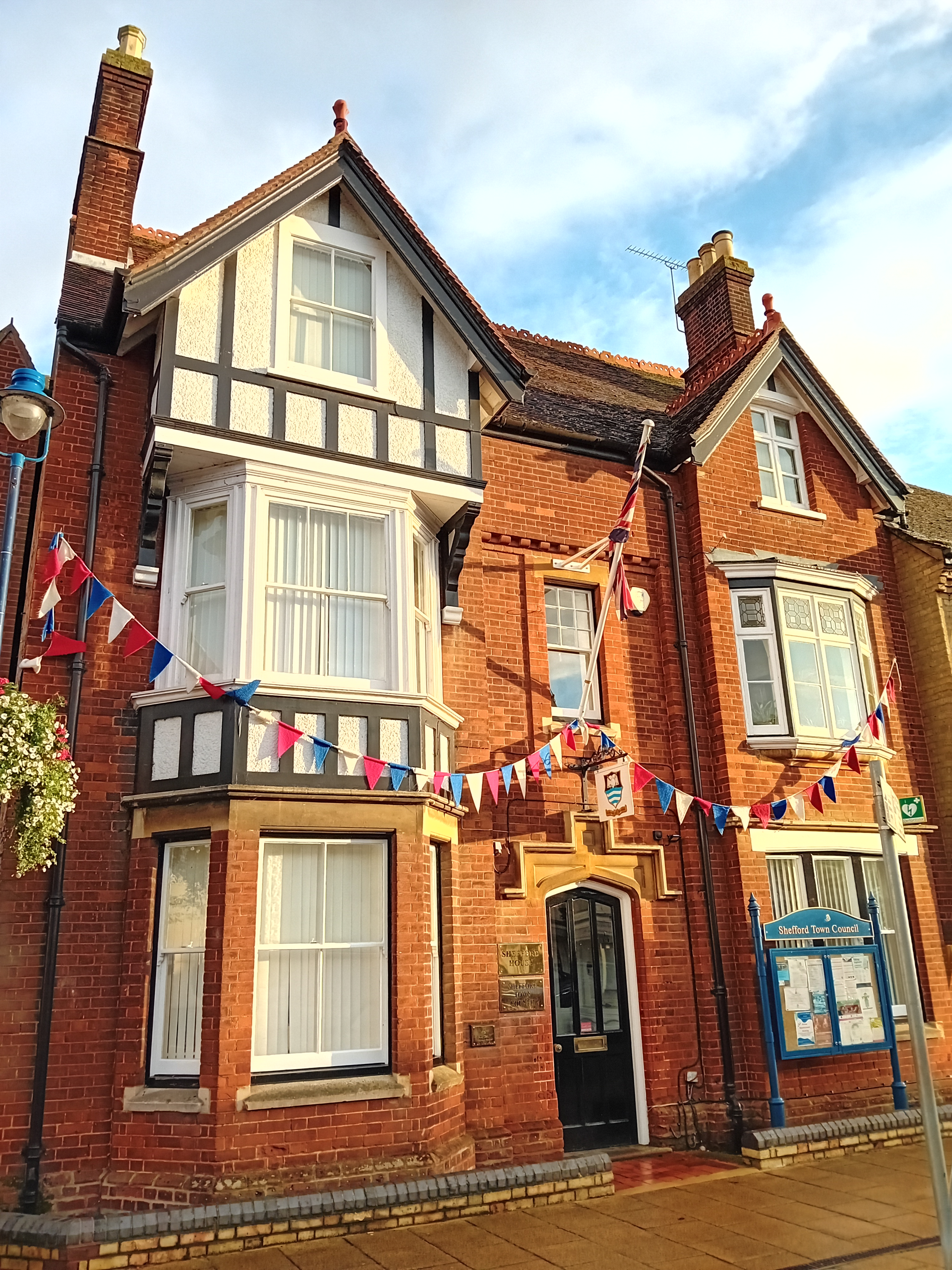
Shefford House, 15 High Street: Offices of Shefford Town Council.

There are two tiers of local government covering Shefford, at civil parish (town) and unitary authority level: Shefford Town Council and Central Bedfordshire Council. The town council is based at Shefford House at 15 High Street. Central Bedfordshire Council has its main offices at Priory House in Chicksands, immediately west of Shefford.

Shefford was historically a chapelry and township in the ancient parish of Campton. It became a separate civil parish in 1866. It remained part of the ecclesiastical parish of Campton until 1903.

Shefford Hardwick was an extra-parochial area north-west of Shefford. Such extra-parochial areas were made civil parishes in 1858. The parish of Shefford Hardwick was subsequently abolished in 1933 and absorbed into Shefford, which also gained territory from the neighbouring parishes of Southill, Clifton, Meppershall and Campton at the same time.

== Facilities ==
Morrisons and Co-op supermarkets are in the town centre and a Tesco store is attached to the Esso Petrol Station on the outskirts. There are many public houses, the Banks and Taylor micro brewery (est. 1982) and Chinese, Indian and Turkish takeaways and restaurants, and a fish and chip shop. Shefford has two petrol stations, two car dealers, and two pharmacies. There are three estate agents, a newsagent, a convenience store, a charity shop, an angling centre, a bakery, a tea room, a wine bar, a Post Office with sorting facilities and an ironmonger/building supply centre.

Community institutions include a fire station, bowls club, sports club, Memorial Hall and Community Hall. A public library is on High Street.

There are four Churches - Anglican, Baptist, Methodist and Roman Catholic. Several schools and nurseries, and a large medical practice.

The town has a scout group, Guiding Groups and a local Army Cadet Force hut at Chicksands on the Army Intelligence Corps base, which is part of Bedfordshire and Hertfordshire ACF, in 4 Company.

== Transport ==
Shefford railway station was on the Bedford–Hitchin line but closed to passengers in 1961 and to freight in 1964; its goods yard is now the site of an industrial estate. Current public transport provision consists of hourly buses 9A and 9B between Bedford and Hitchin, operated by Stagecoach East and promoted by Intalink.

== Media ==
Local news and television programmes are provided by BBC East and ITV Anglia. Television signals are received from the Sandy Heath TV transmitter. Local radio stations are BBC Three Counties Radio on 95.5 FM, Heart East on 96.9 FM, and Bedford Radio, a community based radio station which broadcast online. The town is served by the local newspapers, Bedford Today (formerly Times & Citizen) and The Biggleswade Chronicle.

== Education ==
Shefford is served by secondary school Samuel Whitbread Academy in the nearby village of Clifton, middle school Robert Bloomfield Academy, Shefford Lower School, Shefford Nursery, BEST nursery and Acorn Pre-School & The Mighty Oaks.

== Sport and leisure ==
Shefford has a non-League football club, Shefford Town & Campton F.C. and boys and girls football teams at Shefford Saints Juniors FC. Both clubs play home matches at Shefford Sports Club on Hitchin Road. Wales and West Ham footballer, Jack Collison played for Shefford Saints and grew up in Shefford.

A modern, concrete skatepark is at Lovelace Meadow.
