= SG postcode area =

Postcode area within the United Kingdom

Stevenage
- Postcode area
- Coordinates: 51.950°N 0.158°W
- Country: United Kingdom
- Postcode area: SG
- Postcode area name: Stevenage
- Post towns: 15
- Postcode districts: 19
- Postcode sectors: 65
- Postcodes (live): 11,823
- Postcodes (total): 16,831
- Statistics as at May 2020

The SG postcode area, also known as the Stevenage postcode area, is a group of nineteen postcode districts in England, within fifteen post towns. These cover most of eastern Hertfordshire (including Stevenage, Baldock, Buntingford, Hertford, Hitchin, Knebworth, Letchworth, Much Hadham, Royston and Ware) and east Bedfordshire (including Arlesey, Biggleswade, Henlow, Sandy and Shefford), plus a small part of south-west Cambridgeshire and a very small part of Essex.

== Coverage ==
The approximate coverage of the postcode districts:

Postcode district	Post town	Coverage	Local authority area(s)
SG1	STEVENAGE	North Stevenage including Old Town and Town Centre, Great Ashby	Stevenage, North Hertfordshire
SG2	STEVENAGE	South Stevenage, Bragbury End, Walkern, Ardeley	Stevenage, East Hertfordshire
SG3	KNEBWORTH	Knebworth, Datchworth, Woolmer Green	North Hertfordshire, East Hertfordshire, Welwyn Hatfield
SG4	HITCHIN	Hitchin (east), Codicote, Kimpton, Weston, St Ippolyts, Little Wymondley, Whitwell, Graveley, Great Wymondley, Breachwood Green, Gosmore, Preston, St Paul's Walden, Langley, Bendish, Ley Green, King's Walden, Hall's Green	North Hertfordshire
SG5	HITCHIN	Hitchin (west), Stotfold, Ickleford, Shillington, Offley, Fairfield, Pirton, Holwell, Apsley End, Hexton, Charlton, Astwick, Pegsdon, Higham Gobion	North Hertfordshire, Central Bedfordshire
SG6	HITCHIN		non-geographic
SG6	LETCHWORTH GARDEN CITY	Letchworth, Norton, Willian	North Hertfordshire
SG7	BALDOCK	Baldock, Ashwell, Hinxworth, Wallington, Newnham, Bygrave, Radwell, Clothall, Odsey, Caldecote	North Hertfordshire, South Cambridgeshire
SG8	ROYSTON	Royston, Abington Pigotts, Arrington, Barkway, Barley, Bassingbourn, Chrishall, Croydon, Fowlmere, Great Chishill, Guilden Morden, Heydon, Kelshall, Kneesworth, Litlington, Little Chishill, Melbourn, Meldreth, New Wimpole, Nuthampstead, Orwell, Reed, Shepreth, Shingay, Steeple Morden, Tadlow, Therfield, Thriplow, Wendy, Whaddon	North Hertfordshire, South Cambridgeshire, Uttlesford
SG9	BUNTINGFORD	Buntingford, Cottered, Great Hormead, Furneux Pelham, Brent Pelham, Stocking Pelham, Hare Street, Anstey, Westmill, Wyddial, Buckland, Aspenden, Chipping, Sandon, Rushden, Throcking, Meesden, Little Hormead	East Hertfordshire, North Hertfordshire
SG10	MUCH HADHAM	Much Hadham, Perry Green	East Hertfordshire
SG11	WARE	Albury, Braughing, Bury Green, Colliers End, Haultwick, High Cross, Little Hadham, Nasty, Patmore Heath, Puckeridge, Standon, Standon Green End	East Hertfordshire
SG12	WARE	Ware, Great Amwell, Stanstead Abbotts, Stanstead St Margarets, Widford, Hunsdon, Thundridge, Wadesmill, Dane End, Tonwell, Chapmore End, Wareside, Babbs Green, Sacombe	East Hertfordshire
SG13	HERTFORD	Hertford (south and east), Newgate Street Village, Bayford, Brickendon	East Hertfordshire, Welwyn Hatfield
SG14	HERTFORD	Hertford (north, west and town centre), Watton-at-Stone, Bramfield, Waterford	East Hertfordshire
SG15	ARLESEY	Arlesey	Central Bedfordshire
SG16	HENLOW	Henlow, Henlow Camp, Lower Stondon, Upper Stondon	Central Bedfordshire
SG17	SHEFFORD	Shefford, Clifton, Meppershall, Campton, Chicksands, Beadlow, Deadman's Cross	Central Bedfordshire
SG18	BIGGLESWADE	Biggleswade, Langford, Lower Caldecote, Northill, Upper Caldecote	Central Bedfordshire
SG19	SANDY	Sandy, Potton, Gamlingay, Great Gransden, Wrestlingworth, Tempsford, Everton, Waresley, Little Gransden, Sutton, Beeston, Hatley, Eyeworth, Cockayne Hatley, Hatch, Thorncote Green, Budna	Central Bedfordshire, South Cambridgeshire, Huntingdonshire

== Map ==
SG postcode area map, showing postcode districts in red and post towns in grey text, with links to nearby AL, CB, CM, EN, LU, MK and PE postcode areas.

== See also ==
- Postcode Address File
- List of postcode areas in the United Kingdom
