= Henlow =

Village in Bedfordshire, England

Coordinates: 52.03245°N 0.28714°W

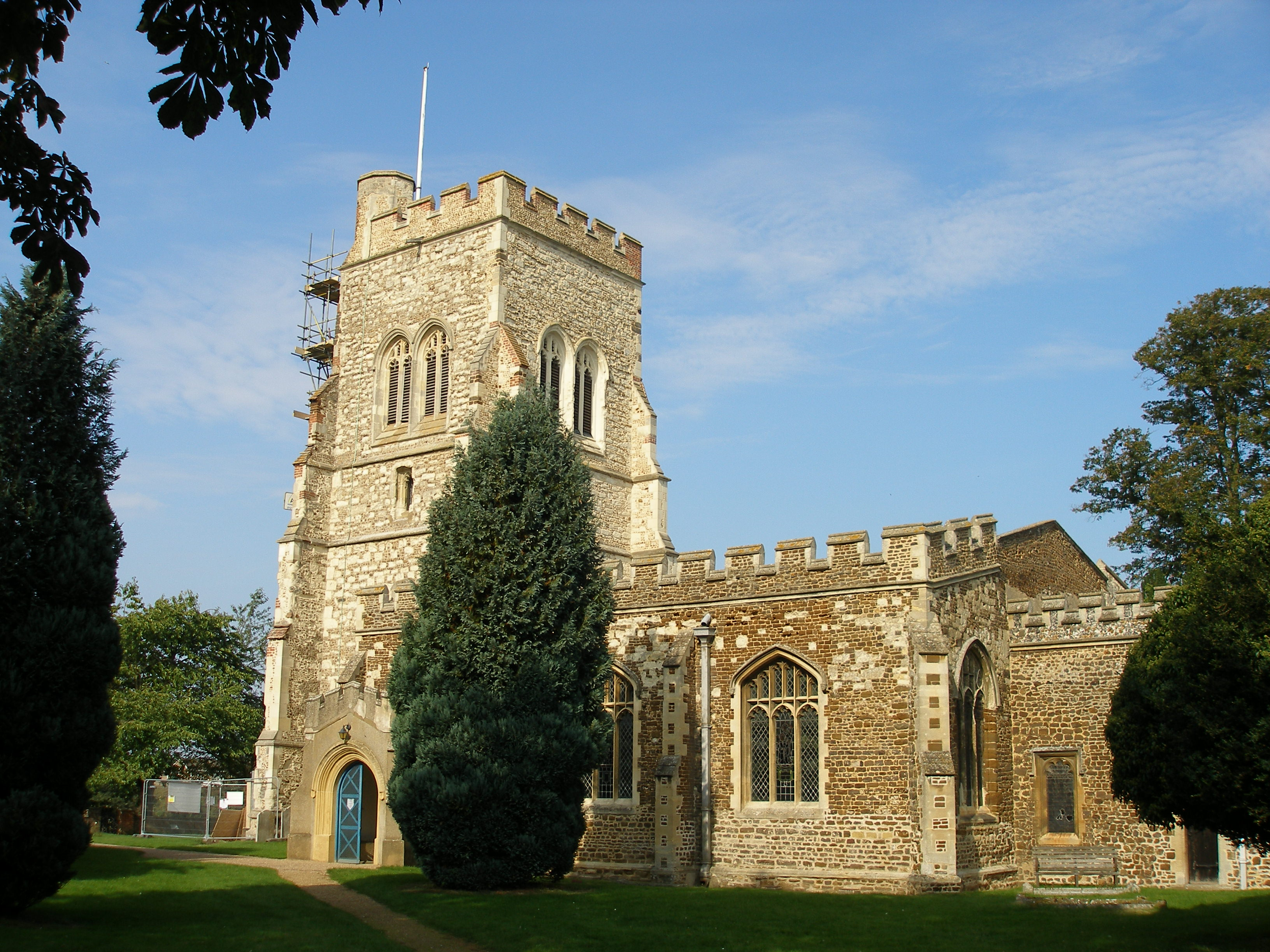
- Parish church of St Mary

- Location within Bedfordshire
- Population: 2,253 (Henlow village); 3,815 (Parish) (2011 Census)
- OS grid reference: TL176385
- Unitary authority: Central Bedfordshire
- Ceremonial county: Bedfordshire
- Region: East
- Country: England
- Sovereign state: United Kingdom
- Post town: HENLOW
- Postcode district: SG16
- Dialling code: 01462
- Police: Bedfordshire
- Fire: Bedfordshire
- Ambulance: East of England
- UK Parliament: Hitchin

Henlow is a village and civil parish in the Central Bedfordshire district of the county of Bedfordshire, England, about 11 miles (18 km) south-east of the county town of Bedford. The name Henlow is believed to derive from the old English henna hlaw, meaning in old English "hill of birds" or “hill frequented by birds”.

At the 2011 census, the population of the village was 2,253, and 3,815 for the parish. Since 2023, Henlow has been in the parliamentary constituency of Hitchin.

== Village ==
Henlow is mentioned (with a degree of dispute recorded) in the Domesday Book. The entry reads: Haneslau(ue)/Hanslau(e): Herfast from Nigel d'Aubigny; Hugh from Walter of Flanders; Widder and Bernard from Azelina, Ralph Tailbois' wife (Hugh de Beauchamp claims from her, stating it was never in her dowry); Alric. 2 mills.

The parish includes RAF Henlow and that part of Henlow Camp situated east of the A600 road. While RAF Henlow is located near Henlow, it is nearer to the village of Stondon. The civilian settlement of Henlow Camp has grown up near to the RAF station.

There is a health farm in Henlow at Henlow Grange, part of the Champneys group. The parish church, Grade I listed, and parts of which are from the 12th century, is dedicated to St Mary the Virgin.

The Henlow greyhound racing track closed permanently on 21 January 2024.

== Education ==
It is in the catchment zone for Samuel Whitbread Academy, which has an upper school and sixth form.

== Sport and recreation ==
Henlow is home to Henlow Hurricanes FC. The club takes its name from the Hawker Hurricane which was assembled at nearby RAF Henlow during WWII.
