= Central Bedfordshire =

Unitary authority area in Bedfordshire, England

- Local government district
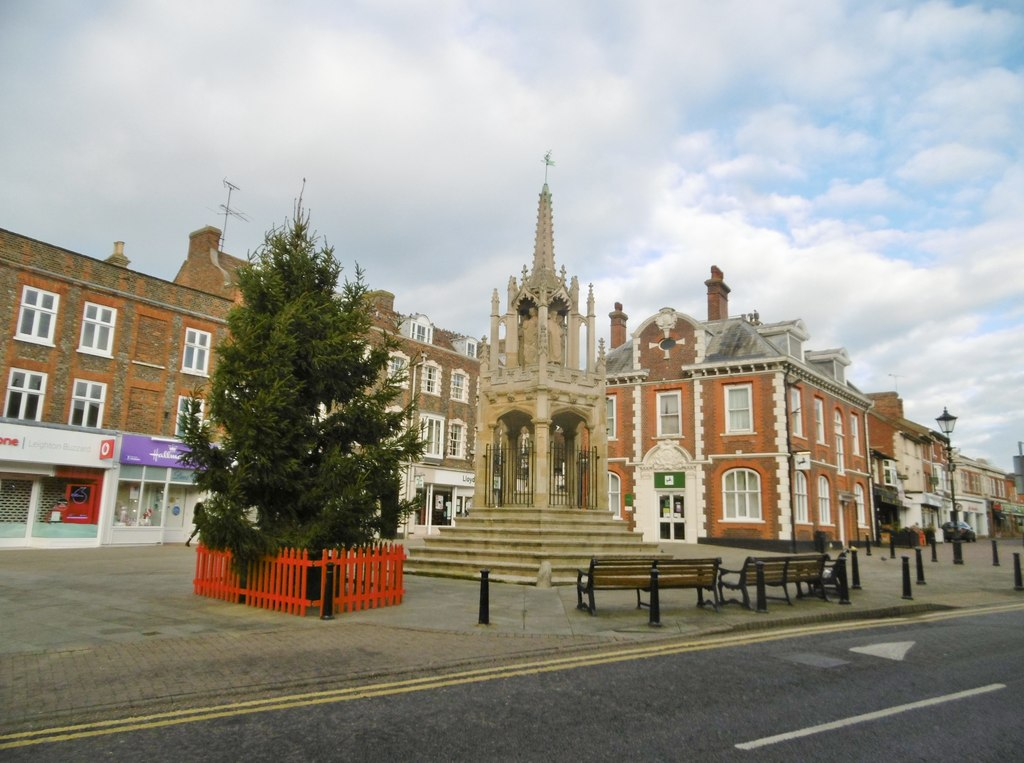
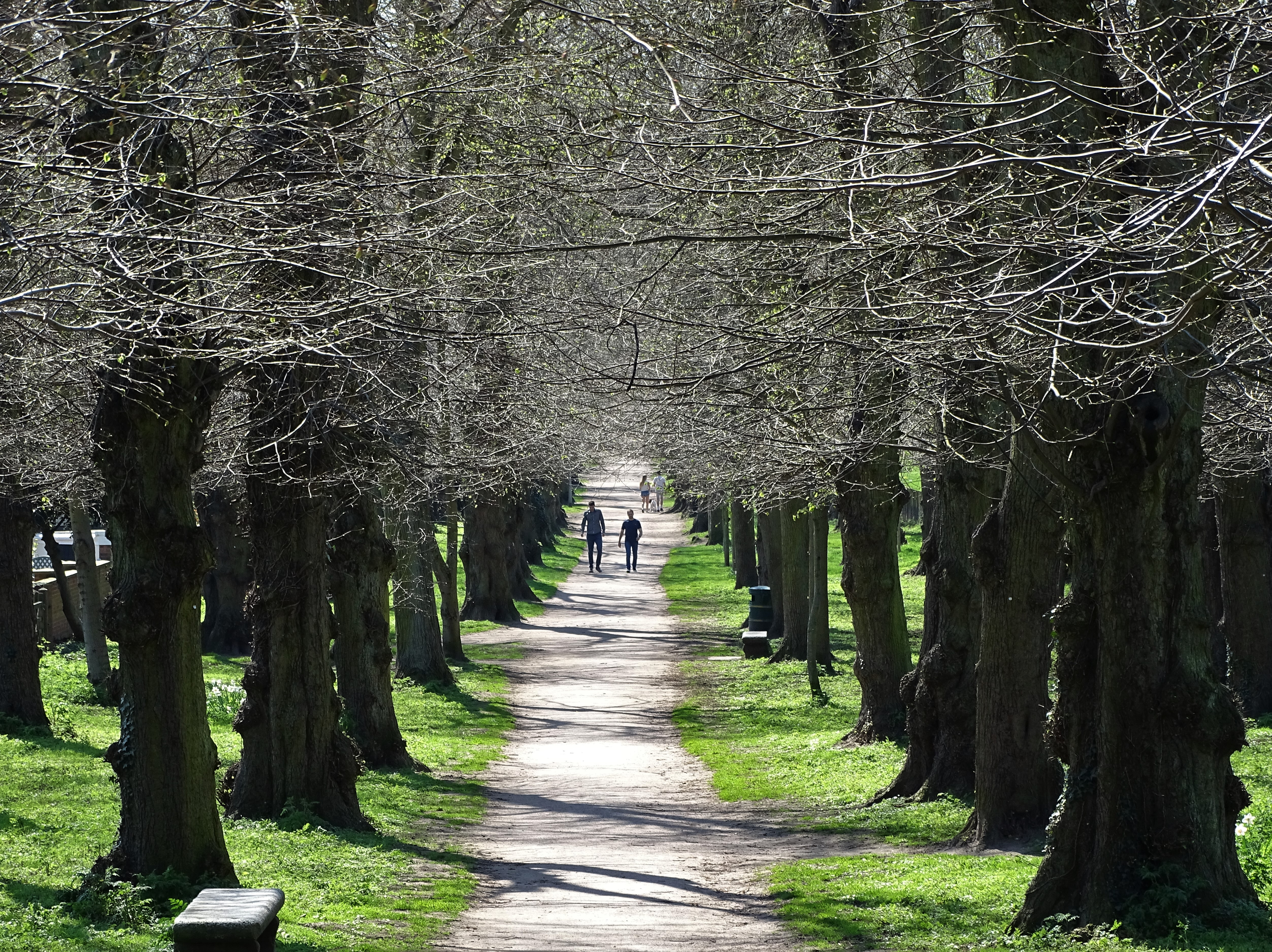
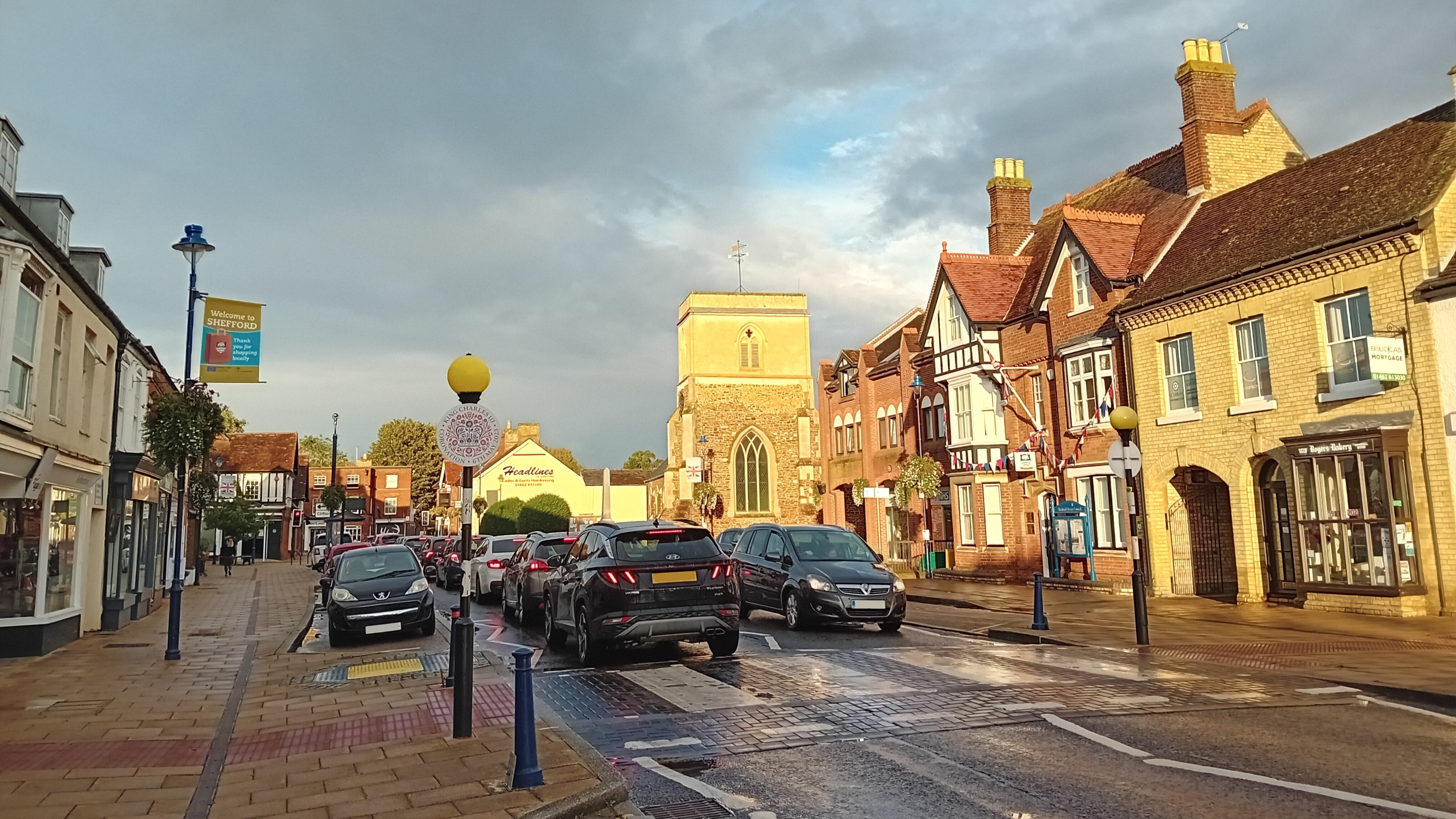
- Top: Leighton Buzzard Market Cross; Bottom: Alameda in Ampthill and Shefford High Street.

- Shown within Bedfordshire
- Sovereign state: United Kingdom
- Constituent country: England
- Region: East of England
- Ceremonial county: Bedfordshire
- Founded: 1 April 2009
- Admin. HQ: Chicksands

Government
  - Type: Unitary authority
  - Body: Central Bedfordshire Council
  - Leadership: Leader & Cabinet
  - Executive: No overall control
  - MPs: Richard Fuller (C); Rachel Hopkins (L); Alex Mayer (L); Alistair Strathern (L); Blake Stephenson (C)

Area
  - Total: 276 sq mi (716 km^{2})
  - Rank: 45th

Population (2024)
  - Total: 315,877
  - Rank: Ranked 46th
  - Density: 1,140/sq mi (441/km^{2})

Ethnicity (2021)
  - Ethnic groups: List: 90.2% White; 3.5% Asian; 3% Mixed; 2.4% Black; 0.8% other

Religion (2021)
  - Religion: List: 47.9% Christianity; 42.8% no religion; 8% other; 1.3% Islam
- Time zone: UTC+0 (Greenwich Mean Time)
  - Summer (DST): UTC+1 (British Summer Time)
- ISO 3166-2: GB-CBF
- ONS code: 00KC (ONS); E06000056 (GSS)
- Website: centralbedfordshire.gov.uk

Central Bedfordshire is a local government district in the ceremonial county of Bedfordshire, England. It is administered by Central Bedfordshire Council, a unitary authority. It was created in 2009.

== Formation ==
Central Bedfordshire was created on 1 April 2009 as part of a structural reform of local government in Bedfordshire. Bedfordshire County Council and all the district councils in the county were abolished and replaced by unitary authorities. The unitary authorities provide the services previously delivered by the district and county councils. Central Bedfordshire covers the area of the former Mid Bedfordshire and South Bedfordshire Districts.

The local authority is called Central Bedfordshire Council.

== Parliamentary representation ==
Following the 2023 review of Westminster constituencies, Central Bedfordshire would be split between five parliamentary constituencies:

- Dunstable and Leighton Buzzard (entirety)
- Hitchin (part also in the District of North Hertfordshire)
- Luton South and South Bedfordshire (part)
- Mid Bedfordshire (part)
- North Bedfordshire (part)

== Towns and villages ==
Map of wards within Central Bedfordshire

Central Bedfordshire comprises a mix of market towns and rural villages. The largest town is Leighton Buzzard followed by Dunstable and Houghton Regis. Dunstable and Houghton Regis form part of the Luton/Dunstable urban area. Central Bedfordshire includes the following towns and villages.

- Ampthill (town)
- Arlesey (town)
- Aspley Guise
- Barton-le-Clay
- Biggleswade (town)
- Blunham
- Broom
- Caddington
- Campton
- Clifton
- Clophill
- Chalton
- Chicksands
- Cranfield
- Dunstable (town)
- Dunton
- Eaton Bray
- Eversholt
- Fairfield
- Flitton
- Flitwick (town)
- Greenfield
- Harlington
- Haynes
- Heath and Reach
- Henlow
- Higham Gobion
- Houghton Conquest
- Houghton Regis (town)
- Husborne Crawley
- Kensworth
- Langford
- Leighton Buzzard (town)
- Lidlington
- Linslade (town)
- Marston Moretaine
- Maulden
- Meppershall
- Millbrook
- Northill
- Old Warden
- Pepperstock
- Potton (town)
- Pulloxhill
- Ridgmont
- Sandy (town)
- Shefford (town)
- Silsoe
- Shillington
- Slip End
- Southill
- Stanford
- Steppingley
- Stotfold (town)
- Sutton
- Tebworth
- Tempsford
- Toddington
- Westoning
- Wingfield
- Wixams (new town, partly in Central Bedfordshire and partly in the Borough of Bedford)
- Woburn
- Woodside

== See also ==
- List of places in Bedfordshire
