= Central Bedfordshire Council elections =

UK council elections

Central Bedfordshire Council is the local authority for the a unitary authority of Central Bedfordshire in Bedfordshire, England. It was created on 1 April 2009 replacing Mid Bedfordshire, South Bedfordshire and Bedfordshire County Council.

== Council elections ==
Composition of the council
Year	Conservative	Labour	Liberal Democrats (Note: Includes totals for the predecessors of the Liberal Democrats, the Liberal Party and SDP (both of which participated in the Alliance).)	Green (Note: Includes totals for the predecessors of the Green Party of England and Wales, the Ecology Party and Green Party UK.)	UKIP	Independents & Others	Council control after election
Council created from the merger of Mid Bedfordshire and South Bedfordshire (66 seats)
2009	54	0	11	0	0	1	Conservative
New ward boundaries (59 seats)
2011	49	1	5	0	0	4	Conservative
2015	53	2	1	0	0	3	Conservative
2019	41	1	3	0	1	13	Conservative
New ward boundaries (63 seats)
2023	20	5	10	1	0	27	No overall control

== District result maps ==
2009 results map

2011 results map

2015 results map

2019 results map

2023 results map

== By-election results ==
=== 2011-2015 ===
Stotfold and Langford By-Election 16 August 2012
Party	Candidate	Votes	%	±%
Conservative	Gillian Clarke	1,021	55.6	+10.1
Labour	Satinderjit Singh Dhaliwal	446	24.3	+8.8
UKIP	George Konstantinidis	221	12.0	+12.0
Liberal Democrats	Anthony Baines	147	8.0	−7.5
Majority		575	31.3	
Turnout		1,835		
Conservative hold		Swing		

Biggleswade South By-Election 15 November 2012
Party	Candidate	Votes	%	±%
Conservative	Tim Woodward	642	38.3	−21.2
Labour	Sheila Grayston	523	31.2	−9.3
Independent	Jonathan Medlock	437	26.1	+26.1
Liberal Democrats	Gee Leach	73	4.4	+4.4
Majority		119	7.1	
Turnout		1,675		
Conservative hold		Swing		

Silsoe and Shillington By-Election 15 November 2012
Party	Candidate	Votes	%	±%
Independent	Alison Graham	527	55.0	+55.0
Conservative	Martin Hawkins	236	24.6	−21.6
UKIP	Steven Wildman	73	7.6	+7.6
Liberal Democrats	Janet Nunn	66	6.9	−34.0
Green	Gareth Ellis	56	5.8	−0.7
Majority		291	30.4	
Turnout		958		
Independent gain from Conservative		Swing		

Alison Graham contested the ward as a Liberal Democrat in 2011, receiving 40.9%.

Dunstable-Northfields By-Election 12 September 2013
Party	Candidate	Votes	%	±%
Independent	Bev Coleman	434	33.4	+33.4
Conservative	Jeanette Freeman	305	23.5	−7.8
Labour	Duncan Ross	297	22.9	−2.6
UKIP	Garry Lelliott	227	17.5	+17.5
Liberal Democrats	Lynda Walmsley	35	2.7	−4.2
Majority		129	9.9	
Turnout		1,298		
Independent gain from Conservative		Swing		

Caddington By-Election 28 November 2013
Party	Candidate	Votes	%	±%
Conservative	Kevin Collins	738	39.6	−26.9
Independent	Christine Smith	560	30.0	+30.0
UKIP	Steven Wildman	334	17.9	+17.9
Labour	Ian Lowery	209	11.2	−10.2
Liberal Democrats	Alan Winter	24	1.3	−10.8
Majority		178	9.5	
Turnout		1,865		
Conservative hold		Swing		

=== 2015-2019 ===
Biggleswade North By-Election 4 May 2017
Party	Candidate	Votes	%	±%
Conservative	Steven Watkins	704	35.1	−5.5
Independent	Bernard Rix	541	27.0	+27.0
Labour	Bernard Briars	387	19.3	−5.6
UKIP	Duncan Strachan	158	7.9	−15.7
Green	Amy Peabody	134	6.7	−4.3
Liberal Democrats	Nigel Aldis	81	4.0	+4.0
Majority		163	8.1	
Turnout		2,005		
Conservative hold		Swing		

Shefford By-Election 4 May 2017
Party	Candidate	Votes	%	±%
Conservative	Mark Liddiard	1,325	54.4	−0.9
Liberal Democrats	Annabel Woolmer	499	20.5	+20.5
Labour	David Short	345	14.2	−9.6
UKIP	Roger Smith	267	11.0	−9.9
Majority		826	33.9	
Turnout		2,436		
Conservative hold		Swing		

=== 2023-2027 ===
Stotfold By-Election 11 September 2025
Party	Candidate	Votes	%	±%
Reform	Marion Mason	823	30.8	+30.8
Conservative	Ian Dalgarno	559	20.9	+1.3
Labour	Rachel Burgin	532	19.9	−4.2
Green	Kate Hill-Lines	416	15.6	+15.6
Liberal Democrats	Neil Stevenson	339	12.7	+0.2
Majority		264	9.9	
Turnout		2,669		
Reform gain from Labour		Swing		
