= 2011 Central Bedfordshire Council election =

2011 UK local government election

| ← 2009 | 5 May 2011 | 2015 → |

All 59 seats to Central Bedfordshire Council 30 seats needed for a majority

| | First party | Second party |
|---|---|---|
| Party | Conservative | Liberal Democrats |
| Last election | 54 seats, 51.7% | 11 seats, 29.0% |
| Seats won | 49 | 5 |
| Seat change | ▼5 | ▼6 |
| Popular vote | 86,017 | 23,040 |
| Percentage | 53.6% | 14.4% |
| Swing | ▲1.9% | ▼14.6% |
| | Third party | Fourth party |
| Party | Independent | Labour |
| Last election | 1 seat, 4.1% | 0 seats, 12.0% |
| Seats won | 4 | 1 |
| Seat change | ▲3 | ▲1 |
| Popular vote | 12,922 | 35,668 |
| Percentage | 8.1% | 22.2% |
| Swing | ▲4.0% | ▲12.2% |
- Winner of each seat at the 2011 Central Bedfordshire Council election
Council control before election
Conservative
Council control after election
Conservative

The 2011 Central Bedfordshire Council electionfor the Central Bedfordshire Council was held on 5 May 2011, along with other United Kingdom local elections. The whole council was up for election following boundary changes, with each successful candidate serving a four-year term of office, expiring in 2015.

All councillors defending their seats this year were first elected in 2009, when the council was formed.

The Conservative Party retained an overall control on the council, winning 49 of the 59 seats on the council. Of the remaining 10 seats, 4 were won by the Liberal Democrats, 4 were won by Independents and the Labour Party won its first seat on the council.

== Results summary ==
Central Bedfordshire Council Election Result 2011
| Party | Seats | Gains | Losses | Net gain/loss | Seats % | Votes % | Votes | +/− |
|---|---|---|---|---|---|---|---|---|
| Conservative | 49 | | | -5 | 83.05 | 53.61 | 86,017 | +1.94 |
| Liberal Democrats | 5 | | | -6 | 8.47 | 14.36 | 23,040 | -14.58 |
| Independent | 4 | | | +3 | 6.78 | 8.05 | 12,922 | +4.02 |
| Labour | 1 | | | +1 | 1.70 | 22.23 | 35,668 | +10.18 |
| Green | 0 | | | 0 | 0.00 | 1.03 | 1,651 | -0.49 |
| UKIP | 0 | | | 0 | 0.00 | 0.72 | 1,150 | N/A |

The overall turnout was 41.73% with a total of 160,448 valid votes cast.

== Council composition ==
Prior to the election the composition of the council was:

↓
| 54 | 11 | 1 |
| Conservative | Lib Dem | I |

After the election, the composition of the council was:

↓
| 49 | 5 | 4 | 1 |
| Conservative | Lib Dem | I | L |

I - Independent
L - Labour

== Ward results ==
Asterisks denote incumbent Councillors seeking re-election. All results are listed below:

=== Ampthill ===
Ampthill (3 seats)
| Party | Candidate | Votes | % | ±% |
|---|---|---|---|---|
| Conservative | Paul Duckett* | 2,372 | 25.42 | |
| Independent | Mark Smith | 2,137 | 22.90 | |
| Conservative | Michael Blair | 2,133 | 22.85 | |
| Conservative | Howard Lockey | 1,883 | 20.17 | |
| Labour | Peter Joyce | 808 | 8.66 | |
| Majority | | 250 | 2.68 | |
| Turnout | | 9,333 | 48.10 | |
| Conservative win (new seat) | | | | |
| Independent win (new seat) | | | | |
| Conservative win (new seat) | | | | |

=== Arlesey ===
Arlesey (3 seats)
| Party | Candidate | Votes | % | ±% |
|---|---|---|---|---|
| Conservative | Rita Drinkwater* | 2,714 | 23.09 | |
| Conservative | Ian Dalgarno* | 2,575 | 21.90 | |
| Conservative | Richard Wenham | 2,460 | 20.93 | |
| Labour | David Devereux | 1,400 | 11.91 | |
| Labour | Douglas Landman | 1,304 | 11.09 | |
| Labour | Lorraine Warwick | 1,302 | 11.08 | |
| Majority | | 1,060 | 9.02 | |
| Turnout | | 11,755 | 41.00 | |
| Conservative win (new seat) | | | | |
| Conservative win (new seat) | | | | |
| Conservative win (new seat) | | | | |

Councillors Drinkwater and Dalgarno previously served as a Conservative Party Councillor in the Silsoe and Shillington ward Stotfold and Arlesey ward respectively.

=== Aspley & Woburn ===
Aspley & Woburn (1 seat)
| Party | Candidate | Votes | % | ±% |
|---|---|---|---|---|
| Conservative | Christopher Wells | 1,294 | 75.32 | |
| Labour | Rachel Lewington | 424 | 24.68 | |
| Majority | | 870 | 50.64 | |
| Turnout | | 1,718 | 46.60 | |
| Conservative win (new seat) | | | | |

=== Barton-Le-Clay ===
Barton-Le-Clay (1 seat)
| Party | Candidate | Votes | % | ±% |
|---|---|---|---|---|
| Independent | Ian Shingler | 615 | 31.91 | |
| Liberal Democrats | Janet Nunn* | 456 | 23.66 | |
| Conservative | Martin Hawkins | 406 | 21.07 | |
| Independent | Lyndon Davison-Williams | 225 | 11.68 | |
| Labour | Michael Wingrove | 137 | 7.11 | |
| UKIP | Steven Wildman | 88 | 4.57 | |
| Majority | | 159 | 8.25 | |
| Turnout | | 1,927 | 48.80 | |
| Independent win (new seat) | | | | |

Janet Nunn previously served as a councillor in the Barton Ward.

=== Biggleswade North ===
Biggleswade North (2 seats)
| Party | Candidate | Votes | % | ±% |
|---|---|---|---|---|
| Conservative | Jane Lawrence* | 997 | 27.08 | |
| Conservative | Maurice Jones* | 988 | 26.84 | |
| Labour | Bernard Briars | 883 | 23.99 | |
| Labour | Rex Skinner | 813 | 22.09 | |
| Majority | | 105 | 2.85 | |
| Turnout | | 3,681 | 38.20 | |
| Conservative win (new seat) | | | | |
| Conservative win (new seat) | | | | |

Councillors Lawrence and Jones both previously served as Councillors for the Biggleswade ward.

=== Biggleswade South ===
Biggleswade South (2 seats)
| Party | Candidate | Votes | % | ±% |
|---|---|---|---|---|
| Conservative | David Lawrence* | 1,648 | 30.43 | |
| Conservative | Peter Vickers | 1,604 | 29.61 | |
| Labour | Sheila Grayston | 1,121 | 20.70 | |
| Labour | Allister Dennis | 1,403 | 19.26 | |
| Majority | | 483 | 8.91 | |
| Turnout | | 5,416 | 41.70 | |
| Conservative win (new seat) | | | | |
| Conservative win (new seat) | | | | |

Councillors Lawrence and Vickers both previously served as Councillors for the Biggleswade ward.

=== Caddington ===
Caddington (2 seats)
| Party | Candidate | Votes | % | ±% |
|---|---|---|---|---|
| Conservative | Ruth Gammons* | 2,215 | 36.31 | |
| Conservative | Richard Stay* | 2,134 | 34.98 | |
| Labour | Daniel Heley | 711 | 11.65 | |
| Labour | Isaac Sibiya | 424 | 6.95 | |
| Liberal Democrats | Adrees Latif | 404 | 6.62 | |
| Liberal Democrats | Salma Nasir | 213 | 3.49 | |
| Majority | | 1,423 | 23.33 | |
| Turnout | | 6,101 | 47.20 | |
| Conservative win (new seat) | | | | |
| Conservative win (new seat) | | | | |

Councillors Gammons and Stay both previously served as Councillors for the South East Bedfordshire ward.

=== Cranfield & Marston Stable ===
Cranfield & Marston Stable (3 seats)
| Party | Candidate | Votes | % | ±% |
|---|---|---|---|---|
| Conservative | Susan Clark | 1,697 | 17.88 | |
| Conservative | Alan Bastable | 1,639 | 17.26 | |
| Conservative | Kenneth Matthews* | 1,596 | 16.81 | |
| Independent | James Baker | 890 | 9.38 | |
| Independent | Roger Baker* | 794 | 8.36 | |
| Labour | Miriam Gale | 732 | 7.71 | |
| Independent | Iain Clapham | 725 | 7.64 | |
| Labour | Alan Morris | 725 | 7.64 | |
| Labour | Laurence Pollock | 695 | 7.32 | |
| Majority | | 706 | 7.43 | |
| Turnout | | 9,493 | 39.20 | |
| Conservative win (new seat) | | | | |
| Conservative win (new seat) | | | | |
| Conservative win (new seat) | | | | |

Councillor Matthews previously served as a Councillor in the Cranfield ward and Roger Baker was previously elected as a Conservative Party councillor in the Marston ward.

=== Dunstable Central ===
Dunstable Central (1 seat)
| Party | Candidate | Votes | % | ±% |
|---|---|---|---|---|
| Conservative | Carole Hegley* | 841 | 64.64 | |
| Labour | Michael Hearty | 301 | 23.14 | |
| Liberal Democrats | Susan Thorne | 159 | 12.22 | |
| Majority | | 540 | 41.20 | |
| Turnout | | 1,301 | 39.00 | |
| Conservative win (new seat) | | | | |

Councillor Hegley previously served as a Councillor in the Dunstable Downs ward.

=== Dunstable Icknield ===
Dunstable Icknield (2 seats)
| Party | Candidate | Votes | % | ±% |
|---|---|---|---|---|
| Conservative | David McVicar* | 1,092 | | |
| Conservative | John Young | 948 | 20.64 | |
| Independent | Beryl Meakins | 803 | 17.48 | |
| Labour | Robert Shelley | 709 | 15.43 | |
| Labour | Michael Stokes | 682 | 14.85 | |
| Liberal Democrats | Patricia Larkman | 210 | 4.57 | |
| Liberal Democrats | Alan Winter | 150 | 3.26 | |
| Majority | | 145 | 3.16 | |
| Turnout | | 4,594 | 34.40 | |
| Conservative win (new seat) | | | | |
| Conservative win (new seat) | | | | |

Councillor McVicar previously served as a Councillor in the Icknield ward.

=== Dunstable Manshead ===
Dunstable Manshead (1 seat)
| Party | Candidate | Votes | % | ±% |
|---|---|---|---|---|
| Labour | Roger Pepworth | 591 | 42.98 | |
| Conservative | John Kane* | 584 | 42.47 | |
| Liberal Democrats | David Larkman | 200 | 14.55 | |
| Majority | | 7 | 0.51 | |
| Turnout | | 1,375 | 37.20 | |
| Labour win (new seat) | | | | |

Councillor Kane previously served as a Councillor in the Icknield ward.

=== Dunstable Northfields ===
Dunstable Northfields (2 seats)
| Party | Candidate | Votes | % | ±% |
|---|---|---|---|---|
| Independent | Julian Murray | 877 | 21.25 | |
| Conservative | Denise Green | 757 | 18.34 | |
| Conservative | Jeannette Freeman* | 753 | 18.25 | |
| Labour | Michael Rogers | 618 | 14.98 | |
| Labour | Duncan Ross | 594 | 14.39 | |
| Independent | Laurie Mansfield | 198 | 4.80 | |
| Liberal Democrats | Roderick Keyes | 168 | 4.07 | |
| Liberal Democrats | Anthony Swain | 117 | 2.83 | |
| Independent | Mary Norman | 45 | 1.09 | |
| Majority | | 4 | 0.09 | |
| Turnout | | 4,127 | 36.60 | |
| Independent win (new seat) | | | | |
| Conservative win (new seat) | | | | |

Councillor Murray and Jeannette Freeman previously served as Councillors in the Northfields ward.

=== Dunstable Watling ===
Dunstable Watling (2 seats)
| Party | Candidate | Votes | % | ±% |
|---|---|---|---|---|
| Conservative | Peter Hollick* | 2,074 | 34.35 | |
| Conservative | Ann Sparrow* | | | |
| Labour | Mark Cant | 723 | 11.97 | |
| Labour | Michelle Henderson | 713 | 11.81 | |
| Liberal Democrats | Richard Hunt | 256 | 4.24 | |
| Liberal Democrats | Ian Witherick | 250 | 4.14 | |
| Majority | | 52 | 0.86 | |
| Turnout | | 6,038 | 41.80 | |
| Conservative win (new seat) | | | | |
| Conservative win (new seat) | | | | |

Councillors Hollick and Sparrow previously served as Councillors in the Watling ward.

=== Eaton Bray ===
Eaton Bray (1 seat)
| Party | Candidate | Votes | % | ±% |
|---|---|---|---|---|
| Conservative | Marion Mustoe* | 1,164 | 75.00 | |
| Labour | Roger Croft | 298 | 19.20 | |
| Liberal Democrats | Lynda Walmsley | 90 | 5.80 | |
| Majority | | 866 | 55.80 | |
| Turnout | | 1,552 | 46.00 | |
| Conservative win (new seat) | | | | |

Councillor Mustoe previously served as a councillor in the South West Bedfordshire ward.

=== Flitwick ===
Flitwick (3 seats)
| Party | Candidate | Votes | % | ±% |
|---|---|---|---|---|
| Conservative | Andrew Turner* | 1,911 | 17.46 | |
| Conservative | Catherine Chapman | 1,607 | 14.68 | |
| Conservative | Charles Gomm | 1,587 | 14.50 | |
| Independent | Richard Harris | 1,000 | 9.13 | |
| Liberal Democrats | Stephen Mitchell | 875 | 7.99 | |
| Labour | David Short | 820 | 7.49 | |
| Labour | Shelid Gardner | 743 | 6.79 | |
| Liberal Democrats | Louise Watton | 687 | 6.28 | |
| Labour | James Gledhill | 603 | 5.51 | |
| Liberal Democrats | Henry Harding | 588 | 5.37 | |
| Green | Christopher Fryer | 526 | 4.80 | |
| Majority | | 587 | 5.37 | |
| Turnout | | 10,947 | 35.60 | |
| Conservative win (new seat) | | | | |
| Conservative win (new seat) | | | | |
| Conservative win (new seat) | | | | |

Councillor Turner previously served as a councillor in the Flitwick East ward.

=== Heath & Reach ===
Heath & Reach (1 seat)
| Party | Candidate | Votes | % | ±% |
|---|---|---|---|---|
| Conservative | Mark Versallion | 1,076 | 70.84 | |
| Labour | Anthony Kent | 293 | 19.29 | |
| Liberal Democrats | Elaine Morgan | 150 | 9.87 | |
| Majority | | 783 | 51.55 | |
| Turnout | | 1,519 | 47.00 | |
| Conservative win (new seat) | | | | |

=== Houghton Conquest & Haynes ===
Houghton Conquest & Haynes (1 seat)
| Party | Candidate | Votes | % | ±% |
|---|---|---|---|---|
| Conservative | Angela Barker | | | |
| Conservative win (new seat) | | | | |

Angela Barker was elected unopposed, after having previously served as a councillor in the Maulden & Houghton Conquest ward.

=== Houghton Hall ===
Houghton Hall (2 seats)
| Party | Candidate | Votes | % | ±% |
|---|---|---|---|---|
| Liberal Democrats | Susan Goodchild* | 856 | 25.12 | |
| Liberal Democrats | David Jones* | 699 | 20.51 | |
| Conservative | John Chatterley | 571 | 16.75 | |
| Conservative | Peter Swaisland | 445 | 13.06 | |
| Labour | Paul Cunningham | 429 | 12.59 | |
| Labour | Maria Jones | 408 | 11.97 | |
| Majority | | 128 | 3.76 | |
| Turnout | | 3,408 | 32.10 | |
| Liberal Democrats win (new seat) | | | | |
| Liberal Democrats win (new seat) | | | | |

Councillors Goodchild and Jones previously served as councillors in the Houghton Regis ward.

=== Leighton Buzzard North ===
Leighton Buzzard North (3 seats)
| Party | Candidate | Votes | % | ±% |
|---|---|---|---|---|
| Conservative | Roy Johnstone* | 2,145 | 19.30 | |
| Conservative | Brian Spurr* | 2,062 | 18.56 | |
| Conservative | Alan Shadbolt | 1,943 | 17.48 | |
| Labour | Michael Bishop | 1,060 | 9.54 | |
| Labour | Heather Copley | 1,059 | 9.53 | |
| Labour | Daniel Scott | 911 | 8.20 | |
| Liberal Democrats | Anne Guess | 711 | 6.40 | |
| Liberal Democrats | Sheila Mercer | 648 | 5.83 | |
| Liberal Democrats | Rosalind Mennie | 573 | 5.16 | |
| Majority | | 883 | 7.94 | |
| Turnout | | 11,112 | 36.90 | |
| Conservative win (new seat) | | | | |
| Conservative win (new seat) | | | | |
| Conservative win (new seat) | | | | |

Councillors Johnstone and Spurr previously served as councillors in the Leighton Linslade Central ward.

=== Leighton Buzzard South ===
Leighton Buzzard South (3 seats)
| Party | Candidate | Votes | % | ±% |
|---|---|---|---|---|
| Conservative | Raymond Berry* | 1,525 | 19.69 | |
| Conservative | David Bowater* | 1,513 | 19.53 | |
| Conservative | Amanda Dodwell | 1,510 | 19.49 | |
| Labour | John Bone | 868 | 11.20 | |
| Labour | Christopher Northedge | 743 | 9.59 | |
| Liberal Democrats | Anne Gray | 543 | 7.01 | |
| Liberal Democrats | Nigel Carnell | 528 | 6.82 | |
| Liberal Democrats | Celia Snelling | 517 | 6.67 | |
| Majority | | 642 | 8.29 | |
| Turnout | | 7,747 | 36.00 | |
| Conservative win (new seat) | | | | |
| Conservative win (new seat) | | | | |
| Conservative win (new seat) | | | | |

Councillor Berry previously served as a councillor in the Grovebury ward and Councillor Bowater previously served as a councillor in the Leighton Linslade Central ward.

=== Linslade ===
Linslade (3 seats)
| Party | Candidate | Votes | % | ±% |
|---|---|---|---|---|
| Conservative | David Hopkin* | 1,990 | 17.30 | |
| Conservative | Kenneth Janes | 1,486 | 12.92 | |
| Conservative | Nigel Warren | 1,394 | 12.12 | |
| Liberal Democrats | Peter Snelling* | 1,378 | 11.98 | |
| Liberal Democrats | John Freeman | 1,332 | 11.58 | |
| Liberal Democrats | Russell Goodchild | 1,113 | 9.67 | |
| Labour | Peter Palfrey | 790 | 6.87 | |
| Labour | Joan Rampley | 728 | 6.33 | |
| Green | Kenneth Barry | 671 | 5.83 | |
| Labour | Maurice Rampley | 621 | 5.40 | |
| Majority | | 16 | 0.14 | |
| Turnout | | 11,503 | 46.00 | |
| Conservative win (new seat) | | | | |
| Conservative win (new seat) | | | | |
| Conservative win (new seat) | | | | |

Councillor Hopkin and Peter Snelling previously served as councillors in the Southcott ward.

=== Northill ===
Northill (1 seat)
| Party | Candidate | Votes | % | ±% |
|---|---|---|---|---|
| Conservative | Patricia Turner* | 1,220 | 68.31 | |
| Labour | Dennis James | 296 | 16.57 | |
| Liberal Democrats | Patrick Jones | 270 | 15.12 | |
| Majority | | 924 | 51.74 | |
| Turnout | | 1,786 | 50.90 | |
| Conservative win (new seat) | | | | |

Councillor Turner previously served as a councillor in the Northill & Blunham ward.

=== Parkside ===
Parkside (1 seat)
| Party | Candidate | Votes | % | ±% |
|---|---|---|---|---|
| Liberal Democrats | Rita Egan | 374 | 40.39 | |
| Independent | Rae Bird | 358 | 38.66 | |
| Labour | Iain Matharu | 194 | 20.95 | |
| Majority | | 16 | 1.73 | |
| Turnout | | 926 | 30.10 | |
| Liberal Democrats win (new seat) | | | | |

Councillor Egan previously served as a councillor in the Houghton Regis ward.

=== Potton ===
Potton (2 seats)
| Party | Candidate | Votes | % | ±% |
|---|---|---|---|---|
| Independent | Adam Zerny | 1,824 | 36.42 | |
| Conservative | Doreen Gurney* | 1,204 | 24.04 | |
| Conservative | Anita Lewis | 1,116 | 22.28 | |
| Labour | Andrew Hopkins | 462 | 9.23 | |
| Labour | Paul Rogers | 402 | 8.03 | |
| Majority | | 88 | 1.76 | |
| Turnout | | 5,008 | 50.40 | |
| Independent win (new seat) | | | | |
| Conservative win (new seat) | | | | |

Councillor Gurney and Anita Lewis previously served as councillors in the Potton ward.

=== Sandy ===
Sandy (3 seats)
| Party | Candidate | Votes | % | ±% |
|---|---|---|---|---|
| Conservative | Caroline Maudlin | 1,753 | 16.84 | |
| Conservative | Naomi Sheppard | 1,698 | 16.31 | |
| Liberal Democrats | Nigel Aldis* | 1,334 | 12.82 | |
| Conservative | Benson Themuka | 1,256 | 12.07 | |
| Liberal Democrats | Anthony Baines | 911 | 8.75 | |
| Liberal Democrats | Glenys Leach | 798 | 7.67 | |
| Labour | Sandra Lunn | 673 | 6.47 | |
| Labour | Kevin Edwards | 672 | 6.46 | |
| Labour | Cheryl McDonald | 666 | 6.40 | |
| UKIP | George Konstantinidis | 646 | 6.21 | |
| Majority | | 78 | 0.75 | |
| Turnout | | 10,407 | 37.50 | |
| Conservative win (new seat) | | | | |
| Conservative win (new seat) | | | | |
| Liberal Democrats win (new seat) | | | | |

Councillor Aldis previously served as a councillor in the Sandy ward.

=== Shefford ===
Shefford (2 seats)
| Party | Candidate | Votes | % | ±% |
|---|---|---|---|---|
| Conservative | Lewis Birt* | 1,459 | 30.57 | |
| Conservative | Anthony Brown* | 1,402 | 29.37 | |
| Liberal Democrats | Paul Mackin | 637 | 13.35 | |
| Labour | Nigel Rushby | 551 | 11.54 | |
| UKIP | Jonathan Shilton | 416 | 8.72 | |
| Liberal Democrats | John Goode | 308 | 6.45 | |
| Majority | | 765 | 16.02 | |
| Turnout | | 4,773 | 41.50 | |
| Conservative win (new seat) | | | | |
| Conservative win (new seat) | | | | |

Councillors Birt and Brown previously served as councillors in the Shefford ward.

=== Silsoe & Shillington ===
Silsoe & Shillington (1 seat)
| Party | Candidate | Votes | % | ±% |
|---|---|---|---|---|
| Conservative | Iain MacKilligan | 733 | 46.22 | |
| Liberal Democrats | Alison Graham* | 649 | 40.92 | |
| Green | Christopher Puleston | 103 | 6.49 | |
| Labour | Carolyn Devereux | 101 | 6.37 | |
| Majority | | 84 | 5.30 | |
| Turnout | | 1,586 | 51.50 | |
| Conservative win (new seat) | | | | |

Alison Graham previously served as a councillor in the Silsoe and Shillington ward.

=== Stotfold & Langford ===
Stotfold & Langford (3 seats)
| Party | Candidate | Votes | % | ±% |
|---|---|---|---|---|
| Conservative | Alan Saunders | 2,227 | 18.14 | |
| Conservative | John Saunders* | 2,162 | 17.61 | |
| Conservative | Jonathan Clarke | 2,063 | 16.81 | |
| Independent | John Street | 1,150 | 9.37 | |
| Independent | Christina Turner | 926 | 7.55 | |
| Labour | Paul Bouch | 760 | 6.19 | |
| Liberal Democrats | Brian Collier | 756 | 6.16 | |
| Labour | George Legate | 670 | 5.46 | |
| Labour | Satinderjit Singh Dhaliwal | 652 | 5.31 | |
| Liberal Democrats | Isabella Collier | 504 | 4.11 | |
| Liberal Democrats | Timothy Troon | 404 | 3.29 | |
| Majority | | 913 | 7.44 | |
| Turnout | | 12,274 | 46.10 | |
| Conservative win (new seat) | | | | |
| Conservative win (new seat) | | | | |
| Conservative win (new seat) | | | | |

Councillor John Saunders previously served as a councillor in the Stotfold and Arlesey ward and Councillor Clarke previously served as a councillor in the Langford, Bedfordshire|Langford and Henlow Village ward.

=== Tithe Farm ===
Tithe Farm (1 seat)
| Party | Candidate | Votes | % | ±% |
|---|---|---|---|---|
| Liberal Democrats | Peter Williams* | 514 | 54.62 | |
| Labour | Robert Roche | 427 | 45.38 | |
| Majority | | 87 | 9.24 | |
| Turnout | | 941 | 32.10 | |
| Liberal Democrats win (new seat) | | | | |

Councillor Williams previously served as a councillor in the Houghton Regis ward.

=== Toddington ===
Toddington (2 seats)
| Party | Candidate | Votes | % | ±% |
|---|---|---|---|---|
| Conservative | Thomas Nicols* | 1,714 | 27.03 | |
| Conservative | Norman Costin* | 1,603 | 25.28 | |
| Liberal Democrats | Brian Golby | 1,014 | 15.99 | |
| Liberal Democrats | Linda Jack | 696 | 10.97 | |
| Labour | Rachel Garnham | 689 | 10.86 | |
| Labour | Peter Turner | 626 | 9.87 | |
| Majority | | 589 | 9.29 | |
| Turnout | | 6,342 | 44.30 | |
| Conservative win (new seat) | | | | |
| Conservative win (new seat) | | | | |

Councillors Nicols and Costin previously served as councillors in the Toddington ward.

=== Westoning, Flitton & Greenfield ===
Westoning, Flitton & Greenfield (1 seat)
| Party | Candidate | Votes | % | ±% |
|---|---|---|---|---|
| Conservative | James Jamieson* | 1,052 | 59.84 | |
| Independent | Henry Howden | 355 | 20.19 | |
| Green | Richard Ellis | 351 | 19.97 | |
| Majority | | 697 | 39.65 | |
| Turnout | | 1,758 | 48.10 | |
| Conservative win (new seat) | | | | |

Councillor Jamieson previously served as a councillor in the Flitwick East ward.
