= Shillington, Bedfordshire =

Village in Bedfordshire, England

Shillington
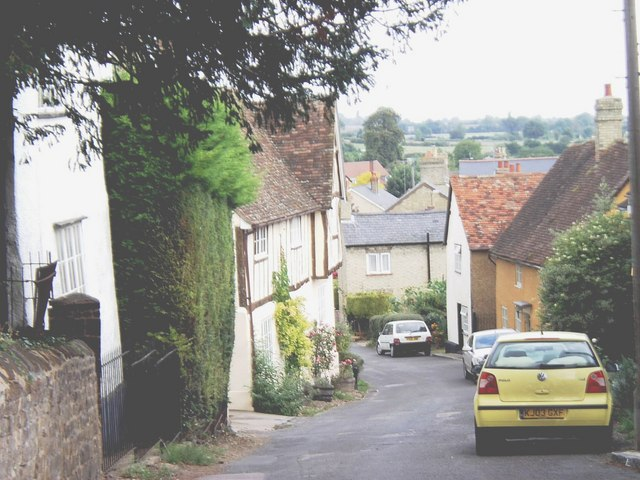
- Church Street

- Location within Bedfordshire
- Area: 1.79 km^{2} (0.69 sq mi)
- Population: 1,842 (2011 census)
  - Density: 1,029/km^{2} (2,670/sq mi)
- OS grid reference: TL127340
- Civil parish: Shillington
- Unitary authority: Central Bedfordshire
- Ceremonial county: Bedfordshire
- Region: East
- Country: England
- Sovereign state: United Kingdom
- Post town: HITCHIN
- Postcode district: SG5
- Dialling code: 01462
- Police: Bedfordshire
- Fire: Bedfordshire
- Ambulance: East of England
- UK Parliament: Hitchin

Shillington is a village and civil parish in Bedfordshire, England. In the south of the parish the hamlet of Pegsdon includes the Pegsdon hills nature reserve and is a salient of the county into Hertfordshire. Since 1985 its administration has included the village of Higham Gobion, south-west on the minor road leading to the main north–south road in the district, the A6. It has a population of 1,831 and is centred midway between stopping services railway stations on the Midland Main Line and East Coast Main Line 6 miles (9.7 km) away. Farmland and hedgerows forms 95% of the land use and to the south and north of the boundaries is intermittent woodland.

== History ==
On 2 June 1977 the parish was renamed from "Shillington" to "Shillington & Stondon". On 1 April 1985 "Shillington & Stondon" parish was abolished and divided between "Shillington" and Stondon.

=== Etymology ===
The village's name evolved through Sethlindone (6th century), Suthlingdon (8th century), Shutlyngdene, Shetelyngton (14th century), and then into an unfortunate Shytlington in official returns and letters of the 17th and 18th centuries, and Shittington even until the 1881 census. The name was later bowdlerised.

=== Early history ===
Miscellaneous Roman artefacts have been found. Most notably, the Shillington Hoard, consisting of 127 gold aurei, was discovered in 1998.

Shillington is mentioned in the Domesday Book. The entry is headed: "Sethlindone: [overlord] St Benedict's of Ramsey. a broken mill, 2 others". It contained 34 households, of which four were slaves, however 27 were villagers or villeins, and five were homes of more independent smallholders. Per year it rendered a large £12, assessed by the Book's compilers to be the same at the conquest twenty years before, had 14 ploughlands and woodland for 100 pigs per year.

=== Manors ===
Shillington of Shillington Bury

Until the Dissolution of the Monasteries the powerful Ramsey Abbey held this, with its noble arms of three rams heads with golden horns on a blue band, set on a gold (or yellow backdrop), i.e. "or a bend azure".

Including much of Pegsbury as well as the hub of the village, at the Dissolution it was valued at £88 2s. 10d per year and formed part of the (royal) honour of Ampthill, conferred on Princess Elizabeth, remaining in the Royal Family until after James I (or VI of Scotland).

Its mesne lords (intermediate landlords) included George Rotherham (21 years), Sir Henry Hobart (99 years) for Anthony Chester (assumed title three years later), Dr. Peter Barwick, Roger Gillingham, John Borrett and finally the 1764 will of John Briscoe bequeathing Shillington Bury to Henry Earl of Sussex for life, remainder to the daughters of the late chivalric Bath King of Arms, Grey Longueville. As such, it settled in 1800 on Grey Arnold and cousin Bridget Frances Anne. Little is known of the mid-19th century except for a sale by a Miss Profit to the father of William Hanscombe, the 1908 lord of the manor.

Shillington or Apsley Bury (Tudor to Georgian subdivision)

This secondary manor was sold in 1760 to Joseph Musgrave, and henceforward it follows the same descent as Aspley Bury manor below.

In 1476, when Thomas Lawley first transferred this so-called manor held of the Abbey to Thomas Rotherham Archbishop of York who left it at his death in 1500 to Thomas Rotherham, son of his brother John. His grandson Thomas and his wife Alice, for their lives were later heirs, then George, their son, who held the manor from 1561 to 1599. Then came his son John, having succeeded him, who appears to have alienated (sold or lost) this manor, as in the case of Luton to Sir Robert Napier, who held manorial court here in 1651 and like Luton it remained in this family to the death of Sir John Napier in 1714. In 1748 the manorial court was held by Sir Conyers D'Arcy, and in 1759 by his kinsman, the former Ambassador at Venice (to Italy), and at the Hague (to the Netherlands) Robert Darcy, 4th Earl of Holderness.

Apsley or Apsley Bury

Owners in succession from 1504, for this is a later manor, have been only four families: Lane, Eton, Sir John Franklin's and his grandson-in-law's, that of Sir Christopher Musgrave (with subsequent Musgraves until 1908).

=== Charities ===
Charity of Edward Pilsworth produced in 1908 a sum of £12 14s "received annually from the Clothworkers Company, London", applied as follows: £10 8s. in money generally among fifty parishioners, £1 to the vicar, 16s. (80% of that amount) for repair of church, and 10s. to the churchwardens who assisted in its administration.

In 1796 Samuel Whitbread, esq., by will, left £10 10s a year, charged on the manor of Cardington, for providing clothing for the inmates (occupants) of the four almshouses situated in the churchyard. In 1897 this annuity was redeemed by making a transfer of India stock.

=== World War II (1939–1945) ===
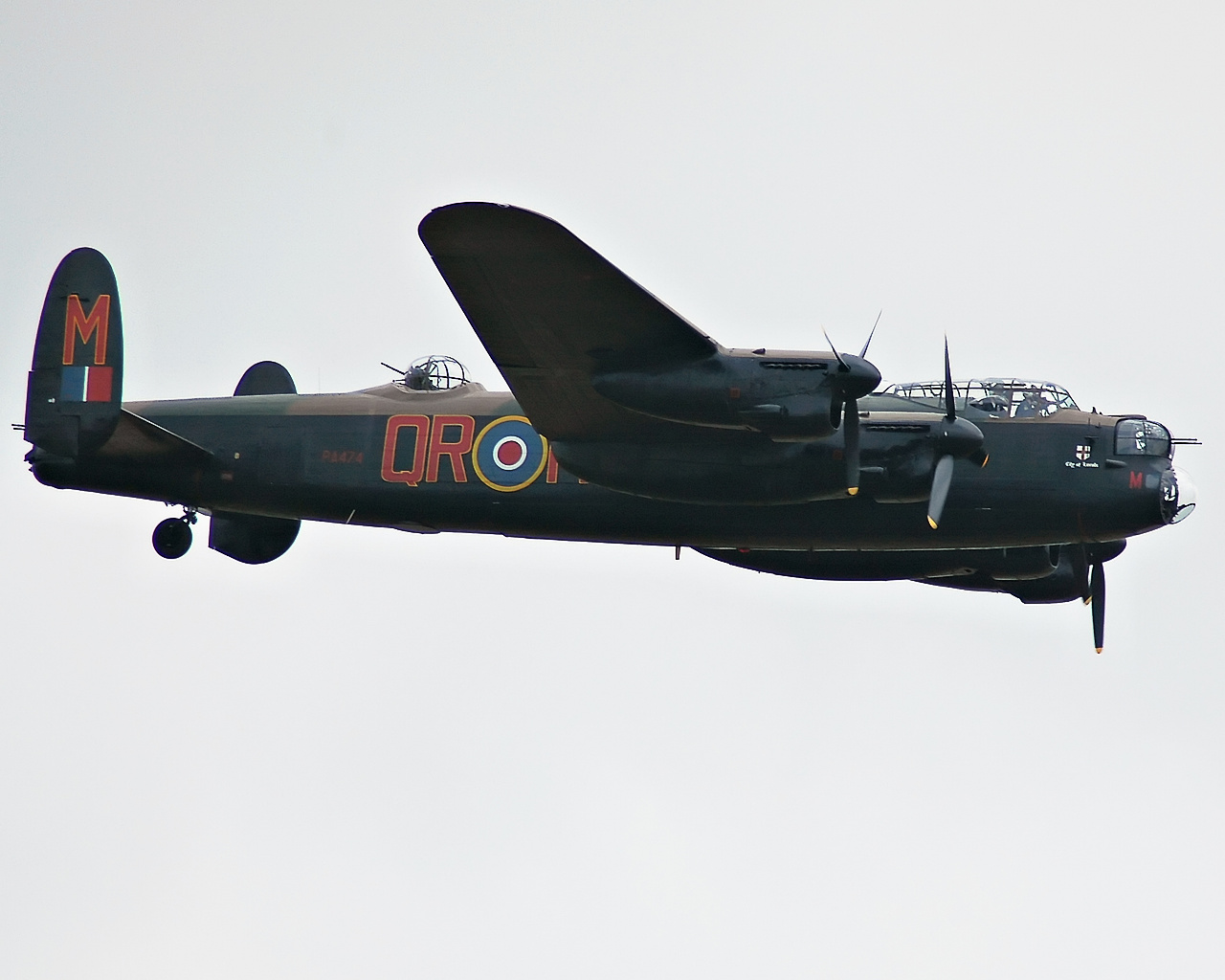
Avro Lancaster

In 1940 a Luftwaffe Dornier Do 17 was attacked over Great Offley (to the south of Pegsdon), the bomber crashed killing the pilot alongside the road at Pegsdon.

On 21 February 1944 Lancaster LL729 (A4 B) belonging to 115 Squadron RAF left its base at RAF Witchford for a raid on Stuttgart, several hours later the plane crashed killing its crew near Pegsdon whilst trying to return to its base.

== Geography ==
Hamlets in the parish include Pegsdon on high ground south of the village on the hills which form the Hertfordshire border, Aspley — with Aspley Bury manor — to the south, Little Holwell, to the east, and Woodmer End and Bury End close to the village on the north.

Lower Stondon formerly in the north-east of the parish was united with Upper Stondon to form Stondon parish in 1985.

== Governance ==
Shillington Parish Council is the lowest tier of local government. The parish of Shillington is in the Central Bedfordshire ward of Meppershall and Shillington for the election of councillors to serve on Central Bedfordshire Council, and under the Parliamentary Constituencies Order 2023 is part of the Mid Bedfordshire Parliamentary Constituency for election of a Member of Parliament.

== Demography and topography ==
A local adage is that 'all roads lead away from Shillington' — somewhat true as more efficient routes avoid the village altogether. Shillington is though not demographically, physically agricultural — mostly green-buffered strings of homes and working farms with farmhouses across a broad area. In all 1.69;km^{2} of its 1.78–km^{2} is 'greenspace' leaving the remainder largely domestic gardens, roads, buildings and watercourses. The number of residents increased by a net total of 11 (0.5%) in the ten years to 2011.

== Localities ==
=== Apsley End ===
51.993°N 0.3680°W
Historically Aspley End (see manors above), this small gently sloping hamlet unusually has three moated sites in a line from north to south, all scheduled ancient monuments, two with ponds, one of which was a fishpond. The other, Pirton Grange has a settling pond, moat remains and enclosure.

Sixteen houses or farmhouses are listed here for architecture, fifteen at Grade II.

Pirton Grange

At Grade II*, this is the highest listed secular building of the parish and has 15th and 16th century parts, a c. 1690 hall roof and mostly timber-framed construction, however Victorian chimneys and fireplaces.

== Facilities ==
Local amenities include two shops (one in the old Methodist church), and several public houses.

== Education ==
Shillington Lower School caters for children between the ages of 4 to 9 and since 2017 has had a separate building for pre-school. Shillington is in the catchment zone for Robert Bloomfield Academy, a middle school and Samuel Whitbread Academy, an upper school with sixth form.

A national school was established in the village in 1856 under the auspices of the Church of England. It included two classrooms, one for boys and the other for girls and had a capacity of 120 pupils. The school became overcrowded and so a new room for infants was added. A school board was formed in 1874 to take over the management of the school. In 1878, the school relocated to new buildings on an adjoining site. Under the Education Act 1944, the school became a county primary run by the education department of Bedfordshire County Council. By the early 1960s the accommodation was deemed to be inadequate and hence new buildings were constructed in Greenfields in 1963, the old school buildings were subsequently converted for residential use.

== All Saints Church ==
All Saints Church is mostly 14th century, with an 18th-century tower and is grade I listed. The Church is a contender for the most easterly in the triangular chalk belt enclosing most of South-East England all of East Anglia. (Note: The parish is mainly on the north terraces of the Chilterns' flatter north-eastern section, a chalk escarpment of informal starting point at the Barton Hills – as noted by geologist William Smith, its newer strata remains intact all the way to a broad culmination at the North Sea coast alongside The Wash and north-west Norfolk.) The building was originally a Saxon monastery, which grew richer and more influential through the mining and selling of coprolite, fossilised dinosaur dung, once used as a fuel and also a fertiliser. It is known as "The Cathedral of the Chilterns".
