= Higham Gobion Castle =

Castle in the United Kingdom

- Higham Gobion, Bedfordshire, England

Site information
- Type: Castle
- Condition: Earthworks

Location
- Shown within Bedfordshire
- Coordinates: 51.9868°N 0.3914°W
- Grid reference: grid reference TL10563326

Higham Gobion Castle was once believed to be an 11th-century castle located in the village of Higham Gobion. Now it is part of the civil parish of Shillington, in the English county of Bedfordshire. It has since been determined that the site was in fact a fishery with a breeding island that was mistaken for a defendable moated building of some sort.

The "castle" was located 3 miles from Pirton Castle, and 14 miles south of Bedford Castle.

Only earthworks remain at the site. Roman Antiquities, such as coins, millstone and cinerary urns have been discovered near the site.

== See also ==
- Castles in Great Britain and Ireland
- List of castles in England
