= Wardown Park Museum =

Museum in Luton, Bedfordshire, England

Wardown House Museum And Gallery
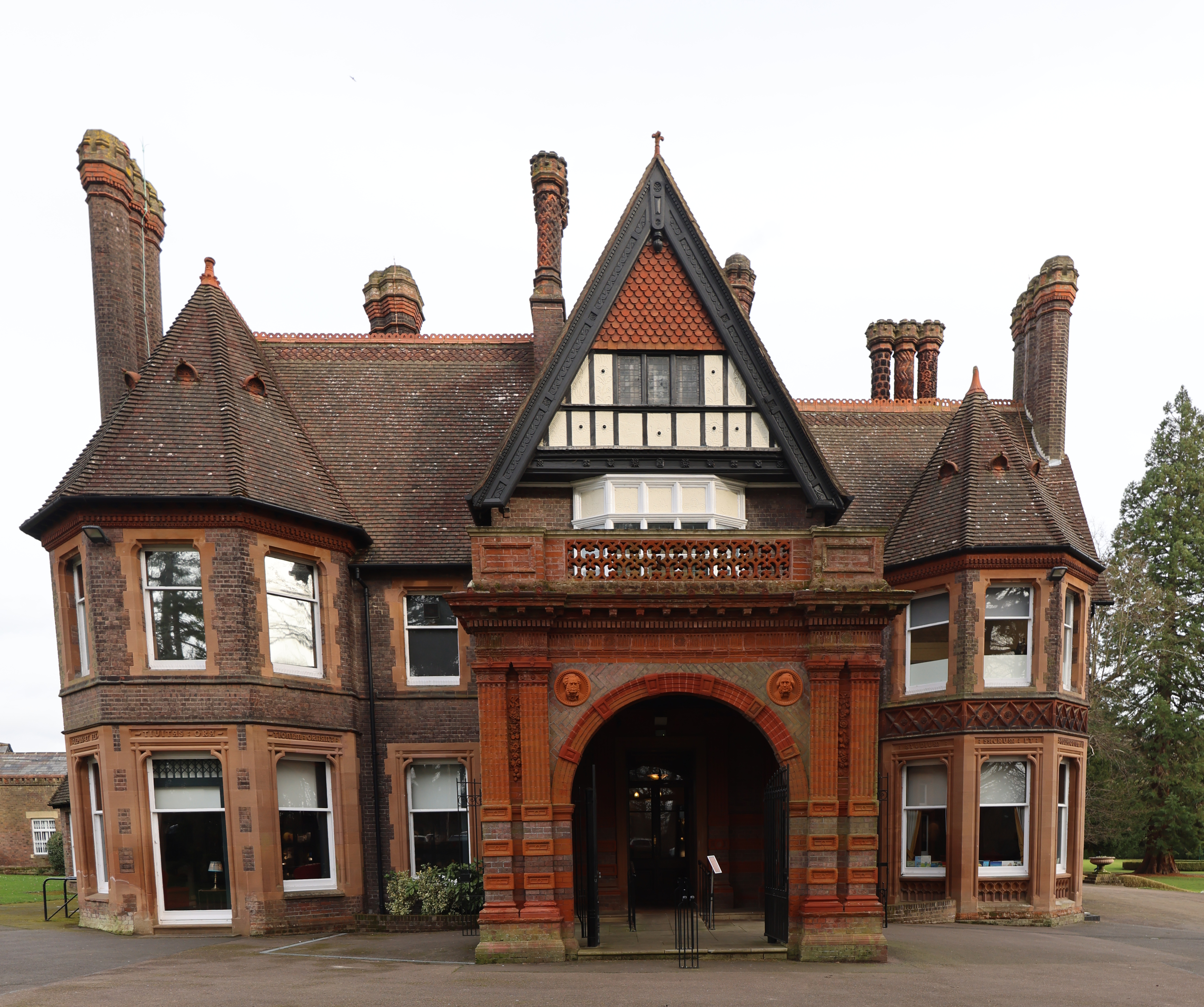
- Wardown Park Museum

- Shown within Bedfordshire
- Established: 1931
- Location: Wardown Park, Old Bedford Road, Luton, England
- Coordinates: 51.896°N 0.418°W
- Type: Crafts of Bedfordshire
- Website: Wardown House, Museum & Gallery

Wardown House Museum and Gallery, formerly Wardown Park Museum and, before that, the Luton Museum & Art Gallery, in Luton, is housed in a large Victorian mansion in Wardown Park on the outskirts of the town centre. The museum collection focuses on the traditional crafts of Bedfordshire, notably lace-making and hat-making. There are samples of Bedfordshire lace from as early as the 17th century.

== History ==
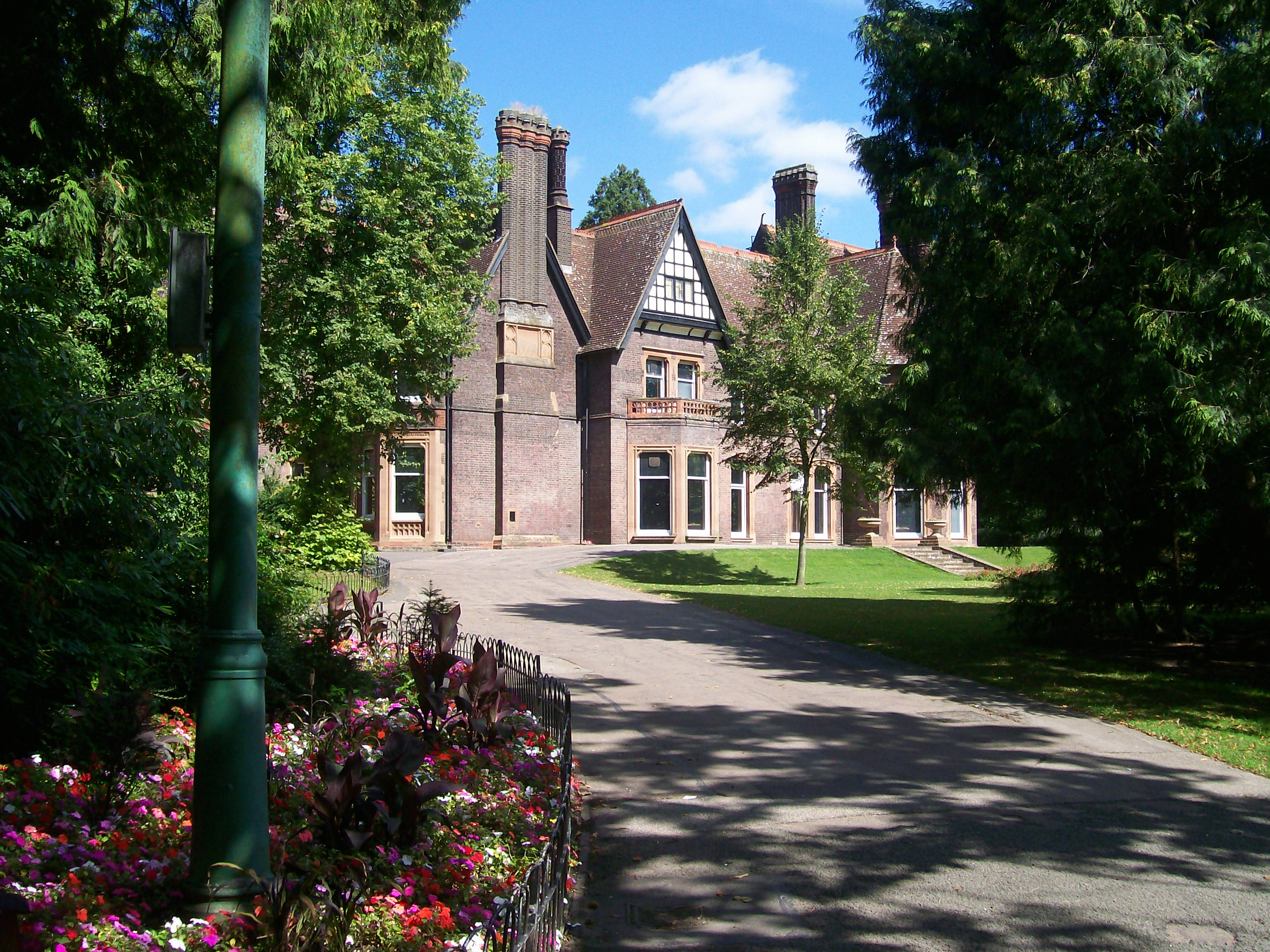
Wardown Park Museum and just part of its extensive grounds

Robert How built the first property within the park, called Bramingham Shott, which is the current home to the museum. In the early 1870s the estate was taken over by local solicitor, Frank Chapman-Scargill, he rebuilt much of the earlier house in 1879 for a total cost of £10,000. Scargill left Luton in 1893 and the house and property was acquired by lime burner Benjamin John Harfield Forder, who renamed the estate Wardown, after the hill (War Down) behind his family home at Buriton, Hampshire.

In 1903, Forder and his partners, Halley Stewart and Sir Malcolm Stewart, who later acquired the London Brick Company, decided to sell the house and 11-acre (4.5 ha) park, and placed the property up for sale. The property was bought by Luton Council in 1904. Over the next few years extensive improvements were implemented, many new trees were planted, as well as new footpaths and bridges being constructed. The layout of the park today is very much as it was in this period. A bowling green was built in 1905.

During the First World War Wardown House was pressed into service as a hospital, firstly by the Royal Army Medical Corps, and then the Voluntary Aid Detachments of the British Red Cross Society. Mrs Nora Durler and Mrs Mary Green were the Joint Commandants. The Luton Museum was transferred to the house in 1931.

== Description ==
The museum has a collection of circa 700 hats and pieces of headwear. The Bedfordshire and Hertfordshire Regiment gallery, produced by the Imperial War Museum, explains the history of the local regiment.

The first floor galleries were refurbished and opened as the Luton Life displays in February 2003. This was partly funded by the Heritage Lottery Fund. The museum displays explore stories of Luton people over the past 150 years.

The ground floor displays include the Living Landscape gallery which displays local archaeology and natural history, including the Shillington Roman coin hoard and an Iron Age mirror.

== The Wenlock Jug ==
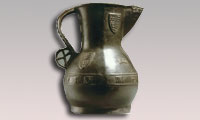
The Wenlock Jug

The jug is a rare surviving example of an English bronze jug from the 15th century, with great significance for the study of bronze working in medieval England. It was nearly sold to New York's Metropolitan Museum of Art for £750,000 but was export-stopped in October 2005 by culture minister, David Lammy, based on a recommendation by the Reviewing Committee on the Export of Works of Art and Objects of Cultural Interest, run by the Museums, Libraries and Archives Council. Instead it was bought by Luton Museums Service for 300 times its normal annual acquisitions budget to equal the offer of the Metropolitan. On 14 May 2012 it was reported that the jug had been stolen following a break in at the Stockwood Discovery Centre in Luton. It was recovered after being found in a lock-up garage in Epsom on 24 September 2012.
