= Upper Stondon =

Village in Bedfordshire, England

Coordinates: 52.00718°N 0.32959°W

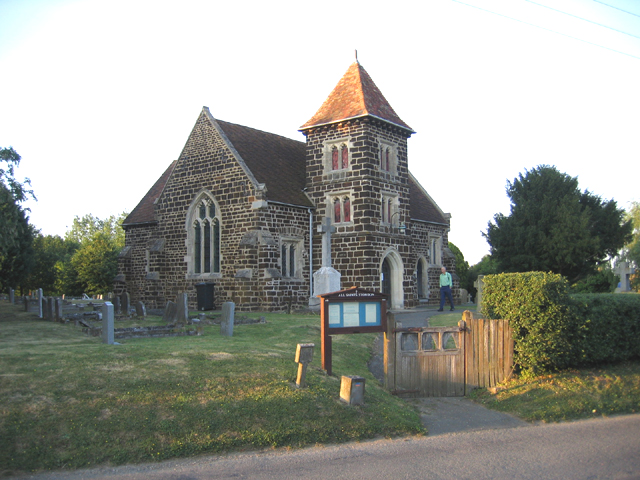
- All Saints' church

- Location within Bedfordshire
- OS grid reference: TL147356
- Civil parish: Stondon
- Unitary authority: Central Bedfordshire
- Ceremonial county: Bedfordshire
- Region: East
- Country: England
- Sovereign state: United Kingdom
- Post town: HENLOW
- Postcode district: SG16
- Dialling code: 01462
- Police: Bedfordshire
- Fire: Bedfordshire
- Ambulance: East of England
- UK Parliament: Mid Bedfordshire

Upper Stondon is a village in the civil parish of Stondon, in the Central Bedfordshire district, in the ceremonial county of Bedfordshire, England.

Upper Stondon is a very small settlement with few amenities. However, the village of Lower Stondon and nearby Henlow Camp have extensive local amenities and services.

On 1 April 1985 the parish was abolished to form Stondon. At the 1981 census (the last before the abolition of the parish), Upper Stondon had a population of 114.
