= Higham Gobion =

Village in Bedfordshire, England

Coordinates: 51.982°N 0.394°W

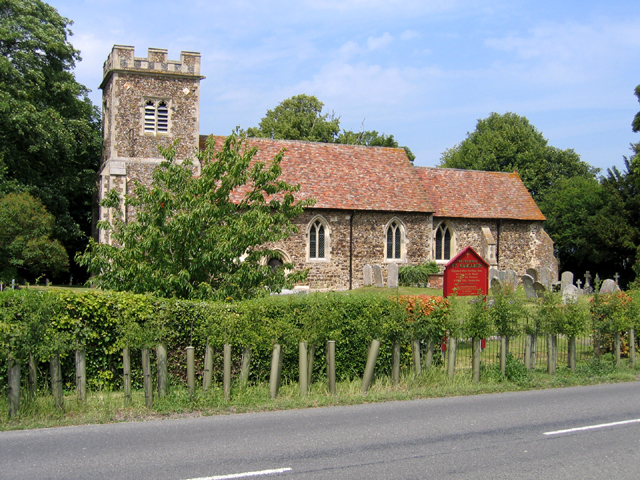
- Parish church of St Margaret

- Location within Bedfordshire
- OS grid reference: TL102823
- Civil parish: Shillington
- Unitary authority: Central Bedfordshire
- Ceremonial county: Bedfordshire
- Region: East
- Country: England
- Sovereign state: United Kingdom
- Post town: HITCHIN
- Postcode district: SG5
- Dialling code: 01582
- Police: Bedfordshire
- Fire: Bedfordshire
- Ambulance: East of England
- UK Parliament: Mid Bedfordshire

Higham Gobion is a village in the civil parish of Shillington, in the Central Bedfordshire district of Bedfordshire, England. It is located between the villages of Shillington and Barton-le-Clay.

This hilltop village, which consists of a church, farm and small industrial unit and one or two houses, gets the second part of its name from the Gobion family, who resided in this area after the Norman invasion of 1066. In the fields a mile north-east of the church are triangular earthworks and medieval fishponds, all that remain today of a substantial deserted medieval village. Roman pottery has also been found in the field east of the former Rectory.

The Anglican church, dedicated to St. Margaret, dates from c.1300, but was much restored during the Victorian period. It contains a monument to Dr. Edmund Castell, who died in 1674 and was a Professor of Arabic at Cambridge. He was a rector at Higham during the last years of his life and lived in the adjoining (and much restored), former rectory. The church is part of the Diocese of St Albans.

Higham Gobion was an ancient parish in the Flitt hundred of Bedfordshire. The parish was abolished in 1985 and its area absorbed into the neighbouring parish of Shillington. At the 1981 census (the last before the abolition of the parish), Higham Gobion had a population of 24.

== Education ==
It is in the catchment zone for Robert Bloomfield Academy.

Additionally, the majority of this community is in the catchment area for Samuel Whitbread Academy, which has upper secondary and sixth form.

== See also ==
- Higham Gobion Castle
