= Shillington Hoard =

Roman coin hoard

Coordinates: 51.970°N 0.363°W

The Shillington Hoard is a Roman coin hoard found in Shillington, Bedfordshire in 1998. It consisted of 127 gold aurei, the latest of which was from 79 AD. The coins were issued by Tiberius, Claudius, Nero, Galba, Otho, Vitellius, and Vespasian.

Metal detectorists Shane Pyper and Simon Leete discovered 123 aurei in October 1998. They also found a much smaller hoard of seven silver denarii a few metres away. In September 1999, Pyper and Leete found a further four aurei and eleven denarii, making a total of 127 aurei and 18 denarii. Ten of the denarii are Republican, and one was of Hadrian from 128 AD, so the relationship between the gold and silver hoards is uncertain.

The coins appear to have been deposited without intention of recovery, perhaps as a votive offering at a Romano-Celtic temple. They are now on display at the Wardown Park Museum in Luton.
