= 2019 Central Bedfordshire Council election =

2019 UK local government election

- 2 May 2019

All 59 seats to Central Bedfordshire Council 30 seats needed for a majority

	First party	Second party	Third party
Leader	James Jamieson
Party	Conservative	Independent	Liberal Democrats
Last election	53 seats, 53.8%	3 seats, 10.4%	1 seat, 5.1%
Seats won	41	13	3
Seat change	▼12	▲10	▲2
Popular vote	61,375	25,913	13,745
Percentage	43.3%	18.3%	9.7%
Swing	▼10.0%	▲7.9%	▲4.6%
	Fourth party	Fifth party
Party	Labour	UKIP
Last election	2 seats, 16.8%	0 seats, 8.2%
Seats won	1	1
Seat change	▼1	▲1
Popular vote	28,107	7,596
Percentage	19.8%	5.4%
Swing	▼2.5%	▼2.8%
- Winner of each seat at the 2019 Central Bedfordshire Council election
Council control before election
Conservative
Council control after election
Conservative

Elections to Central Bedfordshire Council were held on 2 May 2019, along with other local elections. The whole council was up for election, with each successful candidate serving a four-year term of office, expiring in 2023.

== Summary ==
=== Election result ===
2019 Central Bedfordshire Council election
Party	Candidates	Seats	Gains	Losses	Net gain/loss	Seats %	Votes %	Votes	+/−
Conservative	58	41	0	12	▼12	69.5	43.3	61,375	–10.0
Independent	24	13	10	0	▲10	22.0	18.3	25,913	+7.9
Liberal Democrats	28	3	2	0	▲2	5.1	9.7	13,745	+4.6
Labour	59	1	0	1	▼1	1.7	19.8	28,107	+2.5
UKIP	18	1	1	0	▲1	1.7	5.4	7,596	–2.8
Green	9	0	0	0	Steady	0.0	3.2	4,540	–2.5
Women's Equality	1	0	0	0	Steady	0.0	0.2	274	N/A
Renew	1	0	0	0	Steady	0.0	0.2	241	N/A

== Ward results ==
=== Ampthill ===
Ampthill (3 seats)
Party	Candidate	Votes	%	±%
Independent	Mark Smith	2,135	54.7	
Conservative	Michael Blair	1,595	40.9	
Conservative	Paul Duckett	1,564	40.1	
Conservative	Stephen Addy	1,542	39.5	
Green	Susan Clinch	1,193	30.6	
Liberal Democrats	Catherine Brown	967	24.8	New
Labour	Valerie Quinn	449	11.5	
Labour	Louise Chinnery	373	9.6	
Labour	Carmen Williams	263	6.7	
Turnout		3,930	38.3	
Registered electors		10,263		
Independent gain from Conservative				
Conservative hold				
Conservative hold				

=== Arlesey ===
Arlesey (3 seats)
Party	Candidate	Votes	%	±%
Conservative	Ian Dalgarno	1,899	54.9	
Conservative	David Shelvey	1,858	53.7	
Conservative	Richard Wenham	1,799	52.0	
Green	Tom Hoeksma	1,002	29.0	New
Labour	Kevin O'Daly	942	27.2	
Labour	Douglas Landman	884	25.6	
Labour	Daniel Riley	767	22.2	
Turnout		3,541	29.9	
Registered electors		11,824		
Conservative hold				
Conservative hold				
Conservative hold				

No UKIP (-20.7) or Independent (-16.4) candidates as previous.

=== Aspley and Woburn ===
Aspley and Woburn (1 seat)
Party	Candidate	Votes	%	±%
Independent	John Baker	1,686	78.5	New
Conservative	Christopher Wells	371	17.3	−55.9
Labour	Susan Morris	90	4.2	New
Majority				
Turnout		2,152	57.4	
Registered electors		3,748		
Independent gain from Conservative		Swing		

No Green candidate as previous (-26.8).

=== Barton-le-Clay ===
Barton-le-Clay (1 seat)
Party	Candidate	Votes	%	±%
Independent	Ian Shingler	1,155	68.6	+17.5
Conservative	Joseph Irwin	253	15.0	−10.6
Liberal Democrats	Jonathan Paxton	197	11.7	−2.3
Labour	Karl Bruckdorfer	78	4.6	−4.7
Majority				
Turnout		1,687	42.5	
Registered electors		3,967		
Independent hold		Swing		

=== Biggleswade North ===
Biggleswade North (2 seats)
Party	Candidate	Votes	%	±%
Conservative	Steven Watkins	1,161	57.1	
Conservative	Ian Bond	1,098	54.0	
Labour	Sarah Doyle	783	38.5	
Labour	Fiona Factor	738	36.3	
Turnout		2,103	29.0	
Registered electors		7,252		
Conservative hold				
Conservative hold				

No UKIP (-23.6) or Green (-11.0) candidates as previous.

=== Biggleswade South ===
Biggleswade South (2 seats)
Party	Candidate	Votes	%	±%
Conservative	Mark Foster	1,180	39.8	
Independent	Hayley Whitaker	1,072	36.1	New
Conservative	Michael North	969	32.7	
Labour	Georgina Gale	602	20.3	
Labour	Julian Vaughan	588	19.8	
Independent	Timothy Woodward	577	19.5	
UKIP	Duncan Strachan	453	15.2	
Turnout		2,981	34.4	
Registered electors		8,656		
Conservative hold				
Independent gain from Conservative				

No Independent (-12.1) or Green (-10.0) candidates as previous.

=== Caddington ===
Caddington (2 seats)
Party	Candidate	Votes	%	±%
Conservative	Kevin Collins	1,418	48.5	
Conservative	Edward Perry	1,256	43.0	
Independent	John Waller	1,041	35.6	New
Labour	Shirley Smith	551	18.9	
Labour	Ian Lowery	445	15.2	
Turnout		2,955	37.0	
Registered electors		7,440		
Conservative hold				
Conservative hold				

No Independent (-22.4) or Green (-9.1) candidates as previous.

=== Cranfield and Marston Moretaine ===
Cranfield and Marston Moretaine (3 seats)
Party	Candidate	Votes	%	±%
Conservative	Susan Clark	1,508	45.3	
Conservative	Kenneth Matthews	1,285	38.6	
Conservative	Robert Morris	1,183	35.5	
Independent	John Guinn	1,042	31.3	New
Green	Alison Parker	772	23.2	
UKIP	Roger Baker	695	20.9	
Labour	Elizabeth Rooney	630	18.9	
Labour	Michelle White	507	15.2	
Labour	Karl O'Dell	435	13.1	
Renew	Alan Victor	241	7.2	New
Turnout		3,340	30.7	
Registered electors		10,888		
Conservative hold				
Conservative hold				
Conservative hold				

=== Dunstable Central ===
Dunstable Central (1 seat)
Party	Candidate	Votes	%	±%
Conservative	Carole Hegley	573	54.5	+1.8
Labour	Russell McCulloch	290	27.6	−3.0
Liberal Democrats	David Jones	188	17.9	New
Majority				
Turnout		1,088	29.5	
Registered electors		3,683		
Conservative hold		Swing		

No Independent candidate as previous (-16.7).

=== Dunstable Icknield ===
Dunstable Icknield (2 seats)
Party	Candidate	Votes	%	±%
Conservative	John Chatterley	641	35.3	
Conservative	David McVicar	599	33.0	
Independent	Kayson Gurney	593	32.7	
Independent	Kenson Gurney	516	28.4	
Labour	Catherine Howes	442	24.4	
Labour	Michael Rogers	378	20.8	
Liberal Democrats	Susan Thorne	145	8.0	
Liberal Democrats	Richard Hunt	142	7.8	
Turnout		1,837	29.0	
Registered electors		6,334		
Conservative hold				
Conservative hold				

=== Dunstable Manshead ===
Dunstable Manshead (1 seat)
Party	Candidate	Votes	%	±%
Conservative	Philip Crawley	436	38.9	
Labour	Louise O'Riordan	337	30.0	
UKIP	Robert Brown	189	16.8	
Liberal Democrats	Patricia Larkman	160	14.3	
Majority				
Turnout		1,131	27.3	
Registered electors		4,148		
Conservative hold		Swing		

=== Dunstable Northfields ===
Dunstable Northfields (2 seats)
Party	Candidate	Votes	%	±%
Conservative	Johnson Tamara	689	37.9	
Conservative	Gladys Sanders	655	36.0	
Labour	Kevin Flint	607	33.4	
Labour	Julian Mockridge	606	33.3	
UKIP	Martin Young	354	19.5	
Liberal Democrats	Elaine Morgan	232	12.7	
Liberal Democrats	Lynda Walmsley	218	12.0	
Turnout		1,835	24.3	
Registered electors		7,567		
Conservative hold				
Conservative hold				

=== Dunstable Watling ===
Dunstable Watling (2 seats)
Party	Candidate	Votes	%	±%
Conservative	Eugene Ghent	1,304	56.3	
Conservative	John Young	1,295	55.9	
Labour	Roger Pepworth	477	20.6	
Labour	Trudi Kleanthous	471	20.3	
UKIP	Steven Ashby	388	16.8	
Liberal Democrats	Ian Witherick	297	12.8	
Turnout		2,343	31.2	
Registered electors		7,509		
Conservative hold				
Conservative hold				

=== Eaton Bray ===
Eaton Bray (1 seat)
Party	Candidate	Votes	%	±%
Conservative	Philip Spicer	786	68.8	
Green	Andrew Waters	265	23.2	
Labour	Marc Windmill	91	8.0	
Majority				
Turnout		1,172	34.8	
Registered electors		3,368		
Conservative hold		Swing		

=== Flitwick ===
Flitwick (3 seats)
Party	Candidate	Votes	%	±%
Conservative	Neil Bunyan	1,466	41.1	
Independent	Gareth Mackey	1,397	39.2	
Conservative	Charles Gomm	1,187	33.3	
Conservative	Catherine Chapman	1,120	31.4	
UKIP	Russell Shaw	615	17.2	
Labour	Cathrine Jones	603	16.9	
Labour	Tania Malkani	566	15.9	
Liberal Democrats	Jack Moore	551	15.5	
Labour	Dan Toinko	543	15.2	
Liberal Democrats	Richard Kennedy	529	14.8	
Liberal Democrats	John White	488	13.7	
Turnout		3,588	34.0	
Registered electors		10,542		
Conservative hold				
Independent gain from Conservative				
Conservative hold				

=== Heath and Reach ===
Heath and Reach (1 seat)
Party	Candidate	Votes	%	±%
Conservative	Mark Versallion	1,018	75.2	
Green	Dominic Scholfield	205	15.1	
Labour	Susan Wellstood-Eason	131	9.7	
Majority				
Turnout		1,373	40.1	
Registered electors		3,427		
Conservative hold		Swing		

=== Houghton Conquest and Haynes ===
Houghton Conquest and Haynes (1 seat)
Party	Candidate	Votes	%	±%
Independent	Rebecca Hares	383	42.0	
Conservative	Martin Hawkins	311	34.1	
Independent	Richard James	111	12.2	
Labour	David Short	107	11.7	
Majority				
Turnout		917	39.2	
Registered electors		2,339		
Independent gain from Conservative		Swing		

=== Houghton Hall ===
Houghton Hall (2 seats)
Party	Candidate	Votes	%	±%
Liberal Democrats	Susan Goodchild	825	50.3	
Liberal Democrats	Yvonne Farrell	630	38.4	
Labour	Jack Butler	334	20.4	
UKIP	Joe Angell	321	19.6	
Conservative	John Kane	289	17.6	
Labour	Ian Purvis	277	16.9	
Independent	James Carroll	210	12.8	
Turnout		1,647	25.5	
Registered electors		6,457		
Liberal Democrats hold				
Liberal Democrats gain from Conservative				

=== Leighton Buzzard North ===
Leighton Buzzard North (3 seats)
Party	Candidate	Votes	%	±%
Conservative	Brian Spurr	1,341	39.4	
Conservative	Kenneth Ferguson	1,294	38.1	
Conservative	Ewan Wallace	1,135	33.4	
Labour	Michael Bishop	843	24.8	
Labour	Daniel Scott	744	21.9	
Labour	Christie Melon	689	20.3	
Liberal Democrats	Christopher Feander	633	18.6	
Liberal Democrats	Anne Gray	619	18.2	
Liberal Democrats	Rosalind Mennie	578	17.0	
UKIP	Andrew Dore	462	13.6	
UKIP	Caroline Redwood	461	13.6	
UKIP	Michael Woodhouse	399	11.7	
Women's Equality	Nanci Hogan	274	8.1	
Turnout		3,431	30.0	
Registered electors		11,071		
Conservative hold				
Conservative hold				
Conservative hold				

=== Leighton Buzzard South ===
Leighton Buzzard South (3 seats)
Party	Candidate	Votes	%	±%
Conservative	Amanda Dodwell	1,445	47.9	
Conservative	Raymond Berry	1,279	42.4	
Conservative	David Bowater	1,276	42.3	
Labour	Adrian Heffernan	674	22.3	
Labour	Christopher Northedge	624	20.7	
Labour	Robert Connelly	622	20.6	
Liberal Democrats	Anne Guess	566	18.8	
Liberal Democrats	Christopher Leaman	484	16.0	
Liberal Democrats	John Hewitt	482	16.0	
UKIP	Frank Lelliott	367	12.2	
UKIP	Antonio Vitiello	344	11.4	
UKIP	Steven Wildman	322	10.7	
Turnout		3,035	29.0	
Registered electors		10,457		
Conservative hold				
Conservative hold				
Conservative hold				

=== Linslade ===
Linslade (3 seats)
Party	Candidate	Votes	%	±%
Independent	Victoria Harvey	1,347	35.9	
Conservative	Gordon Perham	1,222	32.6	
Liberal Democrats	Peter Snelling	1,139	30.3	
Conservative	Stephen Jones	1,076	28.7	
Conservative	Anthony Morris	1,013	27.0	
Liberal Democrats	Russell Goodchild	911	24.3	
Liberal Democrats	Nigel Carnell	874	23.3	
Independent	Susan James	779	20.8	
Labour	Christine Sheppard	665	17.7	
Labour	Jane Woodman	560	14.9	
Independent	Roy Walker	447	11.9	
Labour	Isaac Sibiya	426	11.3	
Turnout		3,791	41.4	
Registered electors		9,152		
Independent gain from Conservative				
Conservative hold				
Liberal Democrats gain from Conservative				

=== Northill ===
Northill (1 seat)
Party	Candidate	Votes	%	±%
Conservative	Frank Firth	972	79.0	
Labour	Andrew Harland	259	21.0	
Majority				
Turnout		1,266	36.0	
Registered electors		3,514		
Conservative hold		Swing		

=== Parkside ===
Parkside (1 seat)
Party	Candidate	Votes	%	±%
Labour	Antonia Ryan	251	28.4	
Independent	Janet Cooper	196	22.1	
UKIP	Angela White	190	21.5	
Conservative	Alan Corkhill	136	15.4	
Liberal Democrats	Ray Morgan	85	9.6	
Green	Gillian Patrick	27	3.1	
Majority				
Turnout		892	25.2	
Registered electors		3,541		
Labour hold		Swing		

=== Potton ===
Potton (2 seats)
Party	Candidate	Votes	%	±%
Independent	Adam Zerny	2,729	85.8	
Independent	Tracey Wye	2,151	67.6	
Conservative	Doreen Gurney	440	13.8	
Conservative	Grant Fage	375	11.8	
Labour	Daniel Cherry	166	5.2	
Labour	Wendy Bater	102	3.2	
Turnout		3,192	50.1	
Registered electors		6,327		
Independent hold				
Independent gain from Conservative				

=== Sandy ===
Sandy (3 seats)
Party	Candidate	Votes	%	±%
Independent	Simon Ford	2,152	58.9	
Conservative	Caroline Maudlin	1,150	31.5	
Conservative	Tracey Stock	1,048	28.7	
Liberal Democrats	Peter Aldis	996	27.3	
Conservative	Peter Smith	860	23.5	
Green	Kenneth Lynch	711	19.5	
Liberal Democrats	Kevin Backhouse	478	13.1	
Labour	Alexandra Morris	317	8.7	
Labour	Richard Peters	280	7.7	
Liberal Democrats	Ben Gutteridge	271	7.4	
Labour	Orhan Tuncay	212	5.8	
Turnout		3,666	37.2	
Registered electors		9,868		
Independent gain from Conservative				
Conservative hold				
Conservative hold				

=== Shefford ===
Shefford (2 seats)
Party	Candidate	Votes	%	±%
Conservative	Anthony Brown	1,374	65.7	
Conservative	Mark Liddiard	1,368	65.4	
Labour	Glenda Tizard	643	30.7	
Labour	Sheila Woods	522	25.0	
Turnout		2,192	29.0	
Registered electors		7,570		
Conservative hold				
Conservative hold				

=== Silsoe and Shillington ===
Silsoe and Shillington (1 seat)
Party	Candidate	Votes	%	±%
Independent	Alison Graham	1,192	70.6	
Conservative	Blake Stephenson	384	22.7	
Labour	Sheila Gardner	112	6.6	
Majority				
Turnout		1,695	39.8	
Registered electors		4,260		
Independent hold		Swing		

=== Stotfold and Langford ===
Stotfold and Langford (3 seats)
Party	Candidate	Votes	%	±%
Conservative	Alan Saunders	1,874	52.2	
Conservative	Steven Dixon	1,753	48.8	
Conservative	Nicola Harris	1,636	45.6	
Labour	Helen Wightwick	1,044	29.1	
Labour	Nicholas Andrews	998	27.8	
Labour	Matthew Brennan	809	22.5	
UKIP	Paul Francis	775	21.6	
UKIP	Binanti Cuzner	630	17.6	
Turnout		3,644	31.6	
Registered electors		11,520		
Conservative hold				
Conservative hold				
Conservative hold				

=== Tithe Farm ===
Tithe Farm (1 seat)
Party	Candidate	Votes	%	±%
UKIP	Patrick Hamill	293	33.1	
Labour	Martin Kennedy	232	26.2	
Independent	Tracey McMahon	156	17.6	
Conservative	David Abbott	122	13.8	
Liberal Democrats	Kenneth Wattingham	60	6.8	
Green	Catherine Aganoglu	22	2.5	
Majority				
Turnout		901	28.0	
Registered electors		3,218		
UKIP gain from Labour		Swing		

=== Toddington ===
Toddington (2 seats)
Party	Candidate	Votes	%	±%
Independent	Silvia Amantea-Collins	1,557	51.9	
Independent	Mary Walsh	1,289	43.0	
Conservative	Thomas Nicols	806	26.9	
Conservative	Gary Tubb	583	19.4	
Labour	Rhiannon Meades	459	15.3	
Labour	Barry James	368	12.3	
UKIP	Richard Roe	338	11.3	
Turnout		3,013	40.2	
Registered electors		7,496		
Independent gain from Conservative				
Independent gain from Conservative				

=== Westoning, Flitton and Greenfield ===
Westoning, Flitton and Greenfield (1 seat)
Party	Candidate	Votes	%	±%
Conservative	James Jamieson	1,105	71.3	
Green	Richard Ellis	343	22.1	
Labour	Rachel Garnham	101	6.5	
Majority				
Turnout		1,568	42.8	
Registered electors		3,661		
Conservative hold		Swing		
