= 2015 Central Bedfordshire Council election =

2015 UK local government election

- 7 May 2015

All 59 seats to Central Bedfordshire Council 30 seats needed for a majority

	First party	Second party
Party	Conservative	Independent
Last election	49 seats, 53.6%	4 seats, 8.1%
Seats won	53	3
Seat change	▲4	▼1
Popular vote	138,953	26,814
Percentage	53.8%	10.4%
Swing	▲0.2%	▲2.3%
	Third party	Fourth party
Party	Labour	Liberal Democrats
Last election	1 seat, 22.2%	5 seats, 14.3%
Seats won	2	1
Seat change	▲1	▼4
Popular vote	43,512	13,232
Percentage	16.8%	5.1%
Swing	▼5.4%	▼9.2%
- Winner of each seat at the 2015 Central Bedfordshire Council election
Council control before election
Conservative
Council control after election
Conservative

Elections to Central Bedfordshire Council were held on 7 May 2015, along with the 2015 United Kingdom general election and other local elections. The whole council was up for election, with each successful candidate serving a four-year term of office, expiring in 2019.

The Conservative Party retained overall control of the council, winning 53 of the 59 seats on the council. Of the remaining 6 seats, 3 were won by Independents, 2 by the Labour Party and 1 by the Liberal Democrats.

== Results summary ==
Central Bedfordshire Council Election Result 2015
Party	Seats	Gains	Losses	Net gain/loss	Seats %	Votes %	Votes	+/−
Conservative	53	5	1	+4	89.83	53.78	138,953	+0.17
Independent	3	1	2	-1	5.08	10.38	26,814	+2.33
Labour	2	2	1	+1	3.39	16.84	43,512	-5.39
Liberal Democrats	1	0	4	-4	1.70	5.12	13,232	-9.24
UKIP	0	0	0	0	0.00	8.22	21,253	+7.50
Green	0	0	0	0	0.00	5.66	14,625	+4.63

The overall turnout was 66.37% with a total of 258,389 valid votes cast. A total of 1,085 ballots were rejected in the 25 wards in which the number of rejected votes was reported.

== Council composition ==
Following the 2011 election, the composition of the council was:

↓
49	5	4	1
Conservative	LD	I	L

After the election, the composition of the council was:

↓
53	3	2	1
Conservative	I	L	LD

I - Independent
L - Labour
LD - Liberal Democrats

== Ward results ==
Asterisks denote incumbent Councillors seeking re-election. Councillors seeking re-election were elected in 2011, and results are compared to that year's polls on that basis. All results are listed below:

=== Ampthill ===
Ampthill (3 seats)
Party	Candidate	Votes	%	±%
Conservative	Mike Blair*	3,921	24.27	+1.42
Conservative	Paul Alan Duckett*	3,753	23.23	−2.19
Conservative	Paul Raymond Downing	2,899	19.95	−2.22
Independent	Mark Andrew Smith*	2,378	14.72	−8.18
Green	Susan Heather Clinch	1,739	10.76	
Labour	Peter Joyce	1,465	9.07	+0.41
Majority		521	3.23	
Turnout		16,155	73.00	+24.90
Conservative hold		Swing		
Conservative gain from Independent		Swing		
Conservative hold		Swing		

A total of 123 ballots were rejected.

=== Arlesey ===
Arlesey
Party	Candidate	Votes	%	±%
Conservative	Ian Dalgarno*	3,977	22.08	+0.18
Conservative	David Shelvey	3,677	20.42	−2.67
Conservative	Richard David Wenham*	3,321	18.44	−2.49
UKIP	Thomas Heeney	1,939	10.77	
Labour	David Charles Devereux	1,914	10.63	−1.28
Labour	Douglas Alexander Landman	1,649	9.15	−1.94
Independent	Robert David McGregor	1,532	8.51	
Majority		1,382	7.67	
Turnout		18,009	69.00	+28.00
Conservative hold		Swing		
Conservative hold		Swing		
Conservative hold		Swing		

A total of 84 ballots were rejected.

=== Aspley and Woburn ===
Aspley and Woburn (1 seat)
Party	Candidate	Votes	%	±%
Conservative	Budge Wells	2,012	73.24	−2.08
Green	Robin Alexander Harewood-Lee	735	26.76	
Majority		1,277	46.48	
Turnout		2,747	74.00	+27.40
Conservative hold		Swing		

A total of 33 ballots were rejected.

=== Barton-Le-Clay ===
Barton-Le-Clay (1 seat)
Party	Candidate	Votes	%	±%
Independent	Ian Leslie Shingler*	1,518	51.13	+19.22
Conservative	Gareth Mackey	759	25.56	+4.49
Liberal Democrats	Janet Ann Nunn	417	14.05	−9.61
Labour	Lesley Ann Lodge	275	9.26	+2.15
Majority		759	25.57	
Turnout		2,969	74.00	+25.20
Independent hold		Swing		

A total of 13 ballots were rejected.

=== Biggleswade North ===
Biggleswade North (2 seats)
Party	Candidate	Votes	%	±%
Conservative	Maurice Richard Jones*	1,594	25.27	−1.57
Conservative	Jane Gay Wimberley Lawrence*	1,472	23.33	−3.75
Labour	Pete Biernis	977	15.49	−6.60
UKIP	Frank Foster	925	14.66	
Labour	Bernard Victor Briars	910	14.43	−9.56
Green	Amy-Jane Peabody	430	6.82	
Majority		495	7.84	
Turnout		6,308	63.00	+24.80
Conservative hold		Swing		
Conservative hold		Swing		

A total of 36 ballots were rejected.

=== Biggleswade South ===
Biggleswade South (2 seats)
Party	Candidate	Votes	%	±%
Conservative	David John Lawrence*	2,575	28.27	−2.19
Conservative	Tim Woodward	1,982	21.76	−7.85
Conservative	David William Frank Albone	1,246	13.68	
UKIP	Duncan Anthony Strachan	1,209	13.27	
Independent	Bernard John Rix	779	8.55	
Labour	Satinderjit Singh Dhaliwal	672	7.38	−13.32
Green	Andrew Richard Peabody	646	7.09	
Majority		736	8.08	
Turnout		9,109	67.00	+25.30
Conservative hold		Swing		
Conservative hold		Swing		

A total of 25 ballots were rejected.

=== Caddington ===
Caddington (2 seats)
Party	Candidate	Votes	%	±%
Conservative	Kevin Mark Collins	2,888	29.48	−6.83
Conservative	Richard Charles Stay*	2,740	27.97	−7.01
Labour	Ian Guy Lowery	733	7.48	−4.17
Labour	Shirley Jean Smith	666	6.80	−0.15
Independent	Patrick Brian Smith	615	6.28	
Independent	Chrystna Yvonne Smith	495	5.05	
Green	Matt Ogier-Russell	478	4.88	
Majority		1,559	15.91	
Turnout		9,796	72.00	+24.80
Conservative hold		Swing		
Conservative hold		Swing		

A total of 46 ballots were rejected.

=== Cranfield & Marston Moretaine ===
Cranfield & Marston Moretaine (3 seats)
Party	Candidate	Votes	%	±%
Conservative	Sue Clark*	3,381	22.00	+4.12
Conservative	Ken Matthews*	2,977	19.37	+2.56
Conservative	Robert William Morris	2,765	17.99	+0.73
UKIP	Roger Baker	1,958	12.74	
Labour	Elizabeth Margaret Rooney	1,208	7.86	+0.15
Labour	Alan Joseph Morris	1,156	7.52	−0.12
Labour	Andrew Shaw	1,093	7.11	−0.21
Green	Alison Heather Parker	831	5.41	
Majority		807	5.25	
Turnout		15,369	67.00	+27.80
Conservative hold		Swing		
Conservative hold		Swing		
Conservative hold		Swing		

A total of 24 ballots were rejected.

=== Dunstable Central ===
Dunstable Central (1 seat)
Party	Candidate	Votes	%	±%
Conservative	Carole Hegley*	1,162	52.70	−11.94
Labour	Theresa Moira Miller	674	30.57	+7.53
Independent	Ian Phillip Bunker	369	16.73	
Majority		488	22.13	
Turnout		2,205	63.00	+24.00
Conservative hold		Swing		

The number of ballots rejected was not reported by the council.

=== Dunstable Icknield ===
Dunstable Icknield (2 seats)
Party	Candidate	Votes	%	±%
Conservative	David John McVicar*	2,062	31.61	+7.84
Conservative	John Anthony Chatterley	1,975	30.28	+9.64
Labour	Catherine Theresa Howes	980	15.02	−0.41
Labour	Michael Aneurin Stokes	874	13.40	−1.45
Independent	Christine Ann Reynolds	632	9.69	
Majority		995	15.26	
Turnout		6,523	63.00	+28.60
Conservative hold		Swing		
Conservative hold		Swing		

The number of ballots rejected was not reported by the council.

=== Dunstable Manshead ===
Dunstable Manshead (1 seat)
Party	Candidate	Votes	%	±%
Conservative	Eugene Patrick Ghent	879	39.05	−3.42
Independent	Neal Reynolds	697	30.96	
Labour	Roger Barry Pepworth	675	29.99	−12.99
Majority		182	8.09	
Turnout		2,251	59.00	+21.80
Conservative gain from Labour		Swing		

A total of 41 ballots were rejected.

=== Dunstable Northfields ===
Dunstable Northfields (2 seats)
Party	Candidate	Votes	%	±%
Conservative	Jeannette Freeman	1,806	23.21	+4.96
Conservative	Nigel Austin Warren	1,436	18.45	+0.11
Independent	Julian David Murray*	1,063	13.66	−7.59
Labour	Michael Andrew Rogers	1,027	13.20	−1.78
Independent	Bev Coleman	933	11.99	
Labour	Robert Leslie Shelley	773	9.93	−4.46
Green	Peter John Burrows	409	5.26	
Green	Catherine Joyce Aganoglu	335	4.30	
Majority		373	4.79	
Turnout		7,782	59.00	+22.40
Conservative gain from Independent		Swing		
Conservative hold		Swing		

The number of ballots rejected was not reported by the council.

=== Dunstable Watling ===
Dunstable Watling (2 seats)
Party	Candidate	Votes	%	±%
Conservative	Peter Nugent Hollick*	3,135	32.88	−1.47
Conservative	Nigel Young	3,097	32.48	−1.01
Labour	Michael Rolfe Ingham	994	10.42	−1.55
Labour	Sheila Morgan	966	10.13	−1.68
Independent	Beryl Mary Meakins	750	7.86	
Independent	Alan Gerard Corkhill	594	6.23	
Majority		38	0.40	
Turnout		9,536	69.00	+27.20
Conservative hold		Swing		
Conservative hold		Swing		

The number of ballots rejected was not reported by the council.

=== Eaton Bray ===
Eaton Bray (1 seat)
Party	Candidate	Votes	%	±%
Conservative	Ken Janes	1,225	50.83	−24.17
Independent	Ruth Archer	943	39.13	
Labour	Isaac Chikwakwanyi Sibiya	242	10.04	−9.16
Majority		282	11.70	
Turnout		2,410	72.00	+26.00
Conservative hold		Swing		

A total of 21 ballots were rejected.

=== Flitwick ===
Flitwick (3 seats)
Party	Candidate	Votes	%	±%
Conservative	Fiona Chapman	3,511	20.80	+6.12
Conservative	Andrew Michael Turner*	3,274	19.40	+1.94
Conservative	Charles Christopher Gomm*	2,762	16.36	+1.86
Labour	David William Austine Short	1,585	9.39	+1.90
UKIP	Adam Glen Larkins	1,522	9.02	
Labour	Sheila Gardner	1,514	8.97	+2.18
UKIP	Russell Edward Shaw	1,368	8.10	
Green	David Christian Parrock	1,344	7.96	+3.16
Majority		1,177	6.97	
Turnout		16,880	70.00	34.40
Conservative hold		Swing		
Conservative hold		Swing		
Conservative hold		Swing		

A total of 57 ballots were rejected.

=== Heath & Reach ===
Heath & Reach (1 seat)
Party	Candidate	Votes	%	±%
Conservative	Mark Anthony Gaius Versallion*			
Conservative hold		Swing		

Mark Versallion was re-elected unopposed.

=== Houghton Conquest & Haynes ===
Houghton Conquest & Haynes (1 seat)
Party	Candidate	Votes	%	±%
Conservative	Angela Barker*	1,137	67.56	
Labour	Paul Michael Forster	299	17.76	
Independent	Richard James	247	14.68	
Majority		838	49.80	
Turnout		1,683	77.00	N/A
Conservative hold		Swing		

A total of 22 ballots were rejected.

=== Houghton Hall ===
Houghton Hall (2 seats)
Party	Candidate	Votes	%	±%
Conservative	John Robert Kane	1,336	24.44	+7.69
Liberal Democrats	Susan Anne Goodchild*	1,250	22.87	−2.25
Liberal Democrats	Laura Jane Mary Ellaway	874	15.99	−4.52
Labour	Chris Slough	806	14.74	+2.15
Labour	Syed Qaiser Abbas	700	12.81	+0.84
Green	Steve Finan	500	9.15	
Majority		376	6.88	
Turnout		5,466	56.00	+23.90
Conservative gain from Liberal Democrats		Swing		
Liberal Democrats hold		Swing		

A total of 65 ballots were rejected.

=== Leighton Buzzard North ===
Leighton Buzzard North (3 seats)
Party	Candidate	Votes	%	±%
Conservative	Ken Ferguson	3,663	19.56	+2.08
Conservative	Brian John Spurr*	3,640	19.44	+0.88
Conservative	Roy William Johnstone*	3,509	18.74	−0.56
Labour	Michael John Bishop	1,614	8.62	−0.92
Labour	Daniel Scott	1,438	7.68	−0.52
Labour	Ian Michael Purvis	1,331	7.11	−2.42
Green	Jonathan Adrian Hull	737	3.94	
Liberal Democrats	Rosalind Mennie	734	3.92	−1.24
Green	Simon James Wilson	713	3.81	
Liberal Democrats	Alan Roger White	674	3.60	−2.80
Green	Gary Woodwards	671	3.58	
Majority		1,895	10.12	
Turnout		18,724	63.00	+26.10
Conservative hold		Swing		
Conservative hold		Swing		
Conservative hold		Swing		

A total of 102 ballots were rejected.

=== Leighton Buzzard South ===
Leighton Buzzard South (3 seats)
Party	Candidate	Votes	%	±%
Conservative	Amanda Louise Dodwell*	2,999	18.29	−1.20
Conservative	Dave Bowater*	2,862	17.46	−2.07
Conservative	Ray Berry*	2,823	17.22	−2.47
Labour	John Stephen Bone	1,302	7.94	−3.26
UKIP	Garry Lelliott	1,163	7.09	
Labour	Adrian Peter Heffernan	1,046	6.38	
Labour	Christopher Phillip Earnshaw Northedge	929	5.67	−3.92
Liberal Democrats	Anne Elizabeth Gray	559	3.41	−3.66
Green	Nichola Lynne Cheesewright	543	3.31	
Liberal Democrats	Anne Jennifer Guess	481	2.93	−3.89
Green	Emily Anne Lawrence	474	2.89	
Liberal Democrats	Celia Mary Snelling	452	2.76	−3.91
Independent	Paul Leslie Adams	401	2.45	
Green	Kenton Roger Charles Sumner	361	2.20	
Majority		137	0.83	
Turnout		16,395	64.00	+28.00
Conservative hold		Swing		
Conservative hold		Swing		
Conservative hold		Swing		

A total of 73 ballots were rejected.

=== Linslade ===
Linslade (3 seats)
Party	Candidate	Votes	%	±%
Conservative	Gordon Perham	2,935	16.14	−1.16
Conservative	Gary David Tubb	2,814	15.48	+2.56
Conservative	Benjamin Mark Ian Walker	2,418	13.30	+1.18
Liberal Democrats	Peter John Snelling	1,333	7.33	−4.65
Labour	Peter William Palfrey	1,068	5.87	−1.00
Liberal Democrats	Russ Goodchild	1,027	5.65	−4.02
Labour	Rebekah Price	972	5.35	−0.48
Liberal Democrats	Nigel Kenneth Carnell	958	5.27	−6.31
UKIP	Ian Thomas Reynolds	930	5.11	
Labour	Gerald Alfred Sandison	914	5.03	−0.37
Green	Ken Barry	834	4.59	−1.24
UKIP	Mike Woodhouse	770	4.24	
Green	Parisa Francesca Rosina Darling	667	3.67	
Green	Tony Mabbott	541	2.97	
Majority		121	0.66	
Turnout		18,181	71.00	+25.00
Conservative hold		Swing		
Conservative hold		Swing		
Conservative hold		Swing		

A total of 71 ballots were rejected.

=== Northill ===
Northill (1 seat)
Party	Candidate	Votes	%	±%
Conservative	Frank Wray Firth	932	61.39	−6.92
UKIP	Paul Goodchild	331	21.81	
Labour	Peter Heyes	255	16.80	+0.23
Majority		601	39.58	
Turnout		1,518	43.00	−7.90
Conservative hold		Swing		

A total of 14 ballots were rejected.

=== Parkside ===
Parkside (1 seat)
Party	Candidate	Votes	%	±%
Labour	Antonia Petra Ryan	510	26.87	+5.92
Independent	Alan David Winter	486	25.61	
UKIP	Stephen John North	387	20.39	
Conservative	Adam Fahn	384	20.23	
Independent	Jimmy Carroll	131	6.90	
Majority		24	1.26	
Turnout		1,898	53.00	+22.90
Labour gain from Liberal Democrats		Swing		

A total of 13 ballots were rejected.

=== Potton ===
Potton (2 seats)
Party	Candidate	Votes	%	±%
Independent	Adam Zerny*	3,059	47.35	+10.93
Conservative	Doreen Beatrice Gurney*	1,384	21.42	−2.62
Conservative	Allan Mathieson Drew	1,223	18.93	−3.35
Labour	Adam John Dutton	795	12.30	+3.07
Majority		161	2.49	
Turnout		6,461	73.00	+22.60
Independent hold		Swing		
Conservative hold		Swing		

A total of 33 ballots were rejected.

=== Sandy ===
Sandy (3 seats)
Party	Candidate	Votes	%	±%
Conservative	Caroline Mauldin*	2,798	16.43	−0.41
Conservative	Tracey Deborah Stock	2,332	13.69	−2.62
Conservative	Peter Lindsay Smith	2,294	13.47	+1.40
Liberal Democrats	Nigel Aldis	1,378	8.09	−4.73
UKIP	Christopher Butterfield	1,286	7.55	
UKIP	George Konstantinidis	1,087	6.38	+0.17
UKIP	Peter Edwin Day	1,081	6.35	
Labour	Cheryl Ann McDonald	1,055	6.20	−0.20
Independent	Ken Lynch	1,018	5.98	
Labour	Tom Noakes	849	4.99	−1.48
Liberal Democrats	Jafor Ali	723	4.25	−4.50
Independent	Stephen Robert Laurie Allen	572	3.36	−3.10
Liberal Democrats	Gee Leach	555	3.26	−4.41
Majority		916	5.38	
Turnout		17,028	64.00	+26.50
Conservative hold		Swing		
Conservative hold		Swing		
Conservative gain from Liberal Democrats		Swing		

A total of 37 ballots were rejected.

=== Shefford ===
Shefford (2 seats)
Party	Candidate	Votes	%	±%
Conservative	Lewis Birt*	2,734	32.14	+1.57
Conservative	Tony Brown*	2,630	30.92	+1.55
Labour	Nigel Ian Rushby	1,176	13.83	+2.29
UKIP	Jonathan Shilton	1,030	12.11	+3.39
UKIP	Roger Martin Smith	936	11.00	
Majority		1,454	17.09	
Turnout		8,506	69.00	+27.50
Conservative hold		Swing		
Conservative hold		Swing		

A total of 31 ballots were rejected.

=== Silsoe & Shillington ===
Silsoe & Shillington (1 seat)
Party	Candidate	Votes	%	±%
Independent	Alison Mary Wainman Graham	1,394	45.98	
Conservative	Ian Jeremy Knighton	1,276	42.08	−4.14
Labour	Keith Richard Whitwell	362	11.94	+5.57
Majority		118	3.90	
Turnout		3,032	75.00	+23.50
Independent gain from Conservative		Swing		

A total of 23 ballots were rejected.

=== Stotfold & Langford ===
Stotfold & Langford (3 seats)
Party	Candidate	Votes	%	±%
Conservative	Brian Saunders	3,750	21.25	+3.11
Conservative	John Alfred George Saunders*	3,261	18.48	+0.87
Conservative	Steven Ian Graham Dixon	3,205	18.16	+1.35
UKIP	Roy Mitchell	1,667	9.44	
Labour	Lucy Kelly	1,570	8.90	+2.71
Independent	Alan Reginald Cooper	1,539	8.72	
Independent	Larry Stoter	1,484	8.41	
Green	Craig Thomas	1,172	6.64	
Majority		1,538	8.72	
Turnout		17,648	69.00	+22.90
Conservative hold		Swing		
Conservative hold		Swing		
Conservative hold		Swing		

A total of 38 ballots were rejected.

=== Tithe Farm ===
Tithe Farm (1 seat)
Party	Candidate	Votes	%	±%
Labour	Tony Swain	522	30.58	−14.80
Conservative	Tony Morris	485	28.41	
Independent	David Abbott	288	16.87	
Liberal Democrats	Marion Frances Rolfe	230	13.48	−41.14
Independent	Tracey Karen McMahon	182	10.66	
Majority		37	2.17	
Turnout		1,707	55.00	+22.90
Labour gain from Liberal Democrats		Swing		

A total of 34 ballots were rejected.

=== Toddington ===
Toddington (2 seats)
Party	Candidate	Votes	%	±%
Conservative	Norman Bryan Costin*	2,391	25.82	+0.54
Conservative	Thomas Nicols*	1,616	17.45	−9.58
UKIP	Richard Roe	1,154	12.46	
Liberal Democrats	Brian James Golby	982	10.61	−5.38
Labour	Rachel Joy Elizabeth Garnham	977	10.55	−0.31
Independent	Mary Elizabeth Walsh	822	8.88	
Independent	Michael Stonnell	712	7.69	
Liberal Democrats	Linda Anne Jack	605	6.54	−4.43
Majority		462	4.99	
Turnout		9,259	71.00	+26.70
Conservative hold		Swing		
Conservative hold		Swing		

A total of 25 ballots were rejected.

=== Westoning, Flitton & Greenfield ===
Westoning, Flitton & Greenfield (1 seat)
Party	Candidate	Votes	%	±%
Conservative	James Gerard Jamieson*	1,859	65.60	5.76
UKIP	Steven David Wildman	510	17.99	
Green	James Malcolm Chalmers	465	16.41	−3.56
Majority		1,349	47.61	
Turnout		2,834	74.00	+25.90
Conservative hold		Swing		

The number of ballots rejected was not reported by the council.
