= 2009 Central Bedfordshire Council election =

2009 UK local government election

Central Bedfordshire Council Elections, 2009
- 4 June 2009

All 66 seats for whole Council
	First party	Second party	Third party
Party	Conservative	Liberal Democrats	Independent
Seats won	54, 81.8%	11, 16.7%	1, 1.5%
Popular vote	88,524	49,583	6,901
Percentage	51.67%	28.94%	4.03%
- Results of the 2009 Central Bedfordshire Council election
Elected Largest Party
Conservative

Elections to Central Bedfordshire Council were held on 4 June 2009. This was the first elections to the newly formed council, with all 66 seats being up for election, elected in wards that matched the previous County Council electoral divisions, but with twice as many councillors being elected in each. All Councillors elected would serve a two-year term, expiring in 2011, when ward boundaries would be reviewed. The Conservative Party won overall control of the council, managing to win 54 of 66 seats on the council.

== Result ==
Central Bedfordshire Council Election Result 2009
Party	Seats	Gains	Losses	Net gain/loss	Seats %	Votes %	Votes	+/−
Conservative	54	54	0	+54	81.82	51.67	88,524	N/A
Liberal Democrats	11	11	0	+11	16.67	28.94	49,583	N/A
Independent	1	1	0	+1	1.51	4.03	6,901	N/A
Labour	0	0	0	0	0.00	12.05	20,637	N/A
Green	0	0	0	0	0.00	1.52	2,612	N/A
BNP	0	0	0	0	0.00	1.29	2,215	N/A
UK First	0	0	0	0	0.00	0.50	856	N/A

The overall turnout was 40.59% with a total of 171,328 valid votes cast.

== Council Composition ==
After the election, the composition of the council was:

↓
54	11	1
Conservative	Lib Dem	I

I - Independent

== Ward results ==
=== Ampthill ===
Ampthill (2 seats)
Party	Candidate	Votes	%	±%
Liberal Democrats	Gary Summerfield	971	19.39	
Conservative	Paul Alan Duckett	855	17.07	
Independent	Mark Andrew Smith	840	16.77	
Conservative	Mrs C M E Gibson	633	12.64	
Independent	Ghislain Pascal	548	10.94	
Liberal Democrats	Michael John Cottier	418	8.35	
Independent	Chris Hayes	417	8.33	
Independent	John Bingham	177	3.53	
Labour	David Edwin Hogan	76	1.52	
Labour	Mark Richard Cant	73	1.46	
Majority		15	0.30	
Turnout		5,008	48.8	
Liberal Democrats win (new seat)				
Conservative win (new seat)				

=== Barton ===
Barton (2 Seats)
Party	Candidate	Votes	%	±%
Liberal Democrats	Tony Northwood	1,302	27.31	
Liberal Democrats	Janet Nunn	1,268	26.60	
Conservative	Martin Hawkins	1,000	20.98	
Conservative	Frederick James Wilson	898	18.84	
Labour	Terri Miller	157	3.29	
Labour	Christopher Atkinson	142	2.98	
Majority		268	5.62	
Turnout		4,767	44.20	
Liberal Democrats win (new seat)				
Liberal Democrats win (new seat)				

=== Biggleswade ===
Biggleswade (4 seats)
Party	Candidate	Votes	%	±%
Conservative	Peter Frank Vickers	2,157	13.84	
Conservative	Maurice R Jones	2,091	13.42	
Conservative	David John Lawrence	1,989	12.76	
Conservative	Jane G Lawrence	1,930	12.38	
Liberal Democrats	Gregory Burke	1,060	6.80	
Labour	Bernard Victor Briars	963	6.18	
Labour	Rex Skinner	951	6.10	
Liberal Democrats	Neil Cliff	850	5.45	
Labour	Sheila Margaret Grayston	808	5.18	
Liberal Democrats	Dante Virgil Conning	726	4.66	
Labour	Allister James Dennis	714	4.58	
BNP	Kevin Austin	709	4.55	
Liberal Democrats	Chris Leslie	639	4.10	
Majority		870	5.58	
Turnout		15,587	37.60	
Conservative win (new seat)				
Conservative win (new seat)				
Conservative win (new seat)				
Conservative win (new seat)				

=== Cranfield ===
Cranfield (2 seats)
Party	Candidate	Votes	%	±%
Conservative	Kenneth Charles Matthews	858	30.41	
Conservative	Alan Richard Bastable	857	30.38	
Liberal Democrats	Sheila Booth	354	12.55	
Liberal Democrats	Malcolm Sinclair	305	10.81	
Labour	Laurence Alexander Pollock	229	8.12	
Labour	Alan Joseph Morris	218	7.73	
Majority		503	17.83	
Turnout		2,821	34.80	
Conservative win (new seat)				
Conservative win (new seat)				

=== Dunstable Downs ===
Dunstable Downs (4 seats)
Party	Candidate	Votes	%	±%
Conservative	Tony Green	2,011	14.23	
Conservative	Nigel Young	1,855	13.12	
Conservative	Paul Darryl Freeman	1,828	12.93	
Conservative	Carole Hegley	1,664	11.77	
UK First	Peter Arthur Cole	856	6.06	
Labour	Wendy Anne Bater	855	6.05	
Liberal Democrats	David William Larkman	799	5.65	
Liberal Democrats	Lesley Elizabeth Gates	775	5.48	
Liberal Democrats	Sally Frances Pointer	746	5.28	
Liberal Democrats	Ian Witherick	692	4.89	
Labour	Joy Amelia Shaw	557	3.94	
Labour	David King	556	3.93	
Labour	James Kenneth O’Neill	520	3.68	
BNP	Derek Esau Godfrey	423	2.99	
Majority		808	5.71	
Turnout		14,137	36.30	
Conservative win (new seat)				
Conservative win (new seat)				
Conservative win (new seat)				
Conservative win (new seat)				

=== Flitwick East ===
Flitwick East (2 seats)
Party	Candidate	Votes	%	±%
Conservative	James Gerard Jamieson	1,213	23.31	
Conservative	Andrew Michael Turner	1,140	21.91	
Green	Gareth Ellis	685	13.17	
Liberal Democrats	Stephen Mitchell	641	12.32	
Green	Chris Fryer	496	9.53	
Liberal Democrats	Les Thompson	475	9.13	
Independent	Andy Ausden	320	6.15	
Labour	Sheila Gardner	125	2.40	
Labour	Stephen John Hunt	108	2.08	
Majority		455	8.74	
Turnout		5,203	44.70	
Conservative win (new seat)				
Conservative win (new seat)				

=== Flitwick West ===
Flitwick West (2 seats)
Party	Candidate	Votes	%	±%
Conservative	Dennis Gale	1,365	30.12	
Conservative	Steve Male	1,361	30.03	
Liberal Democrats	Louise Watton	760	16.77	
Liberal Democrats	Richard Kennedy	698	15.40	
Labour	Peter Joyce	197	4.35	
Labour	Iain Stuart Matuaru	151	3.33	
Majority		601	13.26	
Turnout		4,532	42.50	
Conservative win (new seat)				
Conservative win (new seat)				

=== Grovebury ===
Grovebury (2 seats)
Party	Candidate	Votes	%	±%
Conservative	Raymond D Berry	1,052	28.04	
Conservative	Adam Fahn	1,028	27.41	
Liberal Democrats	Hugo Friffin-Jorgensen	504	13.44	
Liberal Democrats	Peter Aidan McMorrow	444	11.84	
Labour	Jenny Bone	398	10.61	
Labour	Chris Northedge	325	8.66	
Majority		524	13.97	
Turnout		3,751	30.40	
Conservative win (new seat)				
Conservative win (new seat)				

=== Houghton Regis ===
Houghton Regis (4 seats)
Party	Candidate	Votes	%	±%
Liberal Democrats	Susan Goodchild	1,877	16.11	
Liberal Democrats	Rita Egan	1,650	14.16	
Liberal Democrats	David John Jones	1,628	13.97	
Liberal Democrats	Peter Williams	1,553	13.32	
Conservative	John Anthony Chatterley	998	8.56	
Conservative	Claire Elizabeth Meakins-Jell	799	6.86	
Conservative	Peter Frederick Swaisland	746	6.40	
BNP	Steven Bridgeman	735	6.31	
Labour	Robert James Roche	482	4.14	
Labour	Ruth Harris-Small	463	3.97	
Labour	Roger Harold Turner	444	3.81	
Conservative	Beryl Mary Meakins	279	2.39	
Majority		555	4.76	
Turnout		11,654	31.40	
Liberal Democrats win (new seat)				
Liberal Democrats win (new seat)				
Liberal Democrats win (new seat)				
Liberal Democrats win (new seat)				

=== Icknield ===
Icknield (2 seats)
Party	Candidate	Votes	%	±%
Conservative	David John McVicar	1,046	30.35	
Conservative	John Robert Kane	913	26.50	
Liberal Democrats	Peter Frances Hatswell	487	14.13	
Liberal Democrats	Alan David Winter	405	11.75	
Labour	Catherine Howes	299	8.68	
Labour	Michelle Jayne Henderson	296	8.59	
Majority		426	12.37	
Turnout		3,446	36.60	
Conservative win (new seat)				
Conservative win (new seat)				

=== Langford & Henlow Village ===
Langford & Henlow Village (2 seats)
Party	Candidate	Votes	%	±%
Conservative	Tony A Rogers	1,783	33.47	
Conservative	Jon A E Clarke	1,681	31.56	
Liberal Democrats	Tim Troon	722	13.55	
Liberal Democrats	Trevor Barnes	589	11.06	
Labour	David Charles Devereux	295	5.54	
Labour	Ann Brown	257	4.82	
Majority		959	18.01	
Turnout		5,327	44.10	
Conservative win (new seat)				
Conservative win (new seat)				

=== Leighton Linslade Central ===
Leighton Linslade Central (4 seats)
Party	Candidate	Votes	%	±%
Conservative	Kenneth Sharer	1,769	12.94	
Conservative	Brian J Spurr	1,752	12.81	
Conservative	Roy W Johnstone	1,747	12.78	
Conservative	David Bowater	1,728	12.64	
Liberal Democrats	Mark Freeman	1,328	9.71	
Liberal Democrats	Russ Goodchild	1,165	8.52	
Liberal Democrats	Anne Jennifer Guess	1,145	8.37	
Liberal Democrats	Stephen Henry Martin Owen	1,039	7.60	
Labour	Sara Monissa Harris	517	3.78	
Labour	Joan Rampley	513	3.75	
Labour	John Stephen Bone	505	3.69	
Labour	Maurice Rampley	466	3.41	
Majority		400	2.93	
Turnout		13,674	33.90	
Conservative win (new seat)				
Conservative win (new seat)				
Conservative win (new seat)				
Conservative win (new seat)				

=== Marston ===
Marston (2 seats)
Party	Candidate	Votes	%	±%
Conservative	Roger A Baker	706	24.87	
Conservative	Mike Gibson	601	21.17	
Independent	Iain Clapman	553	19.48	
Liberal Democrats	Ian J Booth	486	17.12	
Liberal Democrats	Jo Sinclair	247	8.70	
Labour	Roy Arden	130	4.58	
Labour	Sean Patrick Walter Carolan	116	4.08	
Majority		48	3.70	
Turnout		2,839	36.50	
Conservative win (new seat)				
Conservative win (new seat)				

=== Maulden & Houghton Conquest ===
Maulden & Houghton Conquest (2 seats)
Party	Candidate	Votes	%	±%
Conservative	Angela Barker	1,430	27.59	
Conservative	Howard J Lockey	1,390	26.81	
Liberal Democrats	Roger Baines	907	17.50	
Liberal Democrats	Tracy Wilbur	853	16.45	
Green	Saqhib Ijthehad Ali	341	6.58	
Labour	George Henry Legate	135	2.60	
Labour	Peter Reginald Wicks	128	2.47	
Majority		483	9.31	
Turnout		5,184	48.80	
Conservative win (new seat)				
Conservative win (new seat)				

=== Northfields ===
Northfields (2 seats)
Party	Candidate	Votes	%	±%
Independent	Julian David Murray	755	20.82	
Conservative	Jeannette Freeman	618	17.04	
Conservative	Nigel Austin Warren	511	14.09	
Labour	Duncan Ross	480	13.23	
Labour	Michael Joseph Hearty	413	11.39	
BNP	Shelley Rose	348	9.59	
Liberal Democrats	Rod Keyes	258	7.11	
Liberal Democrats	Elaine Ann Morgan	244	6.73	
Majority		107	2.95	
Turnout		3,627	40.30	
Independent win (new seat)				
Conservative win (new seat)				

=== Northill & Blunham ===
Northill & Blunham (2 seats)
Party	Candidate	Votes	%	±%
Conservative	Caroline Maudlin	2,013	36.57	
Conservative	Patricia E Turner	1,823	33.11	
Liberal Democrats	James Blackburn	674	12.24	
Liberal Democrats	Gail Davis	645	11.72	
Labour	Hilary Janet Broderick	180	3.27	
Labour	Peter Charles Doland	170	3.09	
Majority		1,149	20.87	
Turnout		5,505	44.10	
Conservative win (new seat)				
Conservative win (new seat)				

=== Plantation ===
Plantation (2 seats)
Party	Candidate	Votes	%	±%
Conservative	Peter R Rawcliffe	1,290	32.17	
Conservative	Alan J Shadbolt	1,204	30.03	
Liberal Democrats	Anne Elizabeth Gray	519	12.94	
Liberal Democrats	Rosalind Mennie	458	11.42	
Labour	Maurice Blackman	279	6.96	
Labour	Gerry Sandison	260	6.48	
Majority		685	17.09	
Turnout		4,010	35.70	
Conservative win (new seat)				
Conservative win (new seat)				

=== Potton ===
Potton (2 seats)
Party	Candidate	Votes	%	±%
Conservative	Anita Lewis	1,232	28.95	
Conservative	Doreen B Gurney	1,156	27.16	
Independent	Richard Gilbert Baker	731	17.17	
Liberal Democrats	Patrick Jones	631	14.83	
Labour	Rose Forbes	298	7.00	
Labour	Dennis James	208	4.89	
Majority		425	9.99	
Turnout		4,256	41.60	
Conservative win (new seat)				
Conservative win (new seat)				

=== Sandy ===
Sandy (2 seats)
Party	Candidate	Votes	%	±%
Liberal Democrats	Peter Blaine	1,383	26.74	
Liberal Democrats	Nigel Aldis	1,209	23.38	
Green	Ken Lynch	748	14.46	
Conservative	Dawn Michele McNeil	689	13.32	
Conservative	Steven Watkins	619	11.97	
Green	Kate Layden	266	5.14	
Labour	Cheryl Ann McDonald	135	2.61	
Labour	David Ian Hadley	123	2.38	
Majority		461	8.92	
Turnout		5,172	40.40	
Liberal Democrats win (new seat)				
Liberal Democrats win (new seat)				

=== Shefford ===
Shefford (2 seats)
Party	Candidate	Votes	%	±%
Conservative	Lewis Birt	1,309	28.66	
Conservative	Tony Brown	1,234	27.01	
Liberal Democrats	Paul Francis John Mackin	881	19.29	
Liberal Democrats	John Henry Goode	650	14.23	
Labour	Carolyn Devereux	286	6.26	
Labour	Nigel Ian Rushby	208	4.55	
Majority		353	7.72	
Turnout		4,568	41.40	
Conservative win (new seat)				
Conservative win (new seat)				

=== Silsoe and Shillington ===
Silsoe and Shillington (2 seats)
Party	Candidate	Votes	%	±%
Conservative	Rita Jane Drinkwater	1,503	28.91	
Liberal Democrats	Alison M W Graham	1,226	23.58	
Conservative	Kathy Keen	1,163	22.37	
Liberal Democrats	Myles Collett Greenhalgh	1,089	20.95	
Labour	Paul Bouch	138	2.65	
Labour	Anthony Kent	80	1.54	
Majority		63	1.21	
Turnout		5,199	46.30	
Conservative win (new seat)				
Liberal Democrats win (new seat)				

=== South East Bedfordshire ===
South East Bedfordshire (2 seats)
Party	Candidate	Votes	%	±%
Conservative	Richard Stay	1,720	35.11	
Conservative	Ruth B Gammons	1,551	31.66	
Liberal Democrats	Stephen Goss	582	11.88	
Liberal Democrats	Adrees Latif	542	11.06	
Labour	Alyson Jane Read	292	5.96	
Labour	John George Smith	212	4.33	
Majority		969	19.78	
Turnout		4,899	43.40	
Conservative win (new seat)				
Conservative win (new seat)				

=== South West Bedfordshire ===
South West Bedfordshire (2 seats)
Party	Candidate	Votes	%	±%
Conservative	Ken James	1,744	39.97	
Conservative	Marion Mustoe	1,705	39.08	
Liberal Democrats	Jack Goodchild	499	11.44	
Labour	Roger Charles Croft	222	5.09	
Labour	Bill Amos	193	4.42	
Majority		1,206	27.64	
Turnout		4,363	44.90	
Conservative win (new seat)				
Conservative win (new seat)				

=== Southcott ===
Southcott (2 seats)
Party	Candidate	Votes	%	±%
Conservative	David John Hopkin	986	24.71	
Liberal Democrats	Peter J Snelling	858	21.50	
Conservative	George Edward Albert Rolfe	829	20.78	
Liberal Democrats	Mark Oliver Nathan Fried	591	14.81	
Green	Ken Barry	417	10.45	
Labour	Peter William Palfrey	189	4.74	
Labour	John Sydney Kenneth Raymond	120	3.01	
Majority		29	0.72	
Turnout		3,990	40.90	
Conservative win (new seat)				
Liberal Democrats win (new seat)				

=== Stotfold and Arlesey ===
Stotfold and Arlesey (4 seats)
Party	Candidate	Votes	%	±%
Conservative	John A G Saunders	2,139	15.03	
Conservative	John Street	2,131	14.97	
Conservative	Christina Turner	1,981	13.92	
Conservative	Ian Dalgarno	1,931	13.57	
Independent	Hugh Harper	1,073	7.54	
Liberal Democrats	Alan Reginald Cooper	958	6.73	
Independent	Vic Williams	915	6.43	
Liberal Democrats	Pam Manfield	802	5.63	
Liberal Democrats	Larry Stoter	743	5.22	
Labour	Sandra May Lunn	432	3.03	
Labour	Douglas A Landman	422	2.96	
Labour	Lorraine Jean Warwick	394	2.77	
Labour	Mike Smith	313	2.20	
Majority		858	6.03	
Turnout		14,234	38.10	
Conservative win (new seat)				
Conservative win (new seat)				
Conservative win (new seat)				
Conservative win (new seat)				

=== Toddington ===
Toddington (2 seats)
Party	Candidate	Votes	%	±%
Conservative	Tom Nicols	1,188	28.35	
Conservative	Norman B Costin	1,139	27.18	
Independent	Ian Leslie Shingler	677	16.15	
Independent	John Walter Gilbey	448	10.69	
Liberal Democrats	Ray Ross Morgan	223	5.32	
Liberal Democrats	Tony Swain	203	4.84	
Labour	Rodney Evan Richard Evans	166	3.96	
Labour	Marshall Miller	147	3.51	
Majority		462	11.03	
Turnout		4,191	44.60	
Conservative win (new seat)				
Conservative win (new seat)				

=== Watling ===
Watling (2 seats)
Party	Candidate	Votes	%	±%
Conservative	Peter N Hollick	1,267	32.65	
Conservative	Ann J Sparrow	1,265	32.60	
Liberal Democrats	Susan Christine Thorne	454	11.70	
Liberal Democrats	Lynda Margaret Walmsley	353	9.10	
Labour	Raymond Ian Harris	285	7.35	
Labour	Michael Andrew Rogers	256	6.60	
Majority		811	20.90	
Turnout		3,880	38.20	
Conservative win (new seat)				
Conservative win (new seat)				

=== Woburn & Harlington ===
Woburn & Harlington (2 seats)
Party	Candidate	Votes	%	±%
Conservative	Fiona Chapman	1,743	27.24	
Conservative	Budge Wells	1,688	26.39	
Liberal Democrats	Brian James Golby	1,332	20.82	
Liberal Democrats	Robert John Hallam	1,068	16.69	
Labour	Rachel Joy Elizabeth Garnham	304	4.75	
Labour	Susan Marie Morris	263	4.11	
Majority		356	5.57	
Turnout		6,398	46.10	
Conservative win (new seat)				
Conservative win (new seat)				
