= Stondon =

Civil parish in Bedfordshire, England

Coordinates: 52.003°N 0.318°W

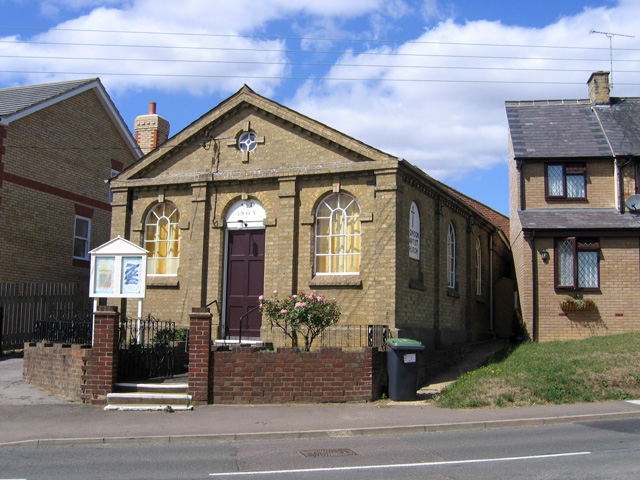
- The Baptist Chapel in Lower Stondon

- Location within Bedfordshire
- Population: 1,821 (2001); 2,295 (2011 Census including Henlow Camp)
- OS grid reference: TL1535
- Civil parish: Stondon
- Unitary authority: Central Bedfordshire
- Ceremonial county: Bedfordshire
- Region: East
- Country: England
- Sovereign state: United Kingdom
- Post town: HENLOW
- Postcode district: SG16
- Dialling code: 01462
- Police: Bedfordshire
- Fire: Bedfordshire
- Ambulance: East of England
- UK Parliament: Mid Bedfordshire

Stondon is a civil parish located in the Central Bedfordshire district of Bedfordshire, England. The parish includes the settlements of Lower Stondon and Upper Stondon.

The name derives from the Old English words stān and dūn, and means "stony hill". The parish itself however was only created in 1985 after an amalgamation of the Lower and Upper Stondon civil parishes.

Stondon is mentioned in the Domesday Book. The entry is as follows: Standone: St Benedict's of Ramsey; Engelhere from Azelina, Ralph Tailbois' wife.

Its services consist of a golf club and bistro, several hairdressers, Stondon Lower School and more.

The former Stondon Transport Museum closed permanently on 6 April 2015, and the greyhound racing track in Stondon closed permanently on 21 January 2024.

== Education ==
Stondon Lower School is in the village.

It is in the catchment zone for Robert Bloomfield Academy. It is also in the catchment zone for Samuel Whitbread Academy, which has an upper school and sixth form.
