= Lower Stondon =

Village in Bedfordshire, England

Coordinates: 52.005929°N 0.318746°W

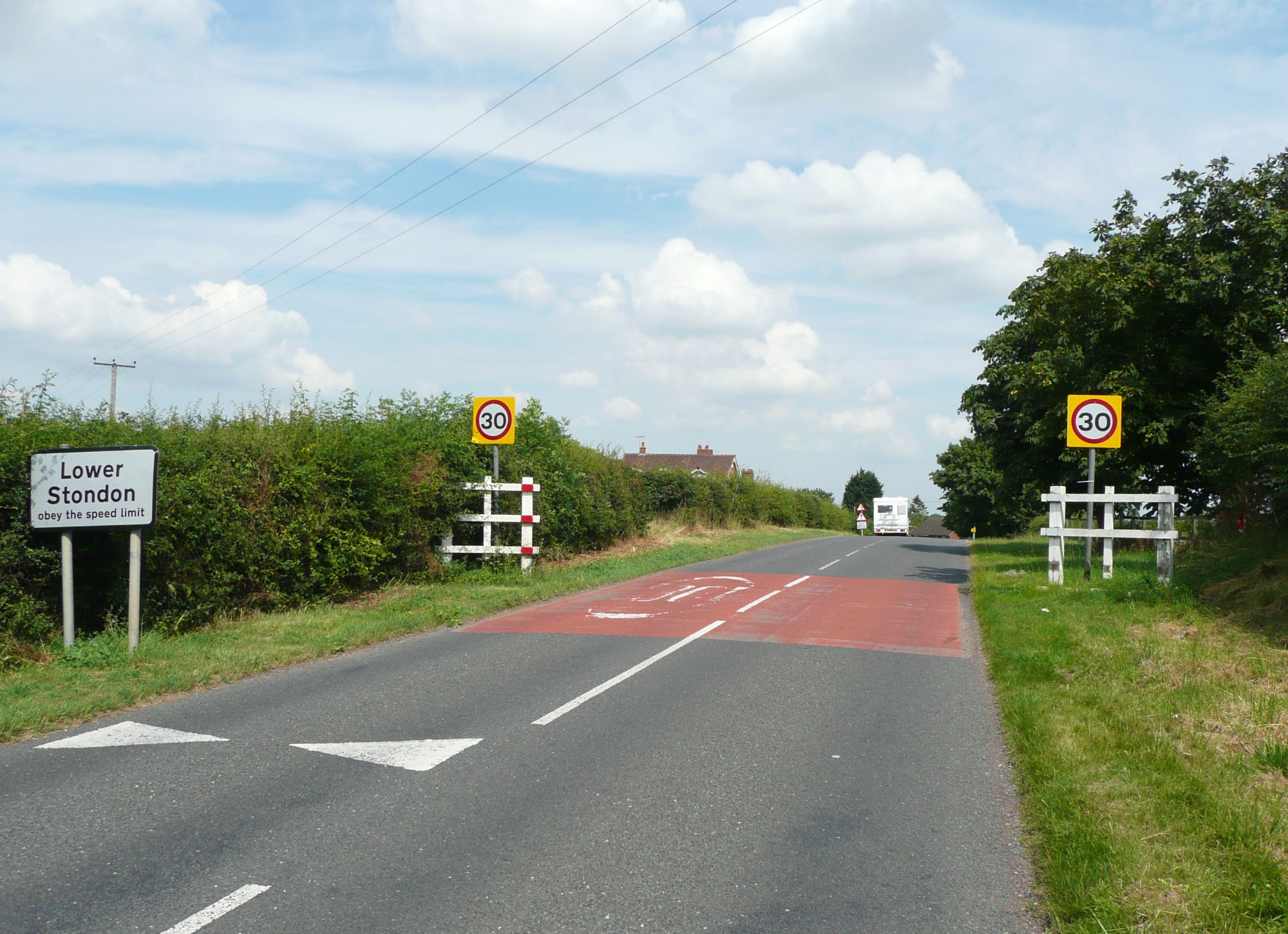
- Entering Lower Stondon

- Location within Bedfordshire
- OS grid reference: TL155355
- Civil parish: Stondon
- Unitary authority: Central Bedfordshire
- Ceremonial county: Bedfordshire
- Region: East
- Country: England
- Sovereign state: United Kingdom
- Post town: HENLOW
- Postcode district: SG16
- Dialling code: 01462
- Police: Bedfordshire
- Fire: Bedfordshire
- Ambulance: East of England
- UK Parliament: Mid Bedfordshire

Lower Stondon is a small village in the Central Bedfordshire district of Bedfordshire, England. It is located close to the border with Hertfordshire, around 2.5 miles (4 km) south-west of Henlow. It is part of the larger Stondon civil parish, which at the 2001 Census had a population of approximately 2,000 increasing to approximately 2,300 at the 2011 Census.

The A600 road from Hitchin to Bedford runs close to the village, while the nearest railway station is Arlesey on the East Coast Main Line.

== History ==
=== Domesday Entry ===
The Domesday Book has two entries for Lower Stondon.

In Folio 209 Bedfordshire, Section Roman VIII, The Land of St Benedict of Ramsey, Clifton Hundred it says:
In [Lower and Upper] Stondon the same abbot [of St Benedict] holds half a hide. There is land for half a plough, and there is [half a plough]. This land belongs and belonged to the Demesne of the church of St Benedict. It is worth 15s.

In Folio 209 Bedfordshire, Section Roman LV, The Land of the Wife of Ralph Taillebois, Clifton Hundred it says:
In [Lower and Upper] Stondon Engeler holds 2½ hides of Azelina. There is land for 2½ ploughs. In Demesne [are] 2 ploughs; and 3 bordars with half a plough. There are 2 slaves [and] meadow for 2½ ploughs. It is worth 60s; when received, 40s; TRE £4. Wulfmær, of Eaton Socon, a thegn of King Edward, held this land; and there were 5 soak men, men of the same Wulfmær, and they could give and sell [their land] to whom they wished.

=== Second World War ===
On the afternoon of Friday 26 September 1940 a single German bomber attacked, and 9 high explosive bombs were dropped, and two semi-detached houses were destroyed. Eleven people were killed by the Luftwaffe in the whole of Bedfordshire, excluding Luton.

== Media ==
Part of the village receives the Advertiser, the Comet and the Bedfordshire on Sunday newspapers. The village had its own magazine, distributed each season about the village and surrounding area called Stondon Times. This stopped in about 2008 and at present no single magazine has taken its place. The village also receives two magazines distributed to villages in the surrounding area, one called In and Around and the other called The Villager.

== Education ==
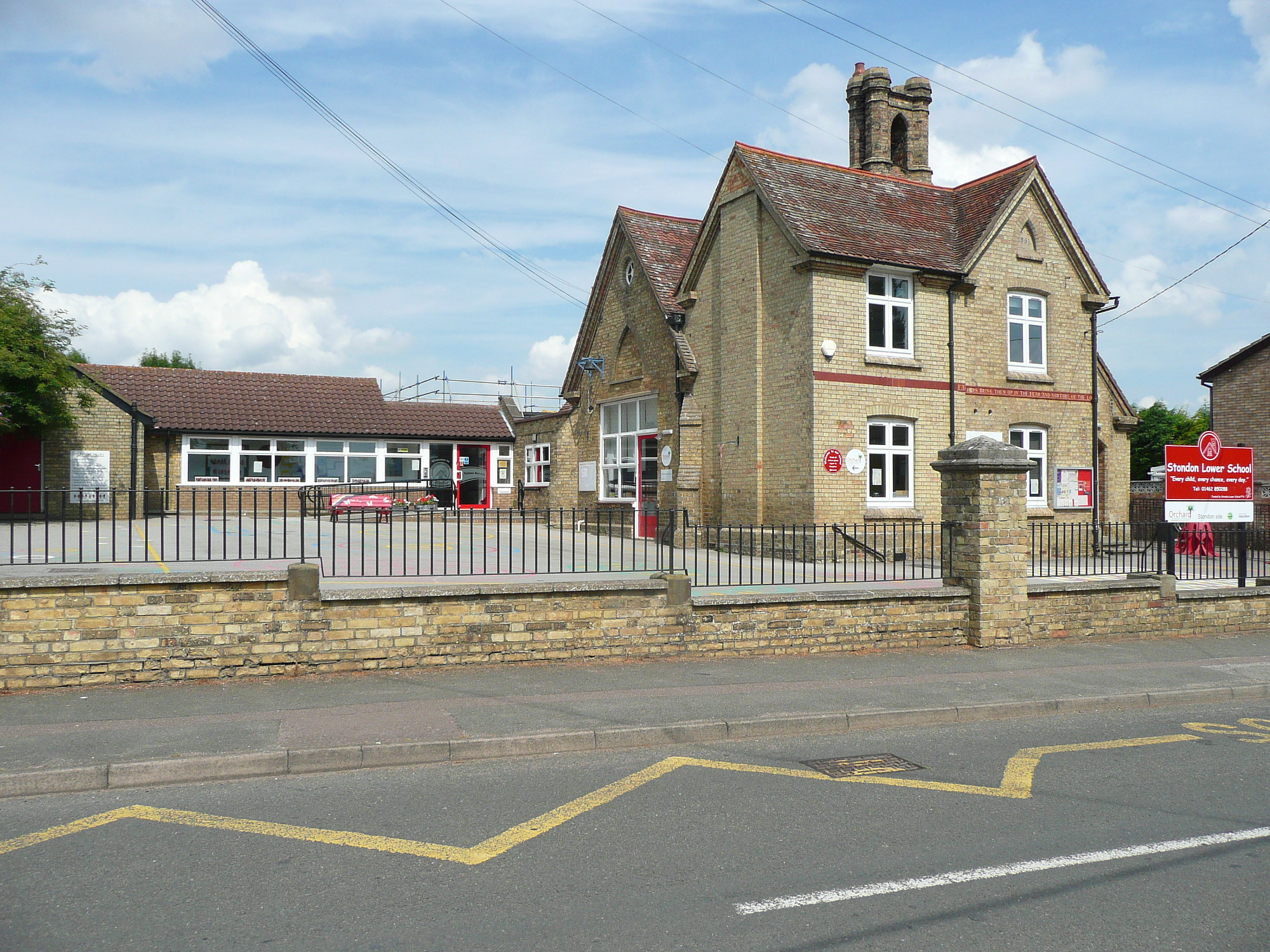
Stondon Lower School

The village has a Lower School, which was originally built in 1861 and extended in the 1950s and 1960s. Children join when they are 4 and then transfer to a Middle School in the area aged 9 (Henlow Middle or Robert Bloomfield) and then onto Samuel Whitbread Academy aged 13.

The schools all maintain websites which can be found at -

Stondon Lower School - Robert Bloomfield Middle School - Henlow Middle School - Samuel Whitbread Academy -

== Stondon Transport Museum ==
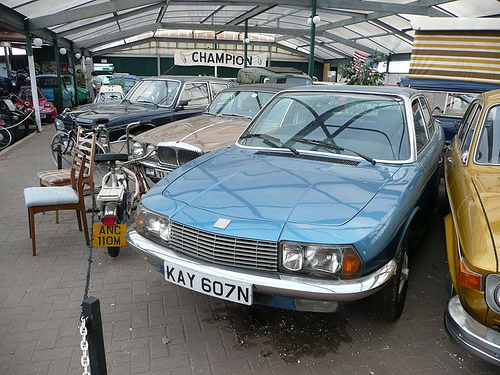
An NSU Ro 80 at the Stondon Transport Museum

The village hosted the largest private transport museum in the UK. The collection had over 400 exhibits, including cars, motorcycles, tanks, aircraft, and a full-size replica of Captain Cook's ship, the HM Bark Endeavour. The museum closed in April 2015.

== Notes ==
1. http://www.mountpleasantgolfclub.co.uk/
2. Domesday Book, A Complete Translation, Penguin Books, ISBN 0-14-143994-7
3. Central Bedfordshire Council
4. Stondon Parish Council
