= James Jamieson, Baron Jamieson =

British politician

The Right Honourable Councillor The Lord Jamieson OBE
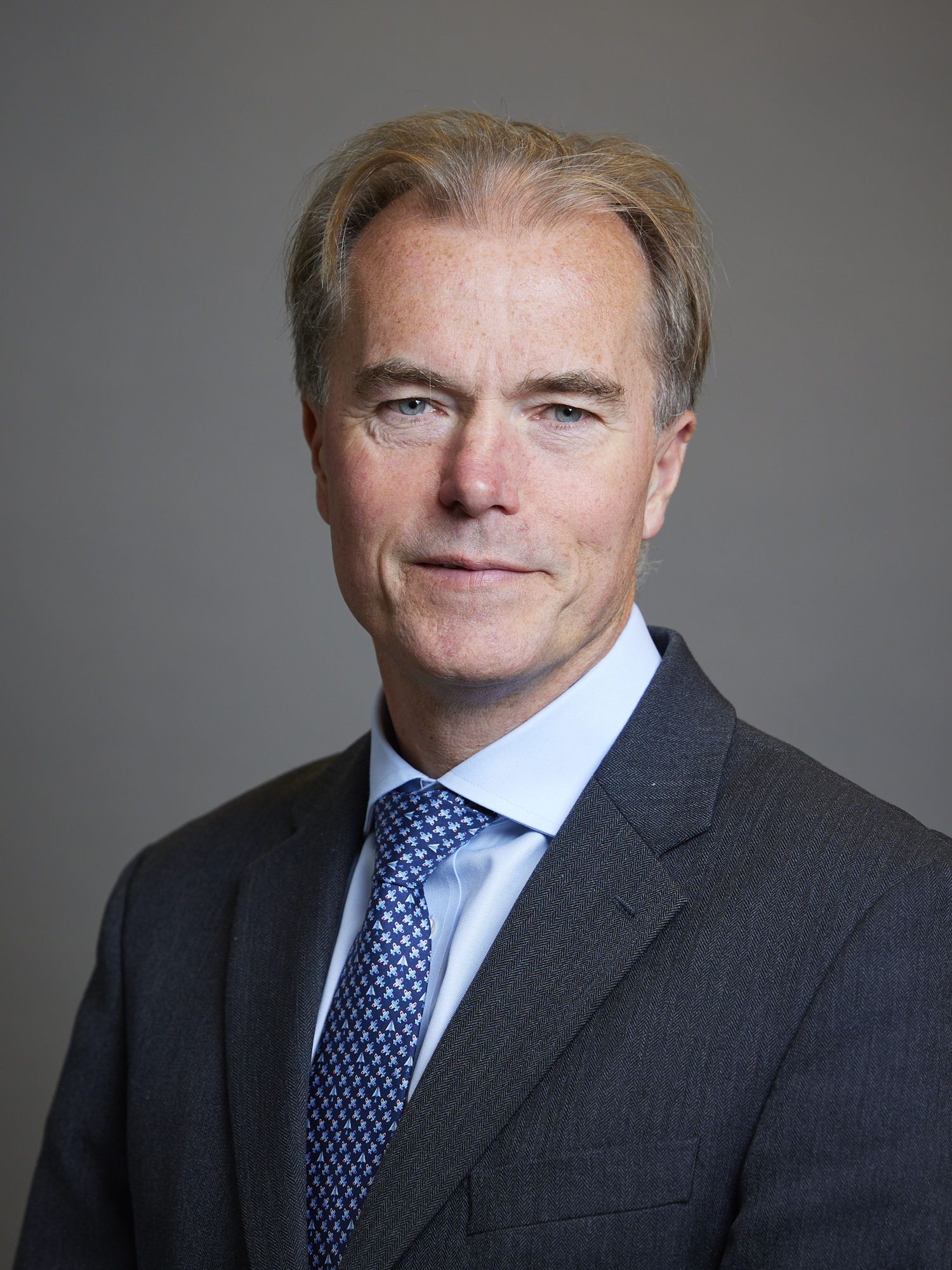
- Official portrait, 2024

Member of the House of Lords
- Lord Temporal
- Life peerage 11 March 2024

Personal details
- Party: Conservative
- Education: University of Sheffield

James Gerard Jamieson, Baron Jamieson, OBE is a British Conservative politician and life peer. He is a member of the House of Lords, a member and former leader of Central Bedfordshire Council, and a former chairman of the Local Government Association.

Jamieson has lived in Bedfordshire since the mid-1980s. He studied at the University of Sheffield and graduated in 1986 with a Master of Engineering degree in materials process engineering.

Jamieson was appointed an Officer of the Order of the British Empire (OBE) in the 2022 New Year Honours for services to local government. He was nominated for a life peerage by Prime Minister Rishi Sunak and on 11 March 2024 was created Baron Jamieson, of Maulden in the County of Bedfordshire.

Orders of precedence in the United Kingdom
| Preceded by The Lord Goodman of Wycombe | Gentlemen; Baron Jamieson | Followed by The Lord Hannett of Everton |
