= Cock =

Cock or cocks most commonly refers to:

- Cock, cockerel or rooster, a male of any bird species, especially chicken
- Cock (slang), a vulgar slang term for a penis
- Hammer (firearms), part of a firearm sometimes called the "cock"

Cock or cocks may also refer to:

== Names ==
- Cock (surname)
- Cocks (surname)

== Places ==
- Cocks Glacier, Ross Dependency, Antarctica
- Mount Cocks, Victoria Land, Antarctica
- Cock Bridge (Ljubljana), a footbridge in Ljubljana, Slovenia
- Cock Marsh, Berkshire, England, UK
- Cocks, Cornwall, a hamlet in England, UK
- Cock Beck, a stream in Yorkshire, England, UK
- De Haan, Belgium, known historically in English as "The Cock"

== Pubs and bars ==
- The Cock, a gay bar in New York City, United States
- The Cock, Broom, a Grade II listed public house in Broom, Bedfordshire, England
- The Cock, Fulham, a historic public house in London, England
- The Cock, St Albans, a public house in St Albans, Hertfordshire, England
- Cock Tavern Theatre, a pub theatre in Kilburn, London, England
- The Cock sign, a pub sign in Sutton, London, England
- Ye Olde Cock Inn, Manchester, Greater Manchester, England
- Ye Olde Cock Tavern, Fleet Street, London, England

== Vehicles ==
- Antonov An-22 or Cock, a heavy military transport aircraft
- Colditz Cock, a glider built by British Second World War prisoners of war in Colditz Castle for an escape attempt

== Other uses ==
- .co.ck, a second-level domain of the Cook Islands
- Cock, a colloquial term for a small valve or spigot
- Cock (play), 2009, by Mike Bartlett
- Cock ale, an ale popular in 17th and 18th-century England
- Cocks baronets, two baronetcies, one extinct and one extant
- Cock Lane, a street in London
- Riihimäki Cocks, a handball team

== See also ==
- Caulk, a sealant
- Cock a doodle doo, an English-language nursery rhyme
- Cock and Bull (disambiguation)
- Cock Bridge (Aberdeenshire), a settlement in Aberdeenshire, Scotland
- Cockfight
- Cock ring
- Cockpit (disambiguation)
- Cocktail
- Coq (renamed Rocq), an application used in computer science
- Coque (disambiguation)
- Cox (disambiguation)
- Gamecock
- Koç, a surname
- KOC (disambiguation)
- Gun, which may be cocked, or readied to fire
