= Cockpit (disambiguation) =

A cockpit is the flight deck of a fixed-wing aircraft.

Cockpit may also refer to:

== Arts and entertainment ==
=== Theatres and musical venues ===
- The Cockpit (Leeds), a musical venue in Leeds, England
- Cockpit Theatre, Drury Lane 1616 to 1665
- Cockpit Theatre, Marylebone, a theatre in London

=== Other arts and entertainment ===
- Cockpit, a play by Bridget Boland
- Cockpit (2012 film), a 2012 Swedish film
- Cockpit (2017 film), a 2017 Indian film
- Cockpit (novel), a 1975 novel by Jerzy Kosiński
- The Cockpit (OVA), a 1993 anime based on three manga by artist Leiji Matsumoto
- Cockpit (web series), comedy web-series

== Other uses ==
- Cockpit (sailing), an area below deck near the stern of a naval sailing ship
- Cockpit (software), a web-based remote administration software for Linux servers
- Cockpit-in-Court, or the Royal Cockpit, part of the historic Palace of Whitehall and originally used for cockfighting
- Cockpit Country, Jamaica
- Cockpit USA, an apparel designer and manufacturer
- The Cockpit, London, a public house in the City of London, England
- Operation Cockpit, an Allied bombing raid on Japanese port and oil facilities in World War II
- The arena where cockfights take place
- The driver's seat of most open wheel racecars, especially in Formula One and Indy car racing

== See also ==
- The Cockpit (disambiguation)
