= The Cockpit =

The Cockpit can refer to:

- Cockpit Theatre, a 17th-century theatre in London (also known as the Phoenix) that opened in 1616
- The Cockpit, a theatre in London, England that opened in 1970
- The Cockpit (OVA), a three-part anime series made in 1993 based on manga by artist Leiji Matsumoto
- The Cockpit (Leeds), a musical venue in Leeds, England that opened in 1994
- The Cockpit, London, a pub in London
