= Broom, Bedfordshire =

Village in Bedfordshire, England

Coordinates: 52.0729°N 0.2916°W

Broom
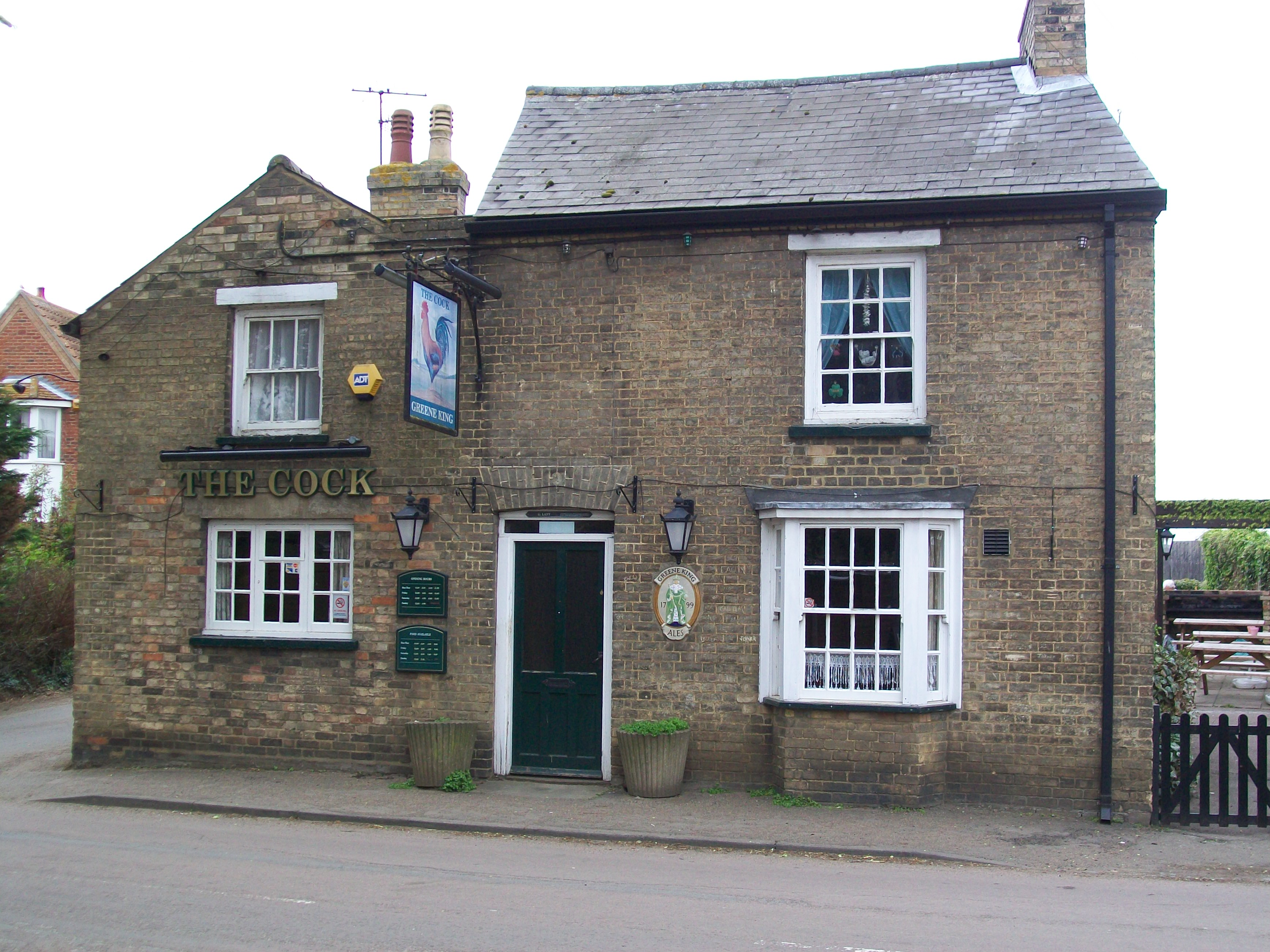
- The Cock

- Location within Bedfordshire
- Population: 579
- Civil parish: Southill
- Unitary authority: Central Bedfordshire
- Ceremonial county: Bedfordshire
- Region: East
- Country: England
- Sovereign state: United Kingdom
- Post town: Biggleswade
- Postcode district: SG18
- Dialling code: 01767
- Police: Bedfordshire
- Fire: Bedfordshire
- Ambulance: East of England
- UK Parliament: North Bedfordshire

Broom is a small village in the civil parish of Southill, in the Central Bedfordshire district of Bedfordshire, England about 8.5 miles (14 km) south-east of the county town of Bedford.

The 2011 census shows its population as 579.

== Geography ==
Broom lies 1.5 miles (2 km) south-west of Biggleswade and 19.5 miles (31 km) south-west of Cambridge.

Elevation

The village is 38 metres (125 ft) above sea level.

Geology, soil type and land use

The village is surrounded by arable farmland and lies on glacial gravel over green and brown sandstones. The soil is highly fertile, freely draining and slightly acid but base-rich. Since the mid-1990s sand and gravel quarrying has taken place north of the village between the B658 and Gypsy Lane on land previously used for market gardening. There are a number of man-made lakes including the 45 acres (18 ha) of Broom Big Lake, now used for fishing.

The night sky and light pollution

Light pollution is the level of radiance (night lights) shining up into the night sky. The Campaign to Protect Rural England (CPRE) divides the level of night sky brightness into 9 bands with band 1 being the darkest i.e. with the lowest level of light pollution and band 9 the brightest and most polluted. Broom with an index of 1-2 nanoWatts (nW) is in band 4. The night sky brightens towards Biggleswade but is darker to the west.

== History ==
The name Broom simply refers to the plant.

Broom is mentioned in the Domesday Book. The entry reads; Brume: Nigel de la Vast from Nigel d'Aubigny

It has long been a 'farming' village with a number of small local market gardeners. Many have been farming families for generations.

The village originally consisted of the High Street, High Road and Southill Road. Housing was built by Biggleswade Rural District Council on Bancroft Avenue in the first quarter of the 20th century. In the 1970s, Birch Close and The Woodlands were built on the other side of 'the ditch'. There is a mixture of old farm houses as well as newer buildings.

In past years the village had four pubs, a post office, village shop and a small church. There was also a village football team that played on the village green.

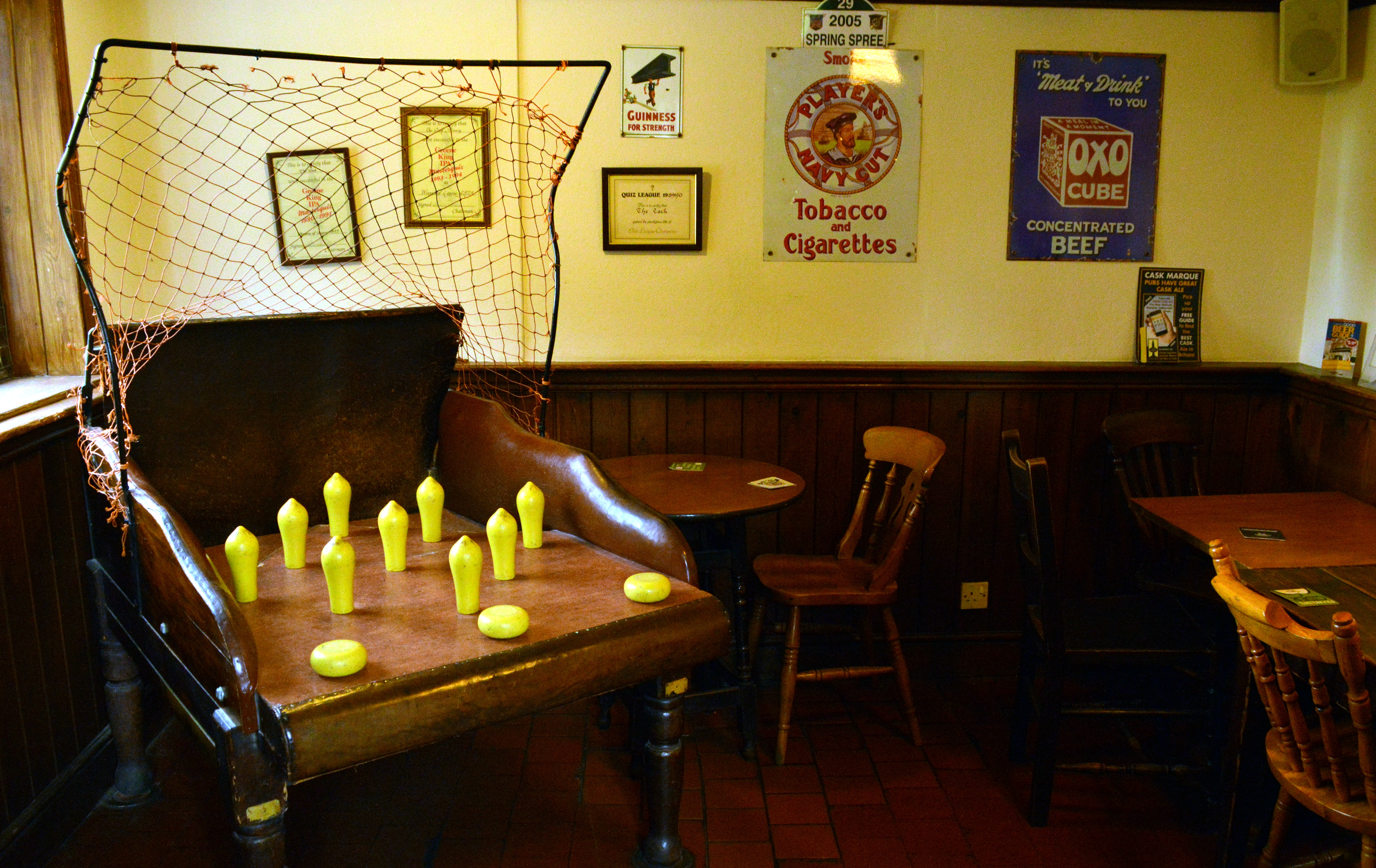
The traditional game of Nine Pin Bar Skittles at The Cock, Broom, Bedfordshire.

The Cock is a mid-19th century Grade II listed public house at 23 High Street. It is on the Campaign for Real Ale's National Inventory of Historic Pub Interiors. The pub is one of a handful in the UK that has no serving counter. Drinks and food are served by staff to customers in a variety of small rooms. The pub also boasts traditional table skittles.

Broom Hall is a three-storey, grade II listed, mid 18th century country house standing just off the High Street. It has been converted into flats and apartments. Broom Park was described as a Gentleman's Country Estate when it was put up for auction shortly after the Second World War.

== Governance ==
Broom elects six councillors to Southill parish council. It is part of Northill ward for elections to the Central Bedfordshire Unitary Authority.

Prior to 1894, Broom was administered as part of the hundred of Wixamtree. From 1894 until 1974 it was in Biggleswade Rural District and from 1974 to 2009 in Mid Bedfordshire District.

Broom is in the North Bedfordshire UK Parliament constituency. From 1918 to 2010 it was in Mid Bedfordshire and from 2011 to 2023 in North East Bedfordshire.

== Public transport ==
Grant Palmer operates route 200 a two-hourly Monday to Saturday daytime bus service to Biggleswade (journey time seven minutes) and to Southill, Shefford and Flitwick (just over an hour). There are weekly, Wednesday only services to Cambridge (operated by Ivel Sprinter. Journey time one hour 12 minutes) and Bedford (by Wanderbus. Time 30 minutes). Wanderbus also runs monthly services to St Neots, Milton Keynes and Welwyn Garden City.

The nearest railway station is Biggleswade.

== Community ==
Usually in July there is a village fete, which raises money for local charities as well as providing entertainment for the villagers and visitors. Now discontinued, there was also a weekend music festival known as "Broomstock" usually at the end of July.

== Education ==
It is in the catchment zones for Robert Bloomfield Academy and Samuel Whitbread Academy, an upper school and sixth form.
