= Cocktail =

Combination of spirits and non alcoholic ingredients

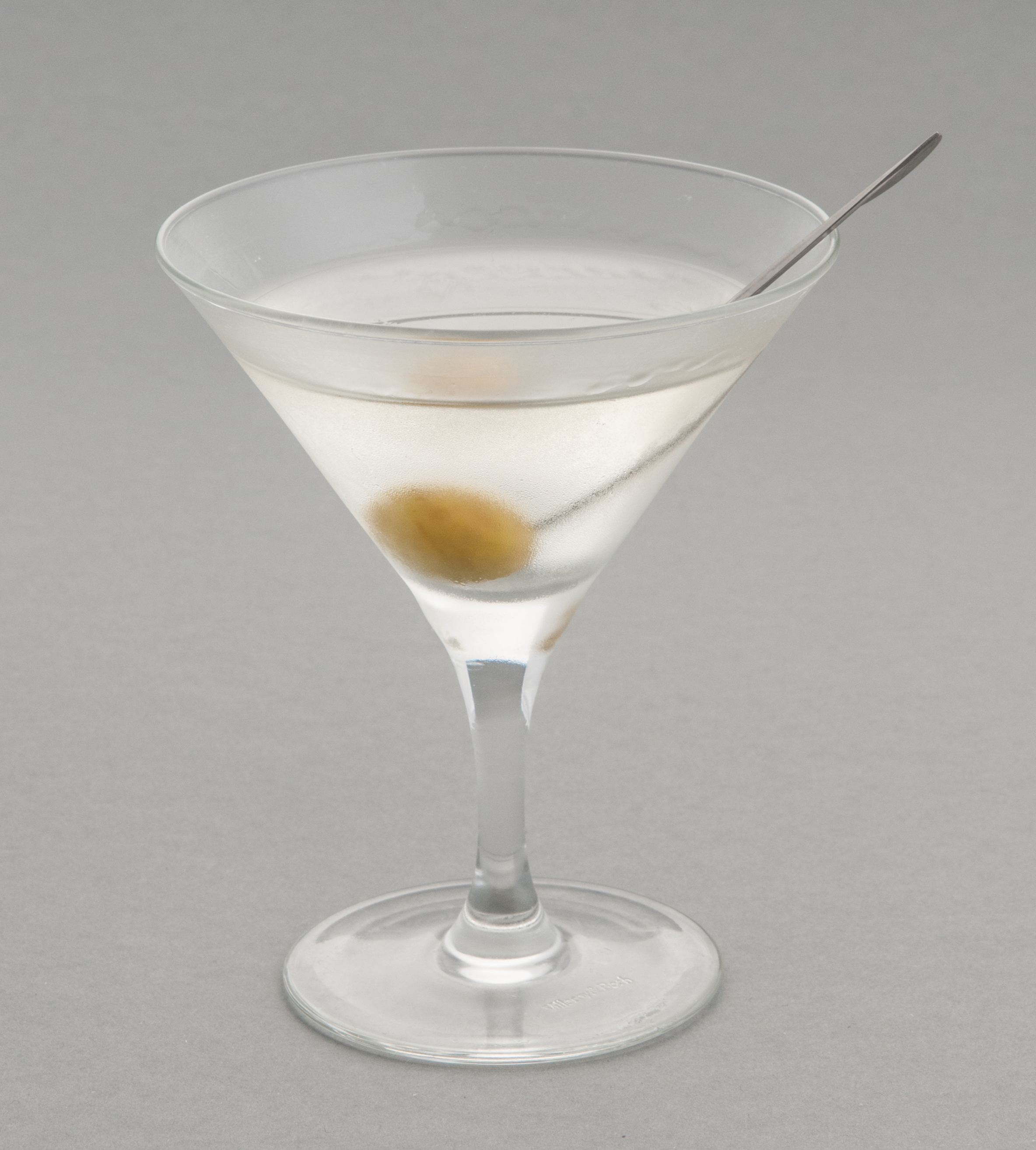
A martini served in a cocktail glass

A cocktail is a mixed drink, usually alcoholic. Most commonly, a cocktail is a combination of one or more spirits mixed with other ingredients, such as juices, flavored syrups, tonic water, shrubs, and bitters. Cocktails vary widely across regions of the world.

== History ==
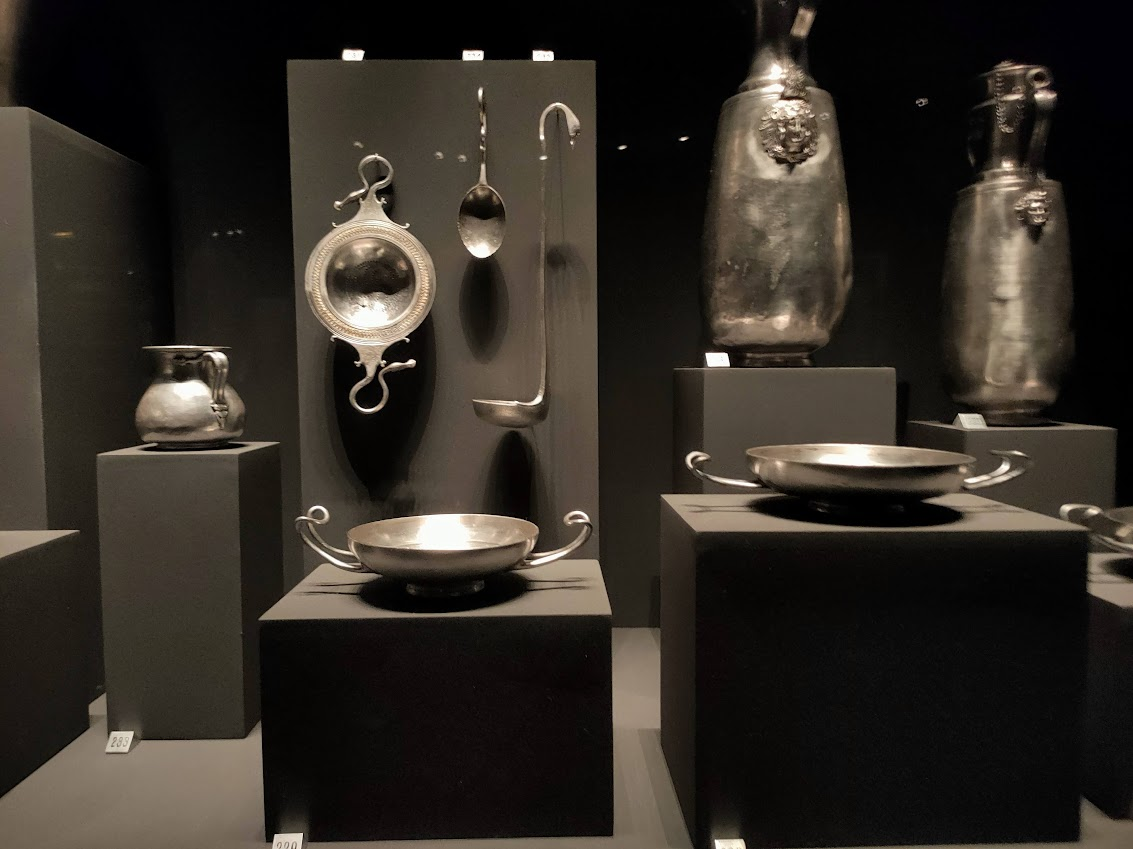
Cocktail accessories dating back to the 4th century BCE. Museum of the Royal Tombs of Aigai, Greece

A well-known "cocktail" in ancient Greece was named kykeon. It is mentioned in the Homeric texts and was used in the Eleusinian Mysteries. "Cocktail" accessories are exposed in the Museum of the Royal Tombs of Aigai (Greece). They were used in the court of Philip II of Macedon to prepare and serve mixtures of wine, water, honey as well as extracts of aromatic herbs and flowers, during the banquets.

In the United States, a written mention of "cocktail" as a beverage appeared in The Farmers Cabinet, 1803. The first definition of a cocktail as an alcoholic beverage appeared three years later in The Balance and Columbian Repository (Hudson, New York) May 13, 1806. Traditionally, cocktail ingredients included spirits, sugar, water and bitters; however, this definition evolved throughout the 1800s to include the addition of a liqueur.

In 1862, Jerry Thomas published a bartender's guide called How to Mix Drinks; or, The Bon Vivant's Companion which included 10 cocktail recipes using bitters, to differentiate from other drinks such as punches and cobblers.

Cocktails continued to evolve and gain popularity throughout the 1900s, with the term eventually expanding to cover all mixed drinks. In 1917, the term cocktail party was coined by Julius S. Walsh Jr. of St. Louis, Missouri. With wine and beer being less available during the Prohibition in the United States (1920–1933), liquor-based cocktails became more popular due to accessibility, followed by a decline in popularity during the late 1960s. The early to mid-2000s saw the rise of cocktail culture through the style of mixology which mixes traditional cocktails and other novel ingredients. By 2023, the so-called "cocktail in a can" had proliferated (at least in the United States) to become a common item in liquor stores.

In the modern world and the Information Age, cocktail recipes are widely shared online on websites. Cocktails and restaurants that serve them are frequently covered and reviewed in tourism magazines and guides. Some cocktails, such as the Mojito, Manhattan, and Martini, have become staples in restaurants and pop culture.

== Components ==
In general terms the most important elements consist of the base, a modifying, smoothing or aromatizing agent, and an additional special flavouring or coloring agent.

The base will always be the most dominant ingredient, and always consists of spirit based liquors or wine based liquors. The type of base will determine the style of liquor, thus gin based cocktails, such as the Martini, will differ from whisky based cocktails, such as the Manhattan. It is possible to mix a cocktail combining a number of bases, as long as they share essential characteristics, though it is considered "dangerous".

The modifying agent functions as a buffer for the sharp bite of the base, and adds character to its natural flavour. Modifiers can be classified into the three categories of aromatics and bitters, fruit juices (with or without sugar), and smoothing agents (such as cream, sugar, eggs, or aquafaba). Modifiers are often used sparingly so as not to overpower the base, Embury suggested a maximum of half an egg white, one quarter of a whole egg, one tablespoon of heavy cream or one teaspoon of sugar per drink.

Special flavouring agents, including not only non-alcoholic syrups but also various liqueurs and cordials, as well as other ingredients which could also be used as modifiers. Like the modifiers, special care must be taken so that the special flavouring agent does not overpower the base. For this reason quantities are often limited to drops and dashes.

== Usage and related terms ==
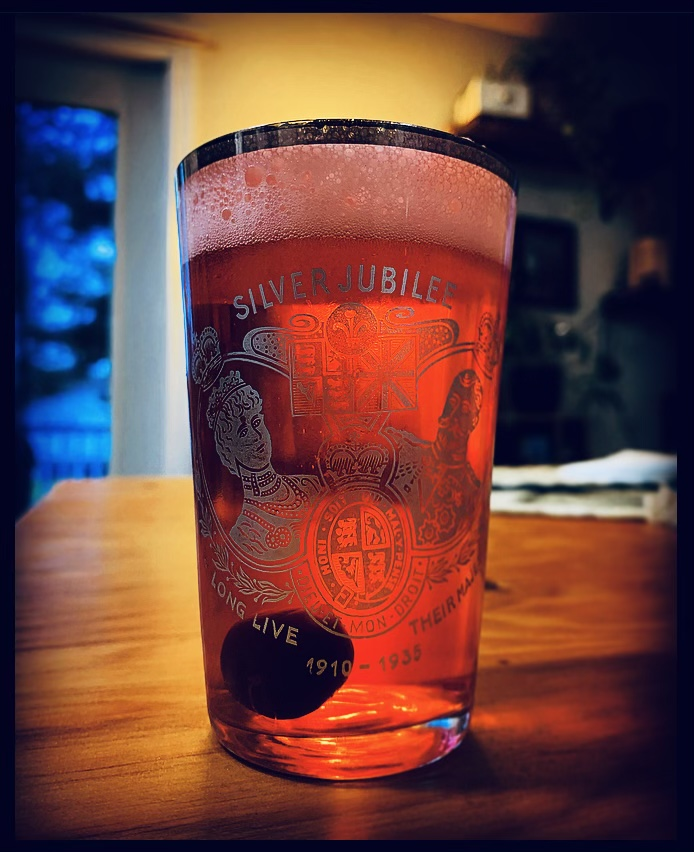
Queen Mary, a North American cocktail, made by combining beer, grenadine and Maraschino cherries

The term cocktail can refer to a wide variety of drinks; it is typically a mixed drink containing alcohol.

When a combined drink contains only a distilled spirit and a mixer, such as soda or fruit juice, it is a highball. Many of the International Bartenders Association Official Cocktails are highballs. When a mixed drink contains only a distilled spirit and a liqueur, it is a duo, and when it adds cream or a cream-based liqueur, it is a trio. Additional ingredients may be sugar, honey, milk, cream, and various herbs.

Mixed drinks without alcohol that resemble cocktails are often called "zero-proof" or "virgin" cocktails, or "mocktails" ("mock" meaning fake or imitation).

== Etymology ==
The origin of the word "cocktail" is disputed. It is presumably from "cock-tail", meaning "with tail standing up, like a cock's", in particular of a horse, but how this came to be applied to alcoholic mixed drinks is unclear. The most prominent theories are that it refers to a stimulant, hence a stimulating drink, or to a non-purebred horse, hence a mixed drink.

Cocktail historian David Wondrich speculates that "cocktail" is a reference to gingering, a practice for perking up an old horse by means of a ginger suppository so that the animal would "cock its tail up and be frisky", hence by extension a stimulating drink, like pick-me-up. This agrees with usage in early citations (1798: "'cock-tail' (vulgarly called ginger)", 1803: drink at 11 a.m. to clear the head, 1806: "stimulating liquor"), and suggests that a cocktail was initially considered a medicinal drink, which accords with the use of bitters.

Etymologist Anatoly Liberman endorses as "highly probable" the theory advanced by Låftman (1946), which Liberman summarizes as follows:

It was customary to dock the tails of horses that were not thoroughbred [...] They were called cocktailed horses, later simply cocktails. By extension, the word cocktail was applied to a vulgar, ill-bred person raised above his station, assuming the position of a gentleman but deficient in gentlemanly breeding. [...] Of importance [in the 1806 citation above] is [...] the mention of water as an ingredient. [...] Låftman concluded that cocktail was an acceptable alcoholic drink, but diluted, not a "purebred", a thing "raised above its station". Hence the highly appropriate slang word used earlier about inferior horses and sham gentlemen.

=== Citations ===
The first recorded use of cocktail not referring to a horse is found in The Morning Post and Gazetteer in London, England, March 20, 1798:

Mr. Pitt,
two petit vers of "L'huile de Venus"
Ditto, one of "perfeit amour"
Ditto, "cock-tail" (vulgarly called ginger)

The Oxford English Dictionary cites the word as originating in the U.S. The first recorded use of cocktail as a beverage (possibly non-alcoholic) in the United States appears in The Farmer's Cabinet, April 28, 1803:

11. [a.m.] Drank a glass of cocktail—excellent for the head...Call'd at the Doct's. found Burnham—he looked very wise—drank another glass of cocktail.

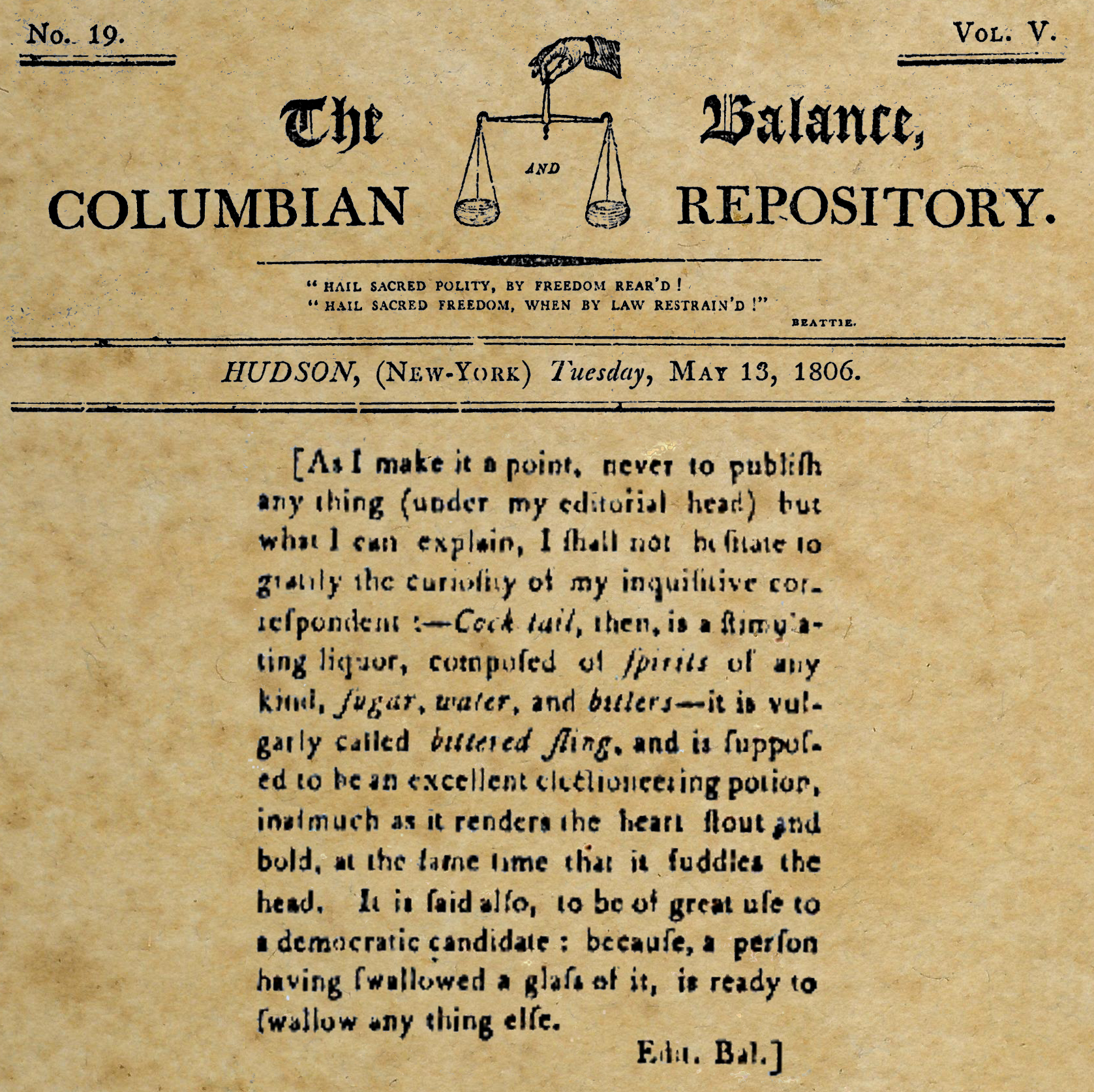
The first known definition of a cocktail, by Harry Croswell

The first definition of cocktail known to be an alcoholic beverage appeared in The Balance and Columbian Repository (Hudson, New York) May 13, 1806; editor Harry Croswell answered the question, "What is a cocktail?":

Cock-tail is a stimulating liquor, composed of spirits of any kind, sugar, water, and bitters—it is vulgarly called bittered sling, and is supposed to be an excellent electioneering potion, in as much as it renders the heart stout and bold, at the same time that it fuddles the head. It is said, also to be of great use to a democratic candidate: because a person, having swallowed a glass of it, is ready to swallow any thing else.

=== Folk etymologies ===
Other origins have been suggested, as corruptions of other words or phrases. These can be dismissed as folk etymologies, given the well-attested term "cock-tail" for a horse.

Dale DeGroff hypothesizes that the word evolved from the French coquetier, for an eggcup in which Antoine A. Peychaud, creator of Peychaud's Bitters, allegedly used to serve his guests a mix of cognac with a dash of his bitters.

Several authors have theorized that "cocktail" may be a corruption of "cock ale".

== Development ==
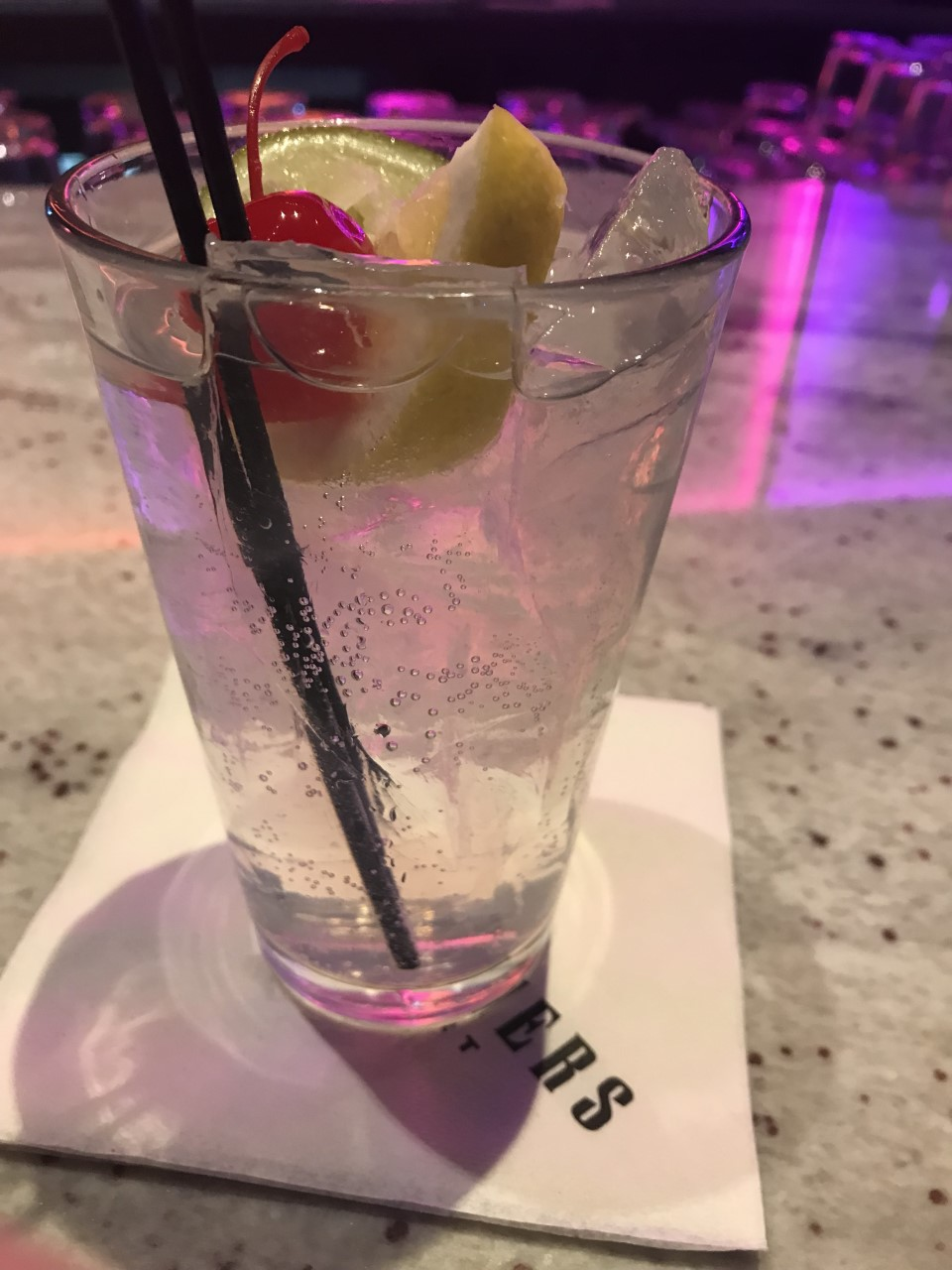
A Tom Collins, served in a glass of the same name

There is a lack of clarity on the origins of cocktails. Traditionally cocktails were a mixture of spirits, sugar, water, and bitters. By the 1860s, however, a cocktail frequently included a liqueur.

The first publication of a bartenders' guide which included cocktail recipes was in 1862 – How to Mix Drinks; or, The Bon Vivant's Companion, by "Professor" Jerry Thomas. In addition to recipes for punches, sours, slings, cobblers, shrubs, toddies, flips, and a variety of other mixed drinks were 10 recipes for "cocktails". A key ingredient distinguishing cocktails from other drinks in this compendium was the use of bitters. Mixed drinks popular today that conform to this original meaning of "cocktail" include the Old Fashioned whiskey cocktail, the Sazerac cocktail, and the Manhattan cocktail.

The ingredients listed (spirits, sugar, water, and bitters) match the ingredients of an Old Fashioned, which originated as a term used by late 19th-century bar patrons to distinguish cocktails made the "old-fashioned" way from newer, more complex cocktails.

In the 1869 recipe book Cooling Cups and Dainty Drinks, by William Terrington, cocktails are described as:

Cocktails are compounds very much used by "early birds" to fortify the inner man, and by those who like their consolations hot and strong.

The term highball appears during the 1890s to distinguish a drink composed only of a distilled spirit and a mixer.

Published in 1902 by Farrow and Jackson, "Recipes of American and Other Iced Drinks" contains recipes for nearly two dozen cocktails, some still recognizable today.

The first "cocktail party" ever thrown was allegedly by Julius S. Walsh Jr. of St. Louis, Missouri, in May 1917. Walsh invited 50 guests to her home at noon on a Sunday. The party lasted an hour until lunch was served at 1 p.m. The site of this first cocktail party still stands. In 1924, the Roman Catholic Archdiocese of St. Louis bought the Walsh mansion at 4510 Lindell Boulevard, and it has served as the local archbishop's residence ever since.

During Prohibition in the United States (1920–1933), when alcoholic beverages were illegal, cocktails were still consumed illegally in establishments known as speakeasies. The quality of the liquor available during Prohibition was much worse than previously. There was a shift from whiskey to gin, which does not require aging and is, therefore, easier to produce illicitly. Honey, fruit juices, and other flavorings served to mask the foul taste of the inferior liquors. Sweet cocktails were easier to drink quickly, an important consideration when the establishment might be raided at any moment. With wine and beer less readily available, liquor-based cocktails took their place, even becoming the centerpiece of the new cocktail party.

Cocktails became less popular in the late 1960s and through the 1970s, until resurging in the 1980s with vodka often substituting for the original gin in drinks such as the martini. Traditional cocktails began to make a comeback in the 2000s, and by the mid-2000s there was a renaissance of cocktail culture in a style typically referred to as mixology that draws on traditional cocktails for inspiration but uses novel ingredients and often complex flavors.

== See also ==
- The Museum of the American Cocktail

=== Lists ===
- List of beverages
- List of cocktails
- List of IBA official cocktails
- List of national drinks
