= Cock ale =

Archaic English ale made with chicken

Cock ale, popular in 17th- and 18th-century England, was an ale whose recipe consisted of normal ale, to which was later added a bag stuffed with a parboiled, skinned and gutted cock, and various fruits and spices.

== Recipe ==
The Oxford English Dictionary, which describes Cock ale as "ale mixed with the jelly or minced meat of a boiled cock, besides other ingredients", dates the drink's earliest mention to the mid 17th century, in Kenelm Digby's Closet Opened (published in 1669). Included as a recipe, Digby's guide prescribes:

Take eight Gallons of Ale; take a Cock and boil him well; then take four pounds of Raisins of the Sun well stoned, two or three Nutmegs, three or four flakes of Mace, half a pound of Dates; beat these all in a Mortar, and put to them two quarts of the best Sack; and when the Ale hath done working, put these in, and stop it close six or seven days, and then bottle it, and a month after you may drink it.

A similar recipe was printed in 1739 in The Compleat Housewife:

Take ten gallons of ale, and a large cock, the older the better; parboil the cock, flay him, and stamp him in a stone mortar till his bones are broken (you must craw and gut him when you flay him); then put the cock into two quarts of sack, and put it to three pounds of raisins of the sun stoned, some blades of mace, and a few cloves; put all these into a canvas bag, and a little before you find the ale has done working, put the ale and bag together into a vessel; in a week or nine days time bottle it up; fill the bottle but just above the neck, and give the same time to ripen as other ale.

Thomas Fuller's Pharmacopœia extemporanea (1710) offers a recipe for Pectoral Ale (a cough medicine), which, with the addition of the afore-mentioned bird, parboiled, could apparently be turned into Cock ale. Fuller explained that the drink "sweetens the Acrimony of the blood and humours, incites clammy phlegm, facilitates expectoration, invigorates the lungs, supplies soft nourishment, and is very profitable even in a consumption itself, if not too far gone." The drink's supposed medicinal qualities were also advertised in John Nott's Cooks and Confectioner's Dictionary (1723), which claims that Cock ale is "good against a Consumption, and to restore a decay'd Nature."

== Descriptions ==
A contemporary biographer claimed that King William III preferred Cock ale over wine. The drink's entry in Robert Nares's Glossary describes it as "a sort of ale which was very celebrated in the seventeenth century for its superior quality". Also included in that entry is a quote from Ned Ward's The London Spy, which calls Cock ale "a mixture of small-beer and treacle", although the author continues: "if this be cock-ale, said I, e'en let cocks-combs drink it." Nathan Bailey's Dictionarium britannicum (1736) describes it as a "pleasant drink, said to be provocative", a sentiment mirrored by Francis Grose's Classical Dictionary of the Vulgar Tongue (1785), which also calls it provocative. Writing in 1929, William Henry Nugent claimed that Cock ale was a concoction of bread and ale fed to fighting birds.

Several authors have theorised that Cock ale may have mutated into cocktail, an American word first recorded in 1803 whose origin is now lost.
