= Cockpit USA =

American apparel company

- Industry: Apparel
- Founder: Jeff Clyman
- Headquarters: New York, USA
- Website: cockpitusa.com

Cockpit USA is an American apparel designer and manufacturer, most notably the A-2 leather pilot's jacket and the G-1 bomber jacket. Founded in 1975 by Jeff Clyman, the company has supplied the United States Air Force as well as Hollywood movies such at Top Gun.

The company began in the catalog business, subsequently opening retail locations. Its products are exclusively crafted in the U.S.A, with most production occurring on the East Coast.
