= The Cock, Broom =

Listed pub in Bedfordshire, England

The Cock
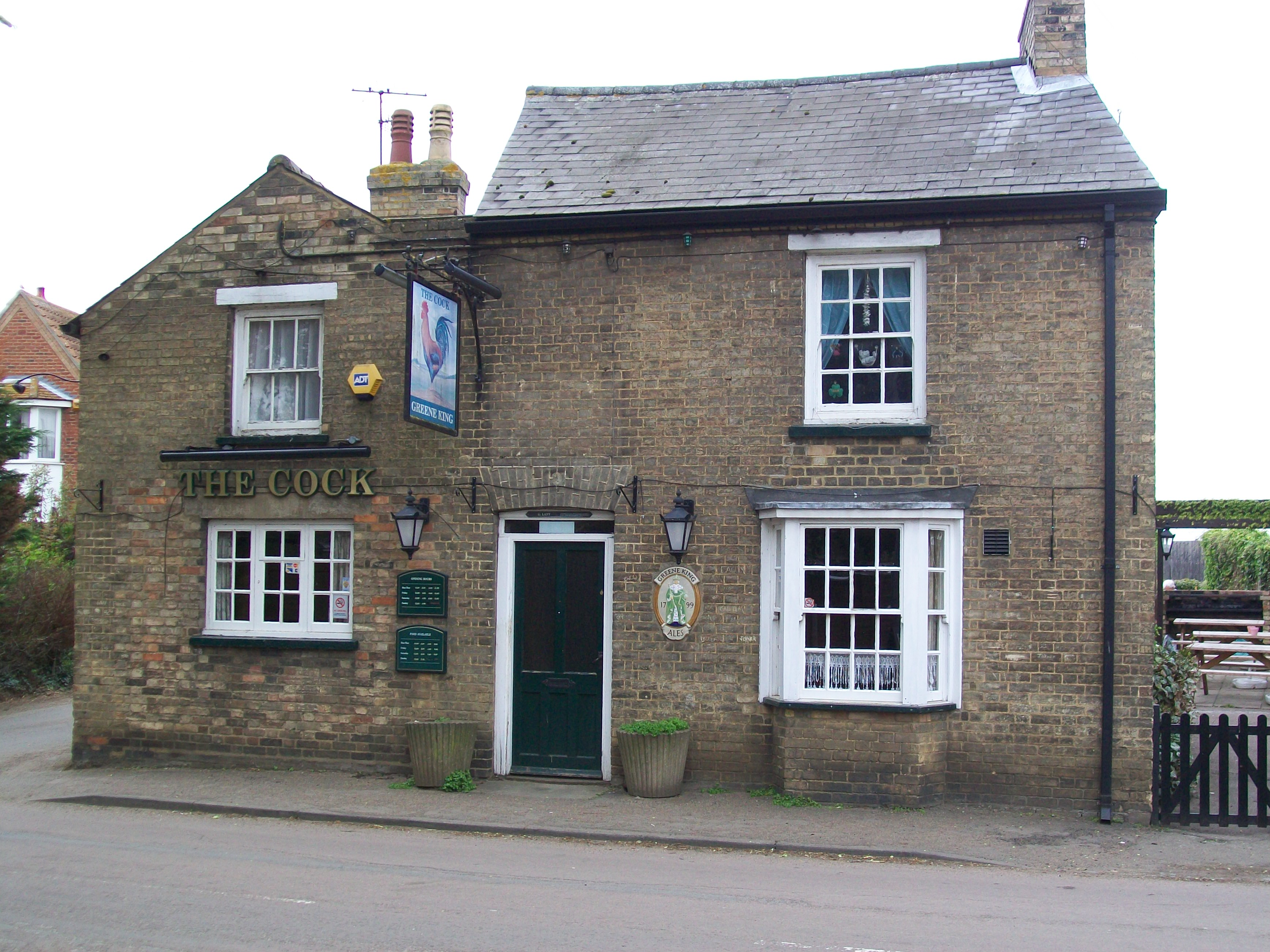
- The pub in 2011
- Former names: Cock & Tuns
- Alternative names: Cock Inn

General information
- Type: Public house; originally an alehouse and cottages
- Location: 23 High Street, Broom, Bedfordshire, England
- Coordinates: 52°04′26″N 0°17′28″W
- Year built: Mid-19th century
- Owner: Camelot Inns Ltd

Design and construction
- Designations

Listed Building – Grade II
- Official name: The Cock public house
- Designated: 24 February 1997
- Reference no.: 1257950

Website
- thecockinnbroom.com

The Cock is a Grade II listed public house on High Street in Broom, Bedfordshire, England. The pub's origins date to the 1830s, when it was first licensed as a beerhouse. Historic England describes the present building as dating from the mid-19th century and originally comprising an alehouse with adjoining cottages that were later combined into a single premises. The Cock is noted for its historic interior and is included in CAMRA's National Inventory of Historic Pub Interiors, where it is rated three stars for "outstanding national historic importance".

== History ==
A set of surviving property records traces the history of the public house from 1829, when the 3rd Baron Ongley of Old Warden sold a cottage to William Browning. The premises first received a beerhouse licence in 1836. The Campaign for Real Ale (CAMRA) states that the village pub originated in the 1830s. According to its official listing, the building dates from the mid-19th century and was originally constructed as an alehouse with adjoining cottages, which were later incorporated into a single premises.

Following Browning's death, his will directed that the property be sold, and it was offered at auction in 1860 as the Cock & Tuns. At that time it was described as a long-established beerhouse with living accommodation, a corn shop and cellar, a bakehouse, agricultural buildings, stables, a cow house, a barn, and over an acre of garden land. Three adjoining cottages were included in the sale, and the property was occupied by tenants connected with Simpson's Baldock Brewery.

The beerhouse was purchased by Joseph Ballard for his son Isaac, and ownership later passed to Alfred Ballard, who was recorded as landlord in 1869. By 1903 the premises were known simply as The Cock, and in 1908 they were mortgaged to the brewing firm Wells & Winch of Biggleswade. Ownership remained within the Ballard family, and in 1921 James Melrose Ballard sold The Cock to William Joseph Ballard. Wells & Winch became part of Greene King in 1961.

Alterations in 1977 included the removal of a glass-washing sink near the rear rooms. Further changes in the 1990s brought the toilets indoors, created additional public space, and brought a rear snug and dining room into regular use while leaving the character of the older front rooms largely unchanged.

It was included on CAMRA's National Inventory of Historic Pub Interiors before the inventory's grading system was revised. Under the revised scheme, it is rated three stars and its interior is regarded as being "of outstanding national historic importance". As of February 2026, the freehold is owned by Camelot Inns Ltd.

== Architecture ==
=== Exterior ===
The building is constructed of yellow brick with a slate roof and five chimney stacks. The right-hand section has two storeys, with a sash window on the upper floor, a projecting bay window at ground level, and an entrance with a part-glazed door. Attached to it is a long two-storey wing extending to the rear, with sash windows on the upper floor and a later three-part window below. The side elevation has windows of varying sizes and styles, together with several doorways arranged irregularly along the façade.

=== Interior ===
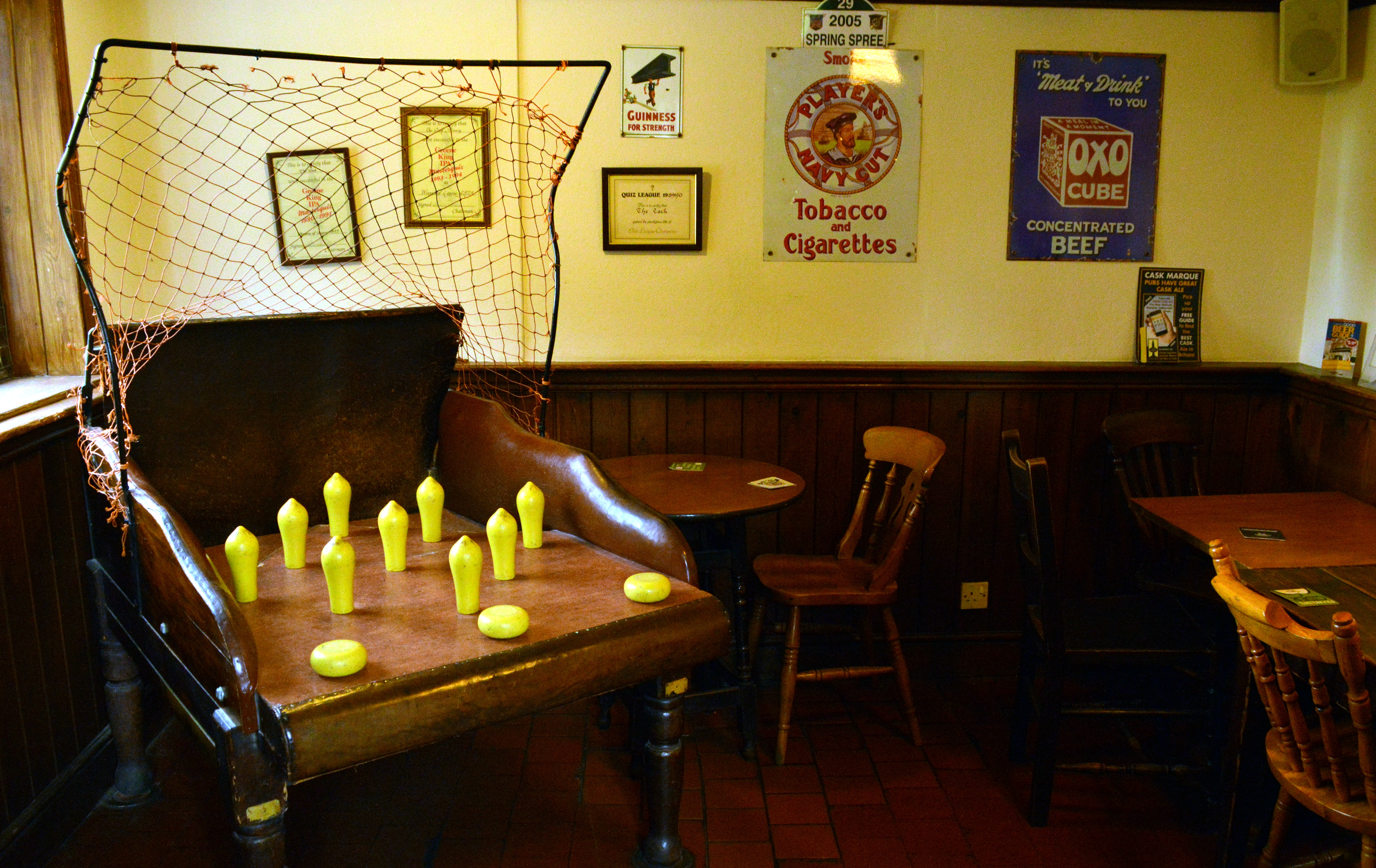
Nine Pin Bar Skittles at The Cock

Although altered and enlarged over time, it retains much of its historic character and now comprises five small rooms. The interior preserves a substantial collection of 19th-century pine fittings, including a skittles room with its original equipment, a front parlour with built-in seating and cupboards, and a rear parlour with fixed seating, panelling, a fitted cupboard and a wooden fireplace surround. A panelled corridor links the various rooms, and tiled floors survive throughout.

The former public bar is now used as a games room, while other spaces, including a snug and dining room, were brought into use during later alterations. Notably, the pub has no bar counter, with drinks continuing to be served from the cellar area. The interior is particularly notable for the survival of its historic layout and fittings, providing an unusually complete example of a traditional rural pub.
