= The Cock, Fulham =

Pub in Fulham, London

Coordinates: 51.4813°N 0.1997°W

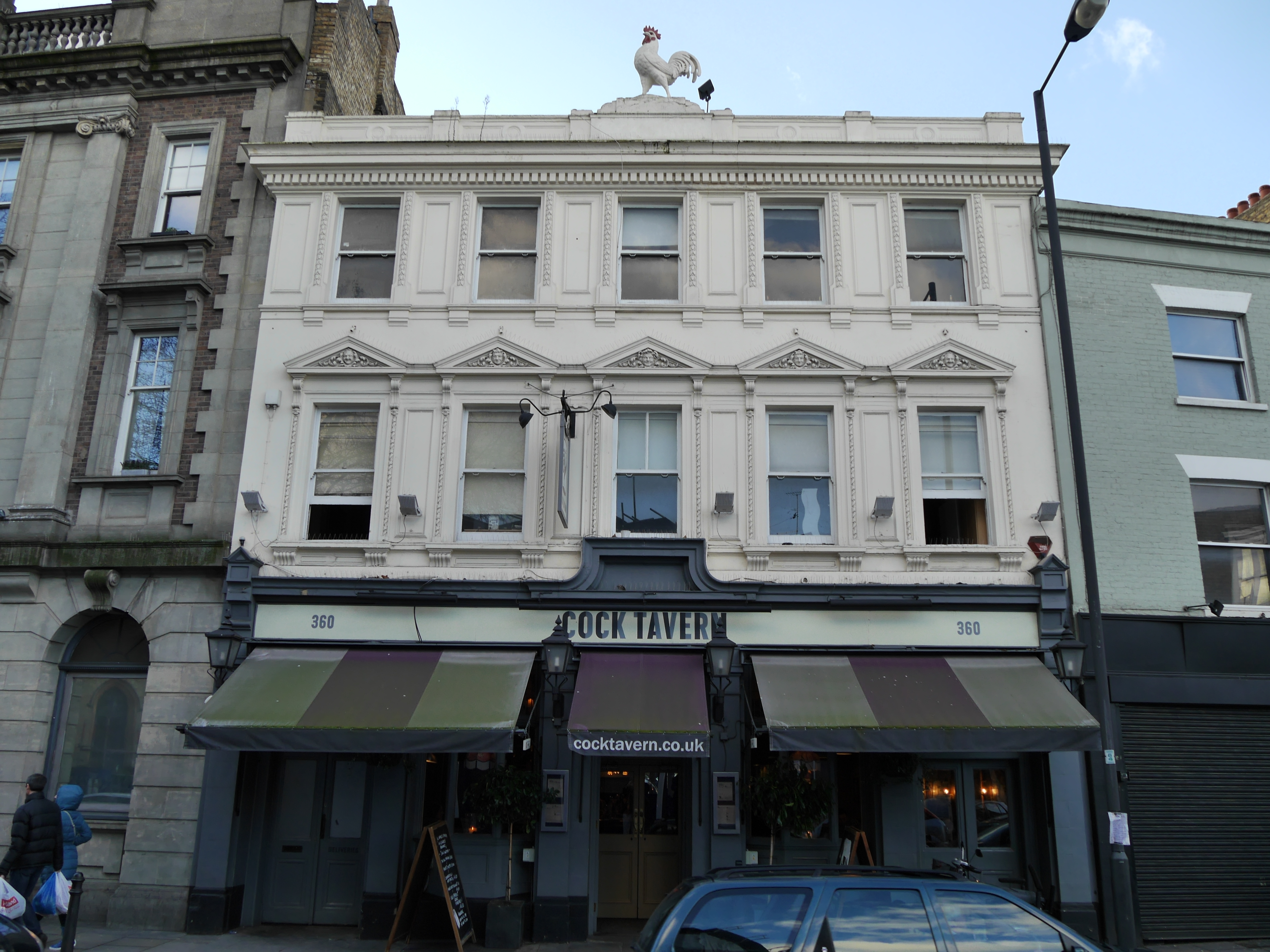
The Cock, 2014

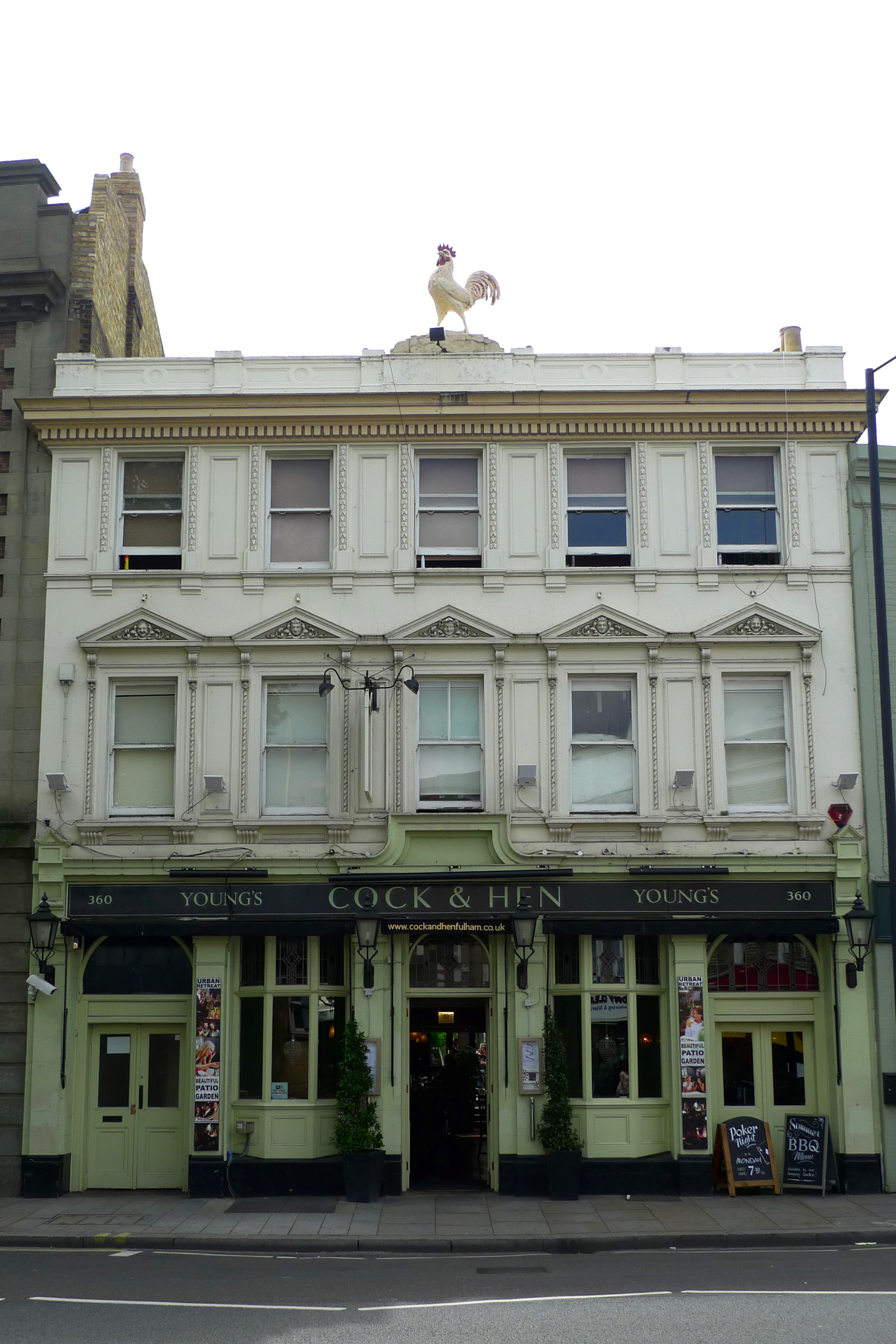
The Cock & Hen, 2009

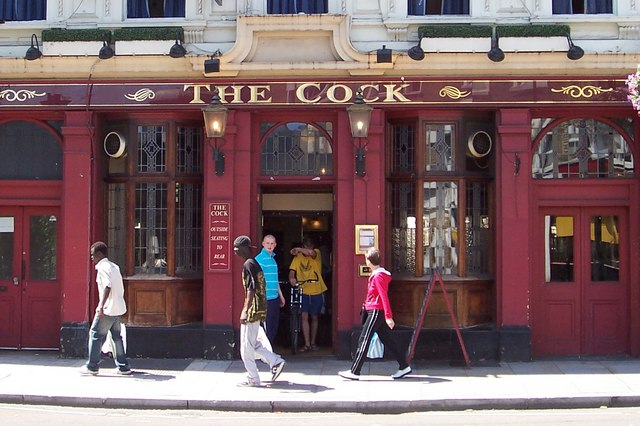
The Cock, 2006

The Cock is a Grade II listed public house at 360 North End Road, Fulham, London.

It was built in the mid-late 19th century, but the architect is not known.

Since 2012, it is called the "Cock Tavern", and is part of the Young's pub chain.

From February 2007 to 2012, it was a brewpub, the "Cock & Hen", owned by The Capital Pub Company. Before 2007, it was "The Cock".
