= Cock and Bull =

Cock and Bull may refer to:

- Cock and bull story, far-fetched and fanciful story or tale of highly dubious validity
- Cock and Bull (book), 1992 book by Will Self
- Cock and Bull (film), 2016 Chinese film
- A Cock and Bull Story, 2005 British film
