= Coque =

Coque or Coques can refer to:

== People ==
- Gonzales Coques, a Flemish baroque painter.
- Coque Malla, a Spanish musician and actor.
- Oliver De Coque, a musician
- Inofre Coque the first British governor of Mumbai during the British Raj.

== Places ==
- Grosses Coques, Nova Scotia, community located in Digby County, Nova Scotia.
- d'Coque National Sports and Culture Centre in Kirchberg, Luxembourg City, Luxembourg.

== Things ==
- The plural of Coca (pastry). (See also Valencian cuisine and Catalan cuisine)
- A shell as in the monocoque design of modern aircraft and cars.
