= KOC =

KOC and Koc may refer to:

- Kingdom of Croatia, a medieval kingdom
- Kings of Convenience, a Norwegian indie musical group
- Knights of Columbus, a Roman Catholic fraternal order
- Kodiak College, a college located in Kodiak, Alaska
- Kuwait Oil Company, one of the biggest oil companies in the world
- Korean Olympic Committee, represents South Korea in handling international affairs related to the Olympic Movement
- "Knights of Cydonia", a song by the British band Muse
- Kingdom of Comfort, a Delirious? album
- Kingdoms of Camelot, an online game by Kabam
- Kevin O'Connell, an American football coach and former player
- ISO 639-3 code for Kpati language
- Soil Organic Carbon-Water Partitioning Coefficient, the ratio of the adsorbed organic analyte to the dissolved
- King of Culinary (KOC), a Singaporean culinary game show
- Adam Koc, Polish politician
- Marcelo Koc, Argentine composer
- Maria Koc, Polish politician

== See also ==
- Koç, a Turkish name
