= The Cock, St Albans =

Public house in Hertfordshire, England

Coordinates: 51°45′16″N 0°20′10″W

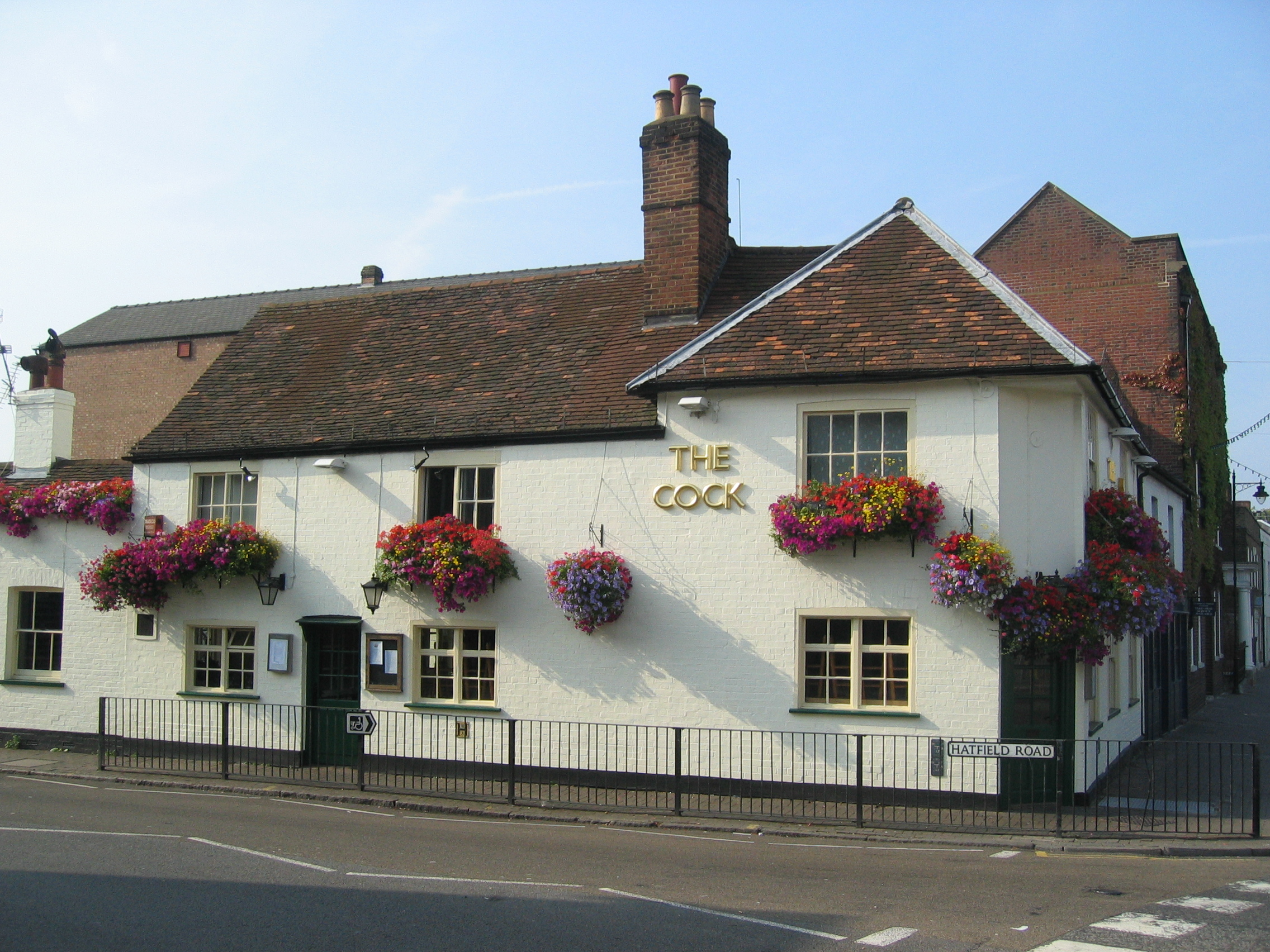
The Cock

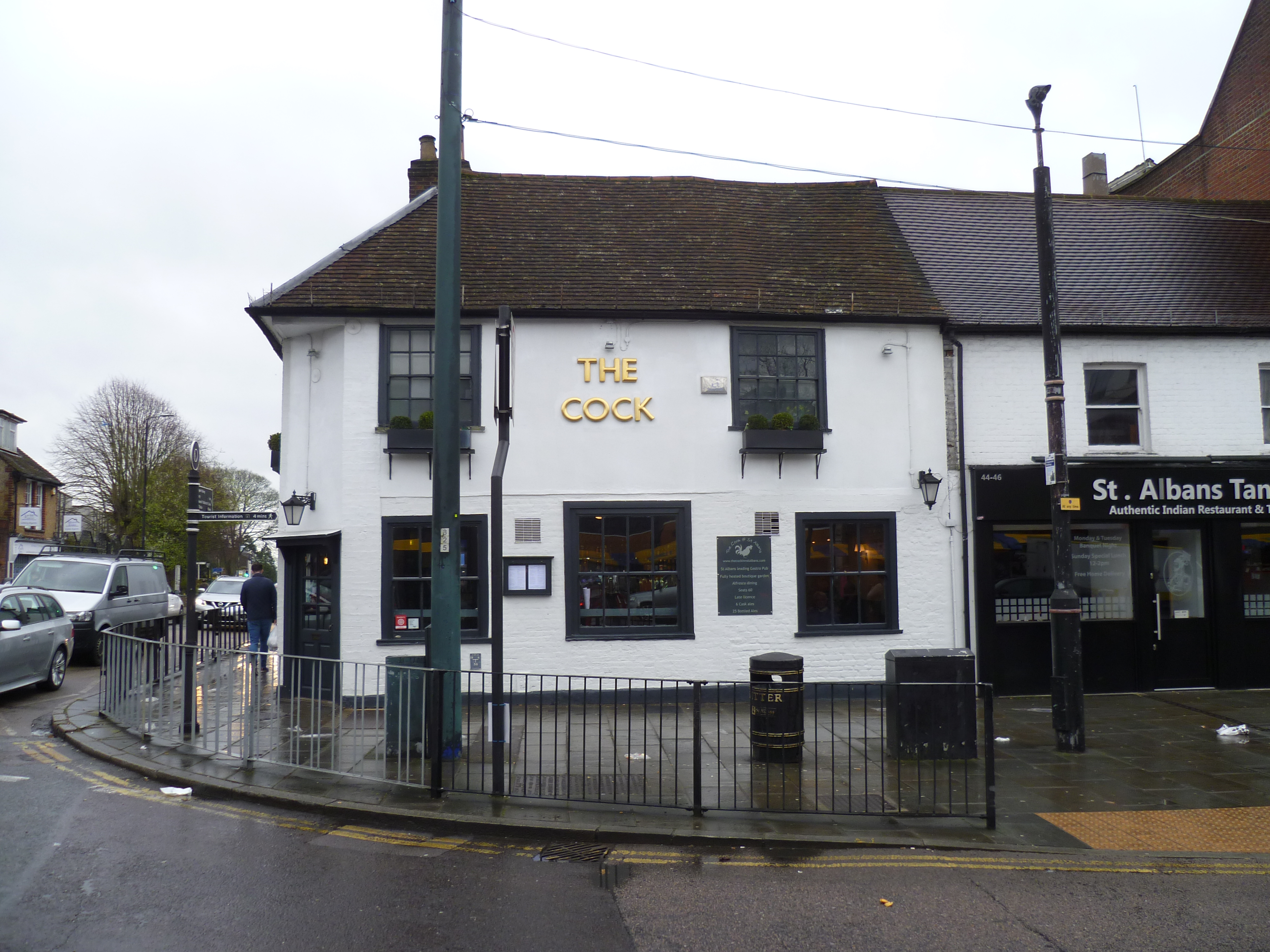
The Cock

The Cock is a public house in St Albans, Hertfordshire, England.

The grade II listed building dates back to around 1600 and has some timber framing.
