= Farrow and Jackson =

London engineering, manufacturing and distribution company

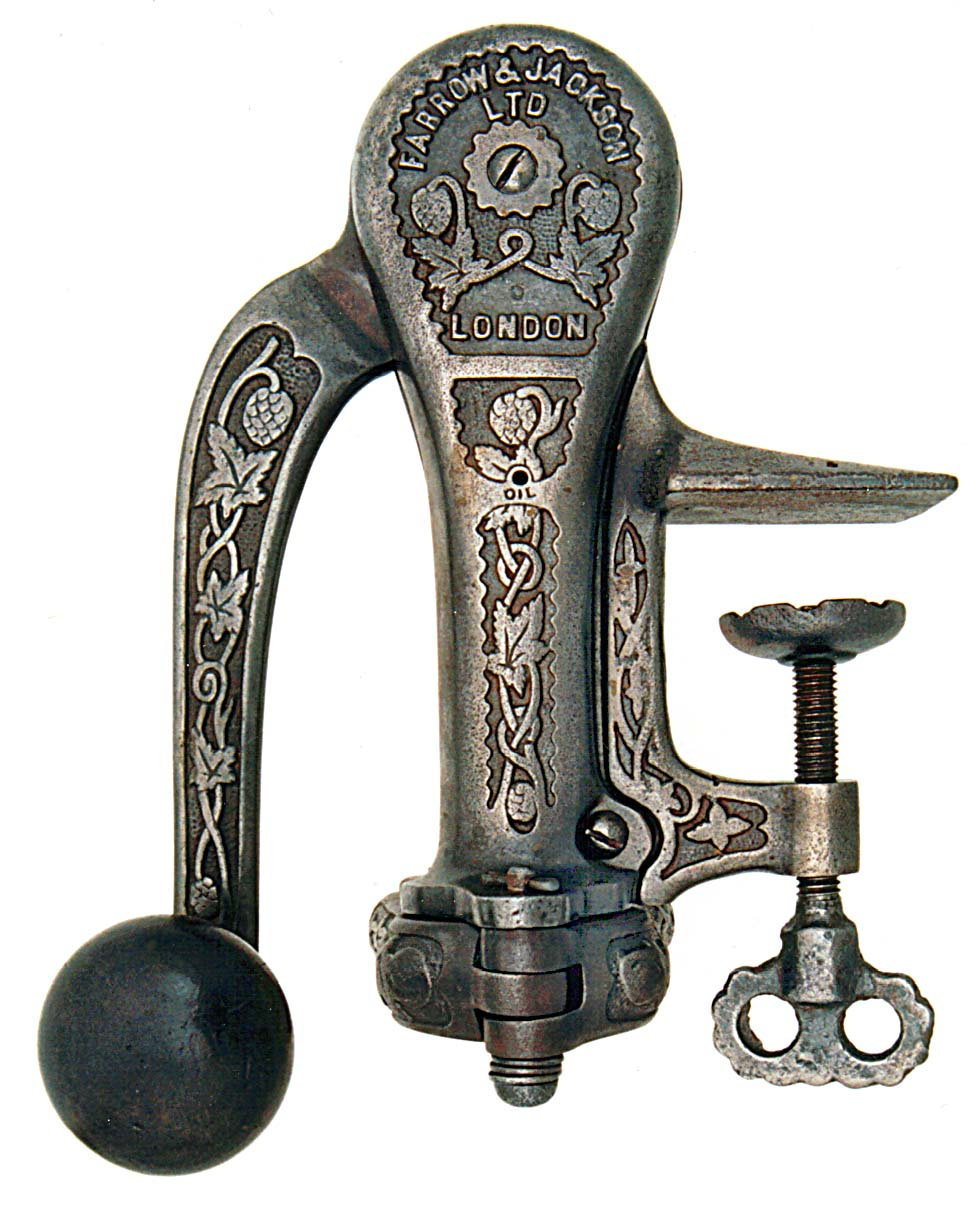
A mounted corkscrew sold by Farrow and Jackson

Farrow and Jackson was a London engineering, manufacturing and distribution company supplying equipment and merchandise to the wines, spirits and aerated beverages trades for more than a century starting in about 1860.

== At First, Farrow ==
The firm's founder, Benjamin Baldry Farrow, was born in 1774 at Diss, Norfolk, and by 1803 was listed in Kent's directory as a “tinplate-worker” at 18, Great Tower-Street, London. Company catalogues and advertising put the date of the establishment of his business at 1778.

On January 22, 1805, Farrow was admitted into the Freedom of the City of London as an “armourer and brazier”. He continued work as a tinplate worker and was so listed in Kent's 1823 directory

He was manufacturing the iron wine bins for which the company would be renowned as early as 1824, and invented a method of building fire-proof buildings, receiving letters patent (No. 5097) for an “Improvement or improvements in buildings, calculated to render them less likely to be destroyed or injured by fire than heretofore” on February 19, 1825. At this time he was known as an ironmonger.

Farrow's establishment was “A Freehold Estate, situate No. 18, Great Tower-street, the corner of Harp-lane; consisting of a shop, with countinghouse, 4 rooms over, and 2 attics. Also No. 1, Harp-lane, in the rear of the above; consisting of a warehouse of 4 floors. Both are let to Mr. Benjamin Farrow, a highly respectable tenant, under an agreement for a lease of 21 years from Lady-day, 1827, at the yearly rent of £70, clear of all deductions.”

Benjamin Farrow had married Mary Algar in September, 1798; they had eight children. The last, Charles, was born in 1815, and he would grow up to take over the family business.

Charles Farrow was twenty-nine in 1844 when his father died. In his turn, he was admitted into the Freedom of the city as an armourer and brazier. He married Ann Hinton, daughter of coal merchant and wharfinger William Samuel Hinton of Southwark in 1846. By 1850, Charles Farrow's trade was described as “ironmonger, wine bin & wine coopers’ tool maker.”

Farrow took part in the Great Exhibition of 1851. His advertisement in the Exhibition Guide shows how his manufacturing and distribution business had branched out, describing him as “Ironmonger, Smith, Brazier, Tinman, and Gas-Fitter; Manufacturer of Machines, Tools, and Utensils for the Wine and Spirit Trade”. At this time he was offering for sale a wide variety of lab equipment, bottling and corking apparatus, cellar lamps and candlesticks, woodworking tools, glass pipettes and India rubber hoses. Farrow presented his bottling and corking machine at the Paris Exposition Universelle in 1855, and his “Patent Elutriator, for Decanting Wine, &c.” at the Royal Society's 1858 Exhibition of Inventions.

Few items from that time can be found marked with Farrow's name. Porcelain labels for wine bins and three types of corkscrew have survived.

The Farrows had three children, two of whom lived to adulthood. Son Charles Hinton Farrow, born in 1848, would join the firm, which was soon to include a partner.

== Farrow and Jackson ==
Richard Brooker Jackson was born in 1824 in Hertford, one of twelve children. Jackson worked as a grocer but was an ironmonger - possibly with Farrow - at the time of his marriage to Anna Maria Perkins in 1853. They had seven children; their son Algernon would eventually join the firm.

Jackson's name is first seen in association with Charles Farrow's in an 1860 advertisement for wrought iron wine bins. For the next decade, the firm advertised regularly in London newspapers. Most ads featured their custom wrought iron wine bins. In 1865, they announced an expansion: “FARROW and JACKSON, manufacturers of wrought-iron wine bins, registered cellular bins, machines, tools, and utensils for the wine and spirit trade, beg respectfully to inform their west-end customers and the public that, in addition to their old-established to their premises in Great Tower-street, city, and their factory in Mansell-street, they have opened a branch at No. 8, Haymarket, where they solicit an inspection of cellars fitted with every variety of winebins.” Advertisements in 1867 characterized the business as "Wine and Spirit Merchants' Engineers." In 1869 came an expansion to Paris with an agent at 23, Rue de Pont Neuf, and "every article required for wine, from the press to crush the grapes to the decanting machine for the table."

After the 1875 publication of a 128-page revised and updated catalogue, the newspaper ads ceased until their success at the 1884 London Exhibition. But they were well-enough known that real estate agents would point out the Farrow & Jackson cellar fittings in homes for sale. No less an authority than the renowned Mrs. Isabella Beeton, in her 1879 Housewife's Treasury of Domestic Information, cautioned the Victorian homeowner that “in the wine cellar the patent wine-bin is now a necessity.” She quoted directly from the Farrow & Jackson catalogue, referring to their 1861-patented Cellular Bin and their 1865 patented Exhibit Wine-bin.

While custom wines bins were always their specialty as manufacturers, Farrow and Jackson also catered to wine and spirit merchants who might buy a cask of some alcoholic beverage with a view to retailing the contents. Once a barrel was purchased, they sold a stand to set it on, a gimlet for sampling it, a tool to get the bung out and a tap to replace it, an apparatus to tilt it, and cooper's tools to rebuild it. As to the liquid, they sold a cylinder to pour it in, a hydrometer to test it, bottles to fill with it, bottling machines, corks to keep it in along with machines to cut, brand and insert them, capsules to put over top and capsuling machines to do that job, then labels and label gumming machines. They sold crates in which to ship filled bottles and machines to clean the empties. For a sampling room to entice prospective buyers, they offered decanters, bottle holders, corkscrews, mahogany tasting stands to hold thirty glasses and the glasses to stock it with, and a spittoon to keep the floor clean.

For the Champagne or carbonated water business, all necessary equipment was available. Brewers were supplied with everything from grain shovels to lager beer engines. From Farrow & Jackson one could buy a bread slicer, an ice cream freezer, a tea pot, a newspaper rack, a sausage warmer and a rosewood hammer for chairing meetings.

It is unknown when he joined the company, but in 1880, Charles Hinton Farrow left his father Charles and Richard Brooker Jackson to direct the firm without him. In 1884, Charles Farrow died, and his brothers-in-law William and John Hinton carried on as directors in their capacity as his executors. The management restructured and they retired at the end of 1885. The new partnership consisted of Richard Brooker Jackson, his son Algernon Brooker Jackson, and Algar George Farrow, Charles Farrow's nephew.

Algernon Brooker Jackson had been training from his youth to qualify for his new position. He was educated in Germany and Switzerland as well as at University College, London. He studied theoretical engineering at the University of Hanover and apprenticed with engineering companies for seven years before coming to work at Farrow & Jackson in 1885. He became a member of the Institution of Mechanical Engineers before the end of the century.

The demand for carbonated waters, plain and flavoured, had been increasing through the 1800s. Charles Farrow's 1873 patent dealt with closures for aerated liquids. In 1890 Farrow & Jackson principals were involved in the formation of the Volcanic-Aëration Company (Limited) whose goal was to sell their patented equipment to supply carbonated drinks on draught. Algernon Jackson was named as managing director. Later that year a second company, the North-Western Volcanic-Aëration Company, had been formed and was advertising in the “Agencies and Commissions” columns for agents to call on brewers, chemists, licensed victuallers and grocers in the north and west counties.

Richard Brooker Jackson died in 1891.

The title page of Farrow & Jackson's comprehensive 1894 catalogue describes them as "Manufacturers of Iron Wine Bins, Cellar and Bar Fittings, Bottle Wax, Seals, &c., Aerated Water and Beer Carbonating Machinery, Patent Beer Raising Apparatus, Brewers' and Bottlers' Requisites, &c." It displays their Royal Warrants to supply cellar equipment to Queen Victoria and Prince Albert.

In 1897, Farrow & Jackson became a limited liability company with Algernon Brooker Jackson as managing director.

The 1898 centenary catalogue of Farrow & Jackson Limited fills nearly 200 pages with supplies that now include necessities for catering and for "iced drink sundries." Nine pages are devoted to their specialty, wine bins, which by that time had been supplied to a number or royal households including Buckingham Palace, St James's Palace, Marlborough House, Sandringham House, York House and Clarence House.

In 1902, Farrow & Jackson published "American and Other Iced Drinks" featuring recipes for cocktails and illustrations of the necessary hardware to make them. The 1922 catalogue emphasizes the company's supplying the "Mineral Water, Bottling, Catering, and Hotel and Restaurant Trades".

Algernon Jackson died in 1925. His obituary noted that the firm of Farrow & Jackson “were the first to introduce into this country and bring into general commercial use liquefied carbonic acid gas.”

In 1930, a new company, Farrow & Jackson & Purdy Ltd., was registered to acquire the assets of Farrow & Jackson and to form a Purdy Patent Machinery Company to not only carry on the business but also expand into the manufacture and distribution of “agricultural implements, conveyors, and other machinery” and “chemicals and other preparations.” However, the Farrow & Jackson name was still prominent, as in this 1957 newspaper advertisement: “TAKE CARE OF YOUR WINES by storing in our inexpensive wine bins. Any size or shape made to order, triangular to fit under stairs if necessary. Farrow & Jackson Ltd. Dept R P 41-42 Prescot street, London E1.”

As recently as 1974, journalist and Guardian wine writer John Arlott promoted Farrow & Jackson in his columns, and referred in the present tense to their production of custom wine bins: “The best known racks in this country are those produced by Farrow & Jackson in square, single-bottle openings of metal secured by wooden corner pieces. They are strong and secure and can be slanted or staggered to fit under the stairs or in any asymmetrical recess in the house.”

== Inventions & Patents ==
With two exceptions noted, the patent information is found in the British National Archives.

- 1825 Feb 19 (Benjamin Farrow) - No. 5097: Improvement or improvements in buildings, calculated to render them less likely to be destroyed or injured by fire than heretofore
- 1851 Apr 23 (Charles Farrow) - No. 3227 (Useful Registered Design): Self-closing valve
- 1861 Dec 31 (Charles Farrow) - No. 1725: Apparatus for Applying Capsules to the Necks of Bottles and other Vessels
- 1861 Mar 1 (Farrow & Jackson) - No. 4343 (Useful Reg’d Design): Bottle rack [Cellular]
- 1862 Jun 20 (Farrow & Jackson) - No. 4490 (Useful Reg’d Design): A screw bottle stopper
- 1865 Feb 22 (Farrow & Jackson) - No. 4695 (Useful Reg’d Design): Bottle rack [Exhibit]
- 1865 Nov 9 (Farrow & Jackson) - No. 4753 (Useful Reg’d Design): Apparatus for corking bottles
- 1866 Jun 29 (Farrow & Jackson) - No. 4797 (Useful Reg’d Design): A filter for filtering wine
- 1867 Jul 27 (Farrow & Jackson) - No. 4874 (Useful Reg’d Design): A stand or holder for drinking glasses
- 1868 May 13 (Charles Farrow) - No. 1558: Apparatus for cleansing bottles, jars and casks
- 1870 Mar 23 (Charles Farrow & Richard Brooker Jackson) - (Application) No. 854: Construction of iron wine bins
- 1872 Nov 16 (Richard Brooker Jackson) - No. 3427: Improvements in Racks for Bottles [The Exhibition]
- 1873 Jan 18 (Charles Farrow) - No. 218 [provisional patent]: Improvements in stoppering bottles for aerated or gaseous liquids
- 1881 May 31 (Charles Farrow & Richard Brooker Jackson) - No. 2400: Improvements in apparatus or stands for holding bottles containing effervescent and still liquids
- 1883 July 21 (Richard Brooker Jackson) - No. 3594: An improved box or case for parcels post and like purposes
- 1885 Apr 28 (Richard Brooker Jackson) - No. 5238: Improvements in corkscrews
- 1890 Mar 31 (Algar George Farrow) - No. 2124: An improved process and means for the aeration, bottling, and discharge of beers and other liquids.
- 1911 Feb 7 (Algernon Brooker Jackson) - US Pat. No. 1,011,963: Apparatus for the delivery of aerated liquids from bulk

== Exhibitions & Awards ==
The awards up to 1896 are listed on the title page of Farrow & Jackson's 1898 catalogue.

- 1851 – Honourable Mention, Great Exhibition, London (Charles Farrow)
- 1855 – Honourable Mention, Exposition Universelle, Paris (Charles Farrow)
- 1862 – Honourable Mention, International Exhibition, London (Farrow & Jackson from here on)
- 1867 – Honourable Mention, Exposition Universelle, Paris
- 1872 – Special Medals for Economic Appliances, Paris
- 1873 – Medal for Merit, Vienna World's Fair
- 1875 – 2nd Prize and Honourable Mention, Chilean International Exhibition
- 1880 – Medal and 5 awards, Sydney International Exhibition
- 1884 – Gold Medal Award, International Exhibition, London
- 1896 – Gold Medal, Brewers’ Exhibition, London
- 1901 - Gold Medal for Counter Fountains, Universal Food and Cookery Exhibition
