= The Cockpit, City of London =

Pub in the City of London

The Cockpit
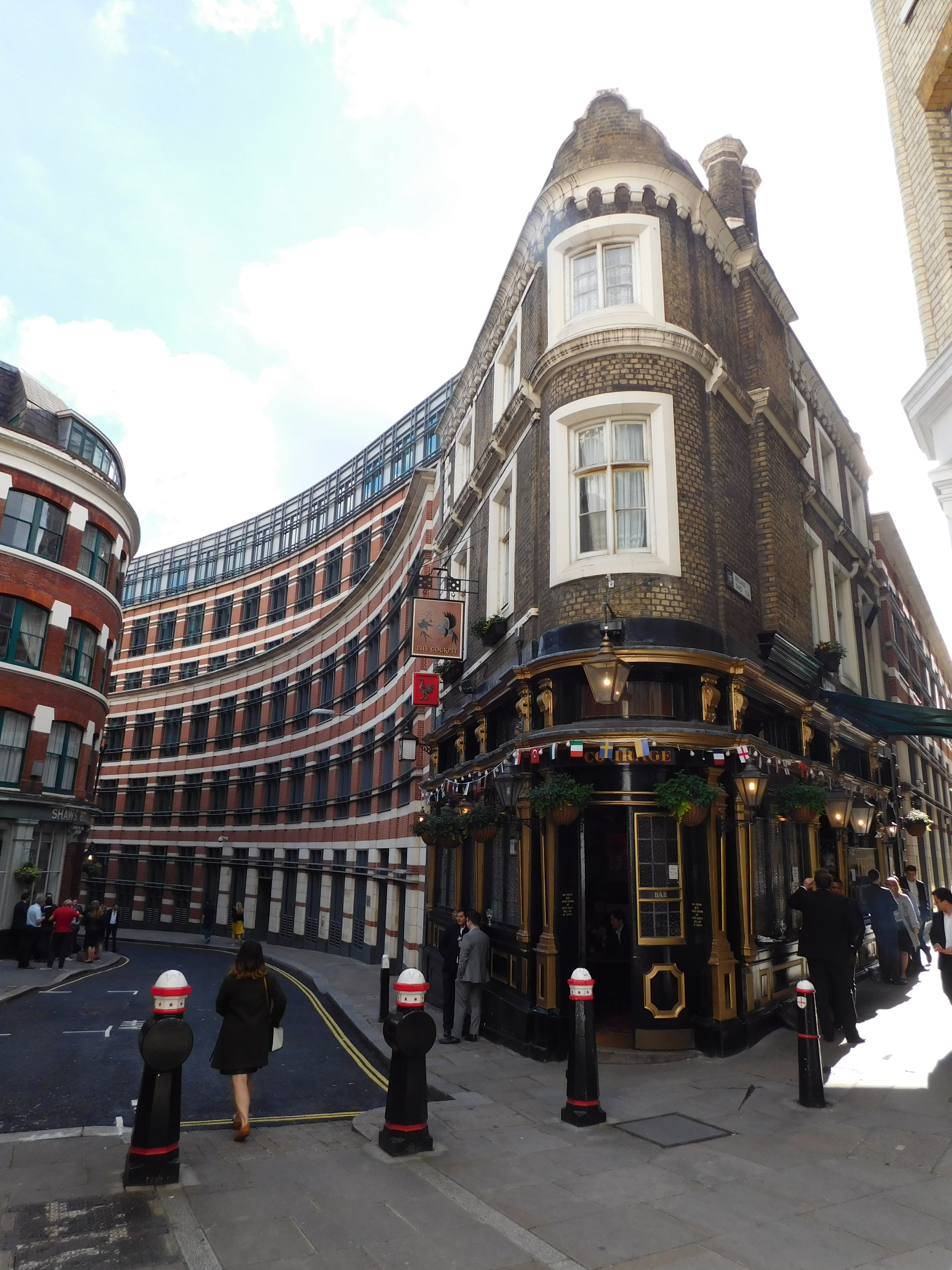
- The building in 2016

- Location within Greater London
- Former names: The Cock Pit; The Three Castles

General information
- Location: St Andrew's Hill, London EC4.
- Coordinates: 51°30′46″N 0°06′05″W

The Cockpit is a circa 1860 pub on St Andrew's Hill, in the City of London, where it meets Ireland Yard. Formerly named The Cock Pit, having hosted cockfights, it became The Three Castles in the mid-19th century. It was given its current name in 1970, after a renovation.

There has been a pub on the site since the 16th century, at around the time William Shakespeare bought a house nearby. It is one of over 600 listed buildings in the City of London; it is listed as Grade II, the lowest and most common listing.
