= Tree hole =

Tree hole may refer to:

- A tree hollow, a natural cavity in a tree.
- A tree throw, a cavity left in the soil after a tree has fallen or otherwise been removed.
- A tree mould hole, Formed by lava burning out the tree but retaining the exterior shape and form.
