= Lee Frelich =

Ecologist, academic, and author

Lee E. Frelich
- Occupations: Ecologist, academic, and author

Academic background
- Education: B.S., Botany and Bacteriology; Ph.D., Forest Ecology
- Alma mater: University of Wisconsin-Madison

Lee E. Frelich is an ecologist, academic, and author. He is the director of the Center for Forest Ecology and an adjunct professor in the Department of Forest Resources at the University of Minnesota.

Frelich is most known for his work on forest disturbance dynamics. His work also deals with climate change, herbivory, and the ecological effects of invasive earthworms.

As of 2025, Frelich's work has been cited 9400 times according to Scopus.

== Education and career ==
Frelich completed his B.S. in Botany and Bacteriology in 1980 from the University of Wisconsin-Madison. Later in 1986, he completed his Ph.D. in Forest Ecology from the same institution. He has been the director of the University of Minnesota Center for Forest Ecology since 2000 and is also an adjunct professor in the Department of Forest Resources since 2022.

== Research ==
In his early research, Frelich investigated natural disturbance patterns in Upper Michigan's old-growth forests. For this purpose, he employed tree ring analysis to quantify canopy accession dates and revealed canopy residence times (145–175 years) and persistent disturbance rates (5.7-6.9% per decade). He worked on the Neighborhood Effect Theory of Forest Response to Disturbance and Succession, also known as the cusp catastrophe theory of forest dynamics, emphasizing that the dynamics within the forest ecosystem, influenced by relationships between different tree layers as well as their spatial interactions with adjacent trees, contribute significantly towards forest succession and resilience.

Frelich also led the research on the consequences of invasive earthworms from Asia and Europe on plant communities and forest ecosystems in the boreal and temperate regions of North America. He also explored the rapid transformation of boreal forests due to climate change, highlighting the nonlinear and complex nature of forest transitions, and indicated that future changes may be widespread, more sudden as well and ecologically more disruptive than what gradual climate models generally suggest. Additionally, he also studied the disturbances in Minnesota's Boundary Waters Canoe Area Wilderness. He demonstrated that while boreal forests showed some resistance, frequent disturbances altered the forest's structure and composition, resulting in the replacement of evergreen coniferous forests by deciduous birch and aspen forests.

== Bibliography ==
=== Books ===
- Frelich, Lee E. (2002). Forest Dynamics and Disturbance Regimes: Studies from Temperate Evergreen-Deciduous Forests. Cambridge University Press. ISBN 9780511542046.

=== Selected articles ===
- Lorimer, C. G.; Frelich, L. E. (1989). "A methodology for estimating canopy disturbance frequency and intensity in dense temperate forests". Canadian Journal of Forest Research. 19 (5): 651–663. doi:10.1139/x89-102.
- Frelich, L. E.; Lorimer, C. G. (1991). "Natural disturbance regimes in hemlock-hardwood forests of the upper Great Lakes region". Ecological Monographs. 61 (2): 145–164. doi:10.2307/1943005. JSTOR 1943005.
- Johnstone, J. F.; Allen, C. D.; Franklin, J. F.; Frelich, L. E.; Harvey, B. J.; Higuera, P. E.; Turner, M. G. (2016). "Changing disturbance regimes, ecological memory, and forest resilience". Frontiers in Ecology and the Environment. 14 (7): 369–378. doi:10.1002/fee.1311.
- Dyderski, M. K.; Paź, S.; Frelich, L. E.; Jagodziński, A. M. (2018). "How much does climate change threaten European forest tree species distributions?". Global Change Biology. 24 (3): 1150–1163. doi:10.1111/gcb.13925. PMID 28991410.
