= Stratton Park Moated Enclosure =

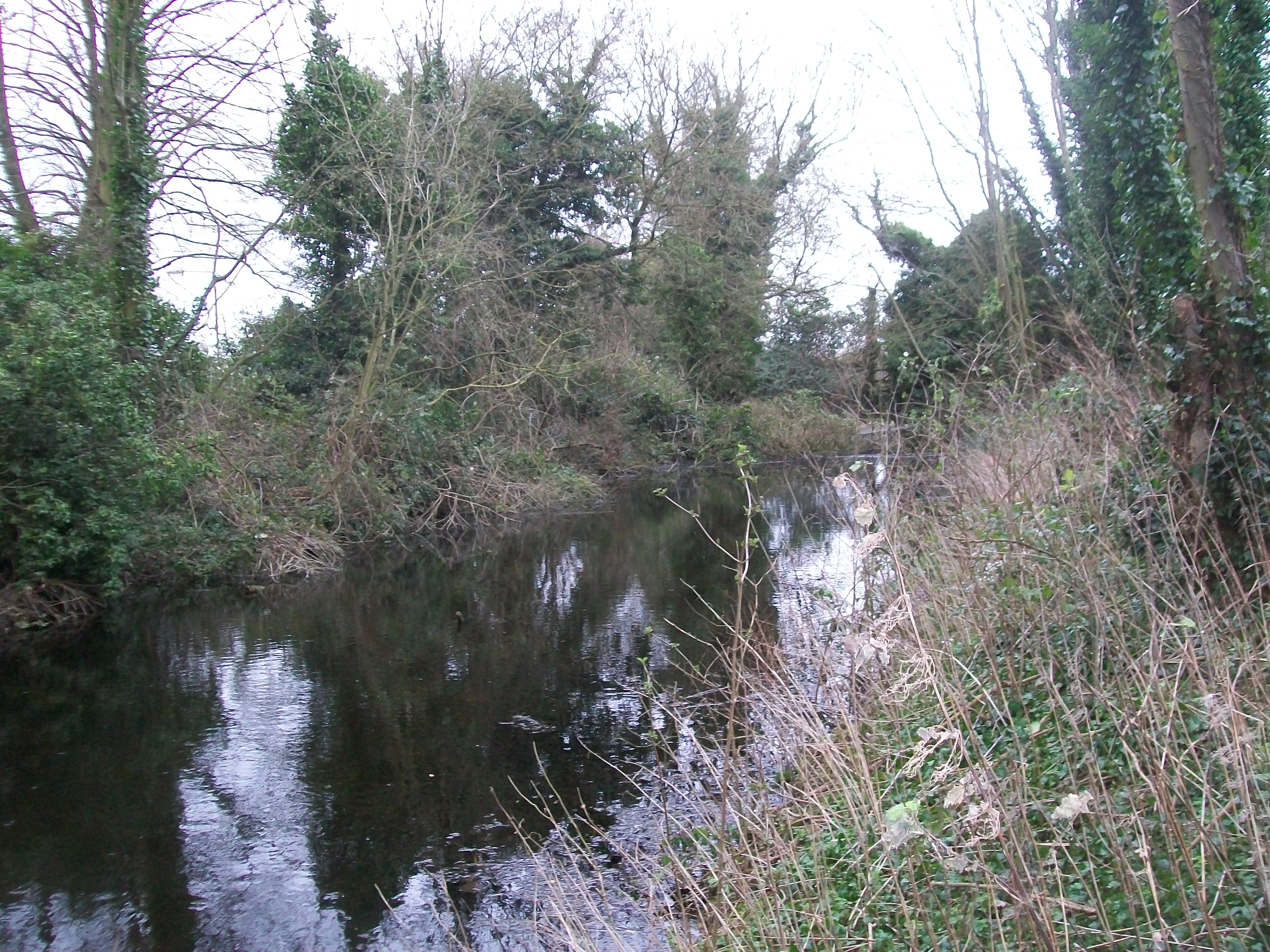
- A view of the moat opposite the causewayed entrance

- Location in Bedfordshire
- 52.0793°N 0.236237°W
- Location: Bedfordshire, England, UK

Stratton Park Moated Enclosure (locally known as and sometimes informally referred to as Stratton Moat, also sometimes referred to as Stratton Park Moated Enclosure and Associated Manorial Earthworks or Stratton Manor Moat) is a scheduled ancient monument formed of a moat ditch circuit, counterscarp bank, central platform and walled garden compound located on the south-east edge of Biggleswade, Bedfordshire in the United Kingdom. Described by a 1982–83 survey of the landscape and wildlife features at Biggleswade as "one of the most exciting areas seen during the survey" and by English Heritage as "a site of regional significance", the moated enclosure consists of a number of earthwork features discovered through topographical analysis. Classified by the Royal Commission on the Historical Monuments of England as a Class A: Homestead Moat site, the moated enclosure is not currently open to the general public.

== History ==
The site marks the ancient manor of Stratton. A dig in the 1950s discovered evidence of walls and foundations.

A report on the site by English Heritage concluded that it was probable that the site played an integrated role in a network of settlements: "Although the moated enclosure at Stratton now survives as an isolated structure within the modern landscape of farming, housing and residential development, this is a misleading picture." In particular the site appears not to have been built for defensive purposes, but as a manorial residence, chosen for commanding location: its slight elevation makes it highly visible and overshadows its immediate environment. The evidence found at the site indicates that a manor did once stand there, along with various auxiliary buildings, like barns. In recent years, the site has been damaged by a static mobile home park, with residents of the park making cuttings into the counterscarp bank to provide themselves with parking spaces or small areas of garden.

A date for the construction of Stratton Park Moated Enclosure has not been set (the oldest artefactual material found is a piece of 11–14th century pottery); English Heritage states that the pinnacle of construction for similar sites occurred around 1250 to 1400.

== Today ==
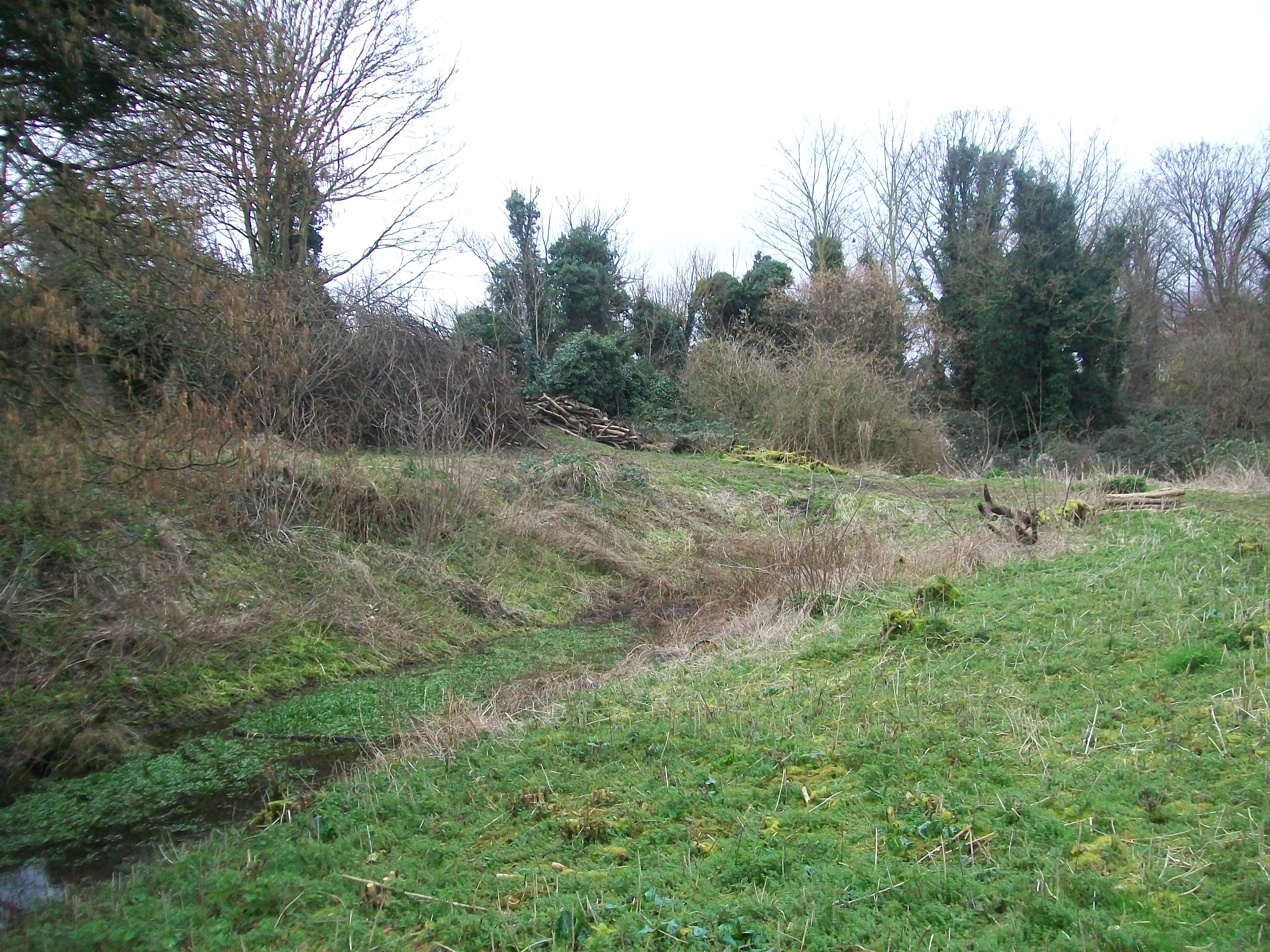
Looking to the causewayed entrance over the central platform

Stratton Park Moated Enclosure is about 60 metres (200 ft) above Ordnance Datum and consists of a moat ditch circuit, counterscarp bank, central platform and walled garden compound. Throughout winter the moat has water in it, but dries out quickly in summer; the source of the water is unknown but researchers have hypothesized that it may have been constructed near to or on top of a natural springline, as some maps show several springs and ponds in the immediate vicinity – several watercourses today flow near to (but not into) the moated enclosure. The moat's maximum width of 14 m (46 ft) is found at the north-western apex, and the moat is at its widest and deepest at the northern and eastern arms where it has a general width of 8–10 m (26–33 ft). The height of the central platform differs between 0.5–0.9 m (1 ft 8 in – 2 ft 11 in), with the greatest difference being 3.5 m (11 ft) at the north-west, west, and south-west, due to the higher scarps. The south-west corner of the moat ditch (to the western side of the causewayed entrance) circuit stands out as being of a disparate character; its much wider base of 7–11m and angular moat terminal were probably brought into being by the building and up-keep of the causewayed entrance and the effects of repeated re-workings of the moat ditch circuit.

The entire moat ditch circuit is, bar the south side, enclosed by an external counterscarp bank, the best definition being found around the western half of the site. With regards to this western counterscarp bank, two elements are distinctly visible: the first is a 7–9 m (23–30 ft) low spread platform 2 m (6 ft 7 in) above exterior ground level with subsidiary bank built on it, upon which modest evidence of ridge-and-furrow cultivation was found,^{[Note 1]} whilst the second longer southerly element is 16 m (52 ft) in length, reaches a maximum width of 6 m (20 ft) and a maximum height of 0.3 m (1 ft 0 in). A highly substantial counterscarp bank exists to the north, which is 10 m (33 ft) at its widest; a single elongated segment 0.5 m (1 ft 8 in) above the exterior ground surface and around 3 m (9.8 ft) above the water level in the moat ditch circuit stands. The mounds and heightenings found along this bank serve as evidence of purposeful re-working, cultivation and enhancement.

Just like the counterscarp, the 25 hectares (62 acres) trapezoidal central platform narrows from the south and widens from east to west. Only the western side of the central platform lacks a steeply defined edge to the moat ditch circuit; the ill-defined western edge could be caused by stock animals having using this side to access the water. Many marginal earthwork features are present on the central platform: scarps and banks which sub-divide the interior into quadrants, a raised rectangular terrace, a low rectangular mound with rounded corners (probably a building platform), along with more general evidence of buildings and sporadic evidence of hollowed track, the latter possibly pertaining to the moated enclosure's more recent function as an orchard, with the tracks representing the subsequent wear-and-tear the site would have received. An L-shaped mound adjacent to the entrance causeway may also be related to the site's use as an orchard/kitchen garden.

Some fruit trees survive on the central platform, along with subtler indentations which mark the positioning of former fruit trees; these indentations are technically called 'tree throws'.

== Notes ==
1. Researchers acknowledged the possibility that this 'evidence' could in fact be "an artefact of later cultivation: ploughing impacting and eroding the form of the bank: the bank may well have been used as a headland within this later field layout."
