= Old-growth forest =

Forest that has developed over a long period of time without disturbance

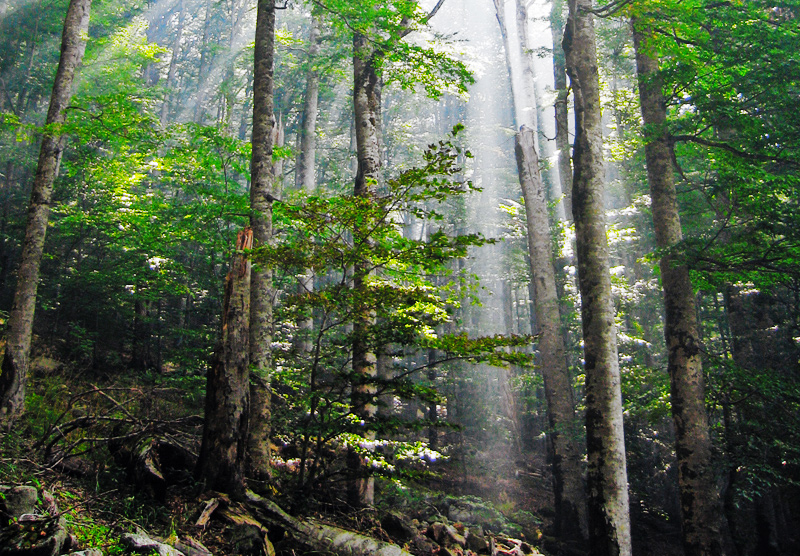
Old-growth European beech forest in Biogradska Gora National Park, Montenegro

An old-growth forest (Note: Sometimes considered synonymous with the terms primary forest, virgin forest, late seral forest, primeval forest, first-growth forest, mature forest, and doghair.) is a forest that has developed over a long period of time without disturbance. Due to this, old-growth forests exhibit unique ecological features. The Food and Agriculture Organization of the United Nations defines primary forests as naturally regenerated forests of native tree species where there are no clearly visible indications of human activity and the ecological processes are not significantly disturbed. One-third (34%) of the world's forests are primary forests. Old-growth features include diverse tree-related structures that provide diverse wildlife habitats that increases the biodiversity of the forested ecosystem. Virgin or first-growth forests are old-growth forests that have never been logged. The concept of diverse tree structure includes multi-layered canopies and canopy gaps, greatly varying tree heights and diameters, and diverse tree species and classes and sizes of woody debris.

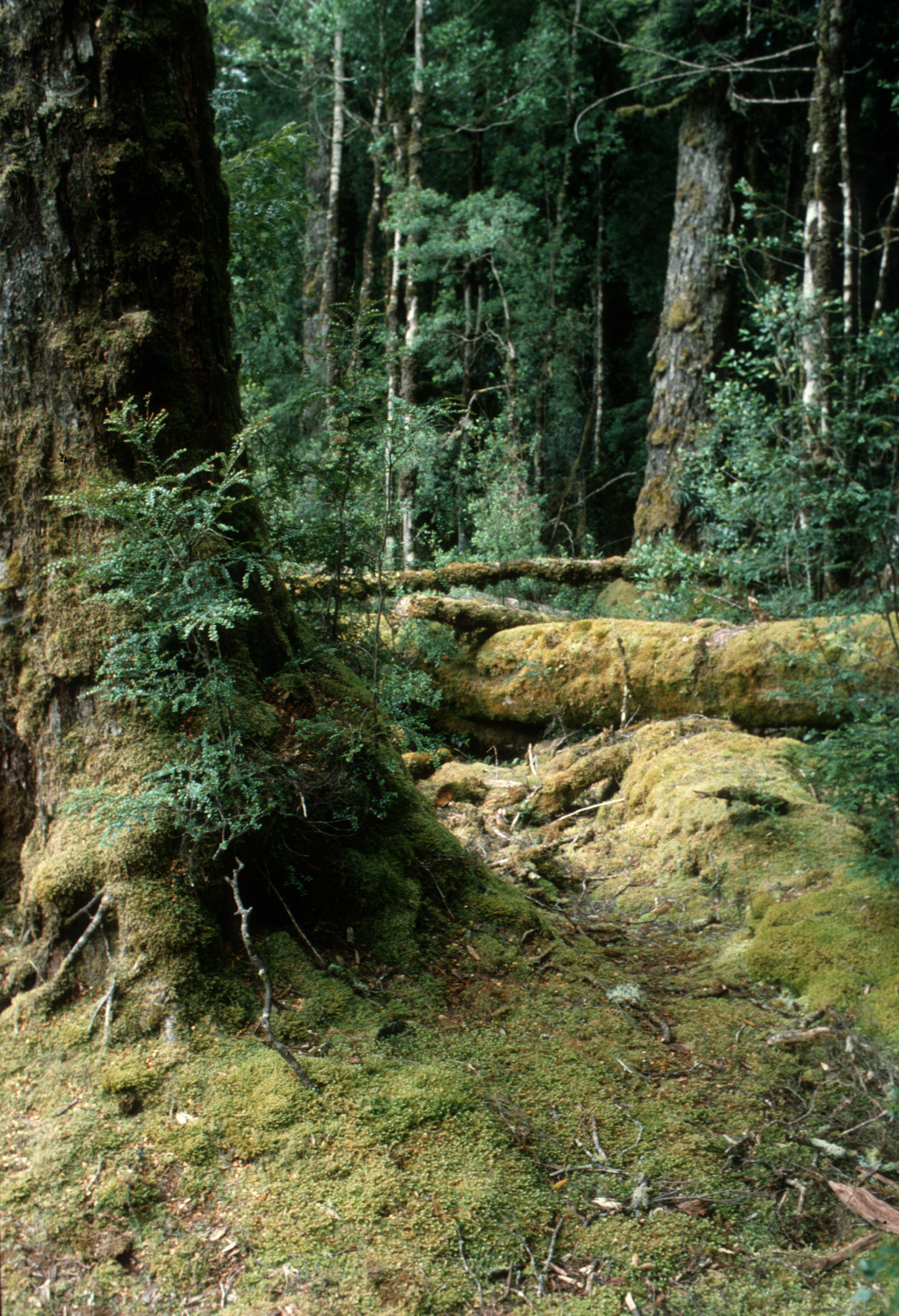
Cool temperate rainforest in Tasmania, Australia

As of 2025, the world has 11.3 million square kilometers (4.4 million square miles) of primary forest remaining. Brazil, Canada, and Russia have 62% of the world's primary forest. The net area of primary forest has decreased by 1.1 million square kilometers (~424,000 square miles) since 1990, but the rate of loss more than halved in 2010–2020 compared with the previous decade.

Old-growth forests are valuable for economic reasons and for the ecosystem services they provide. This can be a point of contention when some in the logging industry desire to harvest valuable timber from the forests, destroying the forests in the process, to generate short-term profits, while environmentalists seek to preserve the forests in their pristine state for benefits such as water purification, flood control, weather stability, maintenance of biodiversity, and nutrient cycling. Moreover, old-growth forests are more efficient at sequestering carbon than newly planted forests and fast-growing timber plantations, thus preserving these forests is vital to climate change mitigation.

== Characteristics ==
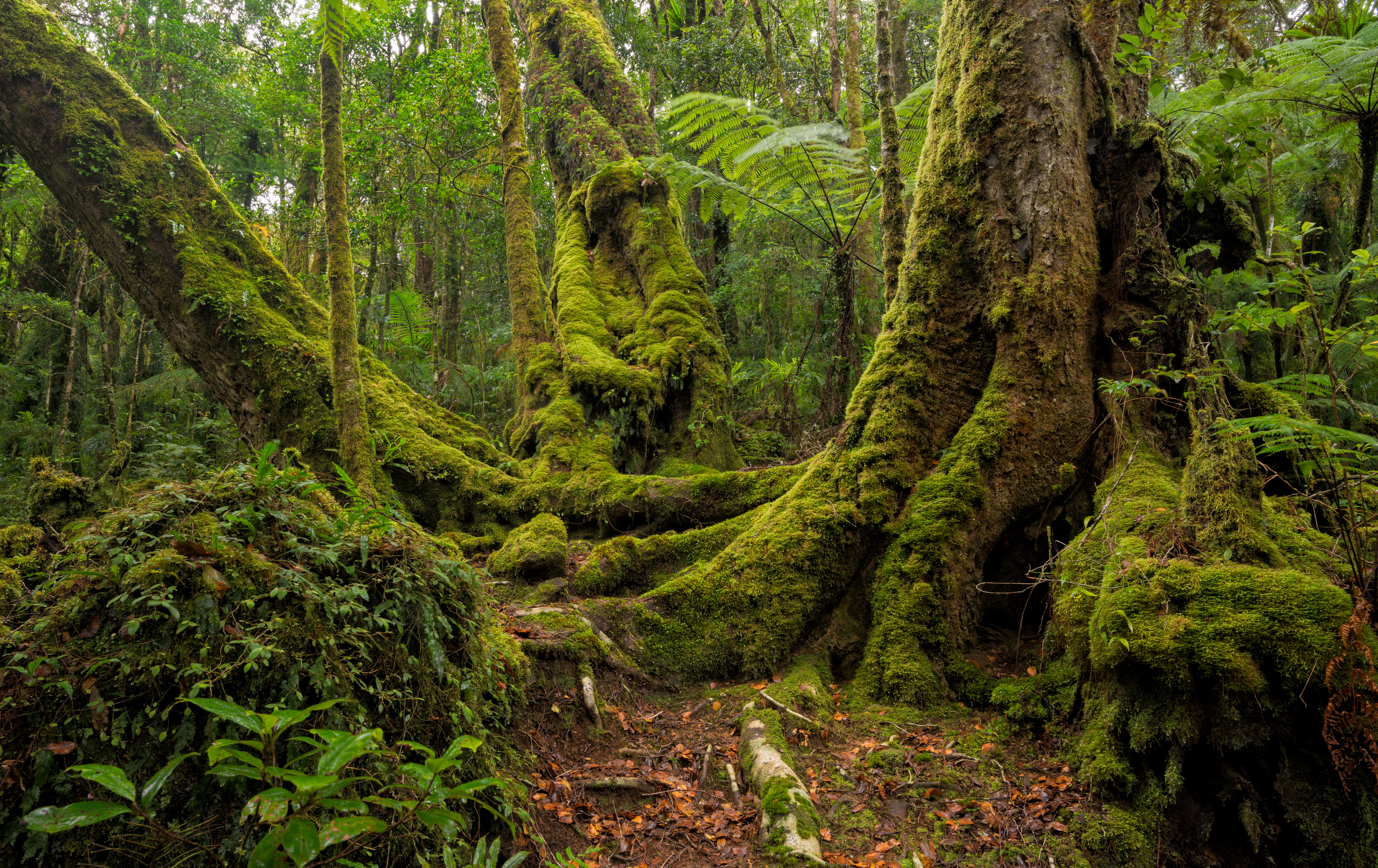
Antarctic beech old growth in Lamington National Park, Queensland, Australia

Old-growth forests tend to have large trees and standing dead trees, multilayered canopies with gaps that result from the deaths of individual trees, and coarse woody debris on the forest floor. The trees of old-growth forests develop distinctive attributes not seen in younger trees, such as more complex structures and deeply fissured bark that can harbor rare lichens and mosses.

A forest regenerated after a severe disturbance, such as wildfire, insect infestation, or harvesting, is often called second-growth or 'regeneration' until enough time passes for the effects of the disturbance to be no longer evident. Depending on the forest, this may take from a century to several millennia. Hardwood forests of the eastern United States can develop old-growth characteristics in 150–500 years. In British Columbia, Canada, old growth is defined as 120 to 140 years of age in the interior of the province where fire is a frequent and natural occurrence. In British Columbia's coastal rainforests, old growth is defined as trees more than 250 years, with some trees reaching more than 1,000 years of age. In Australia, eucalypt trees rarely exceed 350 years of age due to frequent fire disturbance.

Forest types have very different development patterns, natural disturbances and appearances. A Douglas-fir stand may grow for centuries without disturbance while an old-growth ponderosa pine forest requires frequent surface fires to reduce the shade-tolerant species and regenerate the canopy species. In the boreal forest of Canada, catastrophic disturbances like wildfires minimize opportunities for major accumulations of dead and downed woody material and other structural legacies associated with old growth conditions. Typical characteristics of old-growth forest include the presence of older trees, minimal signs of human disturbance, mixed-age stands, presence of canopy openings due to tree falls, pit-and-mound topography, down wood in various stages of decay, standing snags (dead trees), multilayered canopies, intact soils, a healthy fungal ecosystem, and presence of indicator species.

=== Biodiversity ===
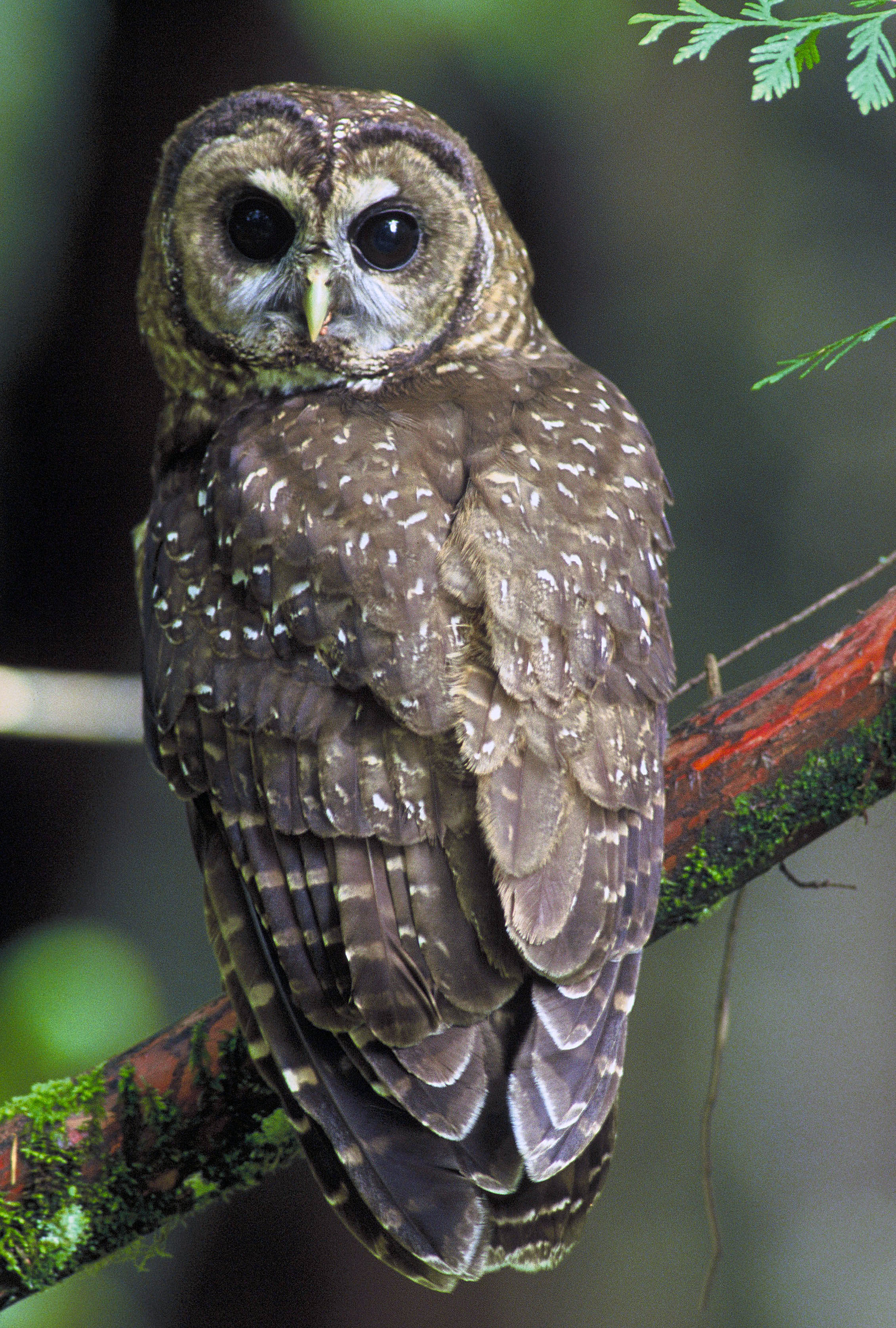
The northern spotted owl primarily inhabits old-growth forests in the northern part of its range (Canada to southern Oregon) and landscapes with a mix of old and younger forest types in the southern part of its range (the Klamath region and California).

Old-growth forests are often biologically diverse, and home to many rare species, threatened species, and endangered species of plants and animals, such as the northern spotted owl, marbled murrelet and fisher, making them ecologically significant. Levels of biodiversity may be higher or lower in old-growth forests compared to second-growth forests, depending on specific circumstances, environmental variables, and geographic variables. Logging in old-growth forests is a contentious issue in many parts of the world. Excessive logging reduces biodiversity, affecting not only the old-growth forest itself, but also indigenous species that rely upon old-growth forest habitat.

Studies in British Columbia's cedar-hemlock forests have shown that certain lichen species, particularly cyanolichens, are almost exclusively found in old-growth forests, being absent from even-aged stands (where all trees grew after a single disturbance event) of the same age (120–140 years). This suggests that true old-growth characteristics, like diverse forest structure and microclimate conditions, are necessary for some specialist species beyond just forest age.

Inland temperate rainforests of British Columbia illustrate how old-growth structure can shape entire food webs. Deep winter snowpacks lift woodland caribou into the lower tree canopy, where their survival depends on heavy accumulations of fruticose "hair" lichens such as Bryoria and Alectoria. These lichens reach stand-level "hyperabundance" only in forests older than about 120–150 years, where long-lived canopy architecture and stable microclimates allow sustained growth. Industrial logging and short-rotation silviculture fail to reproduce these conditions, so the old-growth canopy itself functions as a keystone habitat, underpinning both specialist lichens and the endangered deep-snow mountain caribou that rely on them.

=== Mixed age ===
Some forests in the old-growth stage have a mix of tree ages, due to a distinct regeneration pattern for this stage. New trees regenerate at different times from each other, because each of them has a different spatial location relative to the main canopy, hence each one receives a different amount of light. The mixed age of the forest is an important criterion in ensuring that the forest is a relatively stable ecosystem in the long term. A climax stand that is uniformly aged becomes senescent and degrades within a relatively short time to result in a new cycle of forest succession. Thus, uniformly aged stands are less stable ecosystems. Boreal forests are more uniformly aged, as they are normally subject to frequent stand-replacing wildfires.

=== Canopy openings ===
Forest canopy gaps are essential in creating and maintaining mixed-age stands. Also, some herbaceous plants only become established in canopy openings, but persist beneath an understory. Openings are a result of tree death due to small impact disturbances such as wind, low-intensity fires, and tree diseases.

Old-growth forests are unique, usually having multiple horizontal layers of vegetation representing a variety of tree species, age classes, and sizes, as well as "pit and mound" soil shape with well-established fungal nets. As old-growth forest is structurally diverse, it provides higher-diversity habitat than forests in other stages. Thus, sometimes higher biological diversity can be sustained in old-growth forests, or at least a biodiversity that is different from other forest stages.

=== Topography ===
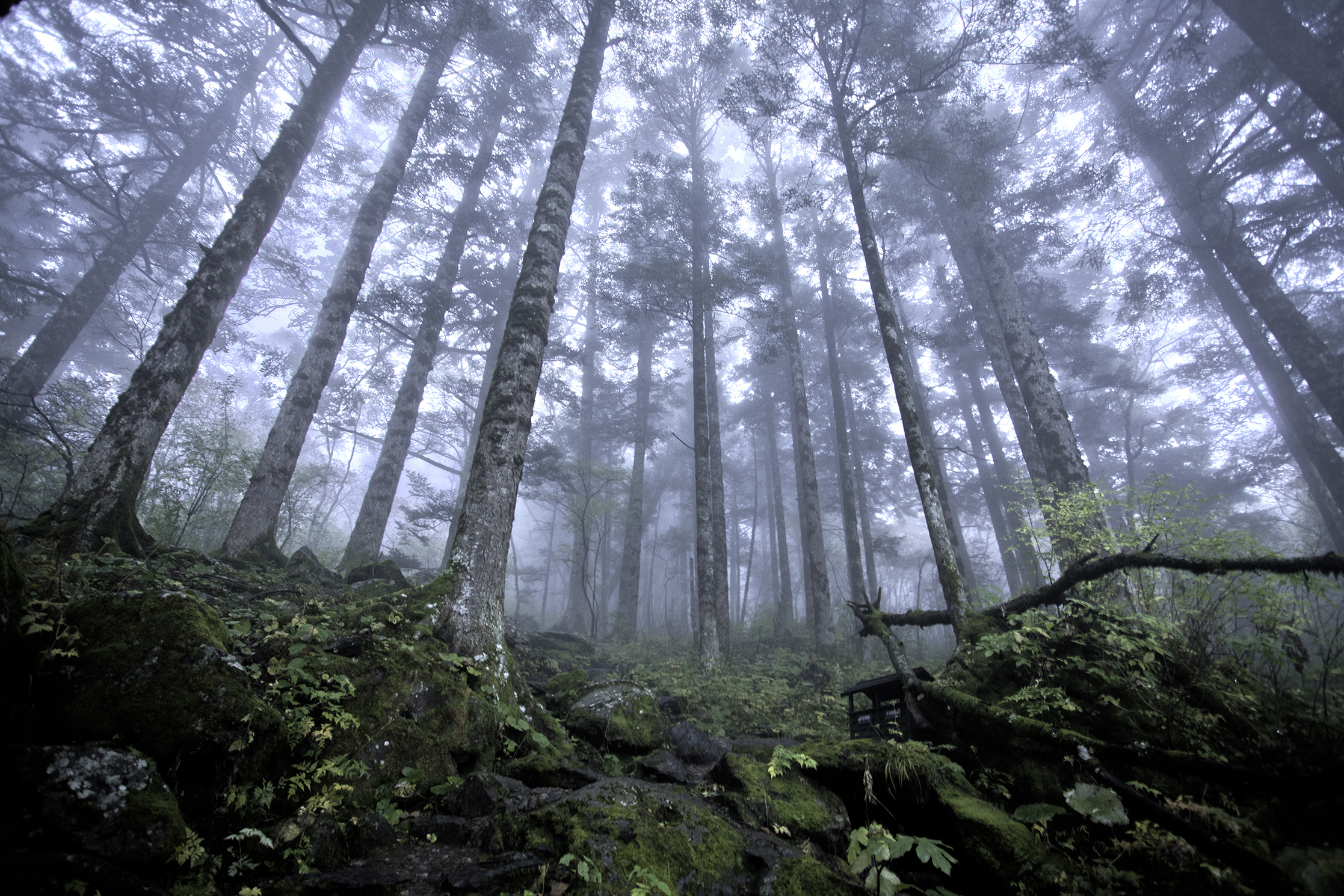
Virgin forest about 2,500 m (8,200 ft) above sea level in Shennongjia Forestry District, Hubei, China

The characteristic topography of much old-growth forest consists of pits and mounds. Mounds are caused by decaying fallen trees, and pits (tree throws) by the roots pulled out of the ground when trees fall due to natural causes, including being pushed over by animals. Pits expose humus-poor, mineral-rich soil and often collect moisture and fallen leaves, forming a thick organic layer that is able to nurture certain types of organisms. Mounds provide a place free of leaf inundation and saturation, where other types of organisms thrive.

=== Standing snags ===
Standing snags provide food sources and habitat for many types of organisms. In particular, many species of dead-wood predators, such as woodpeckers, must have standing snags available for feeding. In North America, the spotted owl is well known for needing standing snags for nesting habitat.

=== Decaying ground layer ===
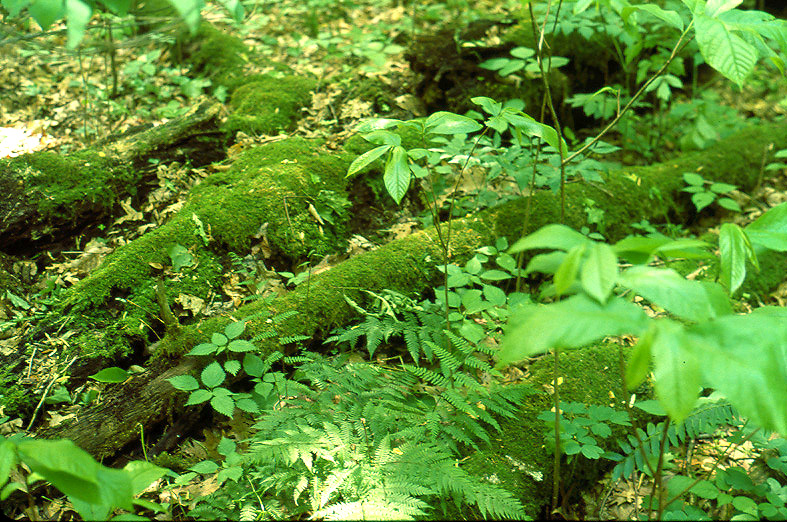
Downed wood replenishes topsoil as it decays

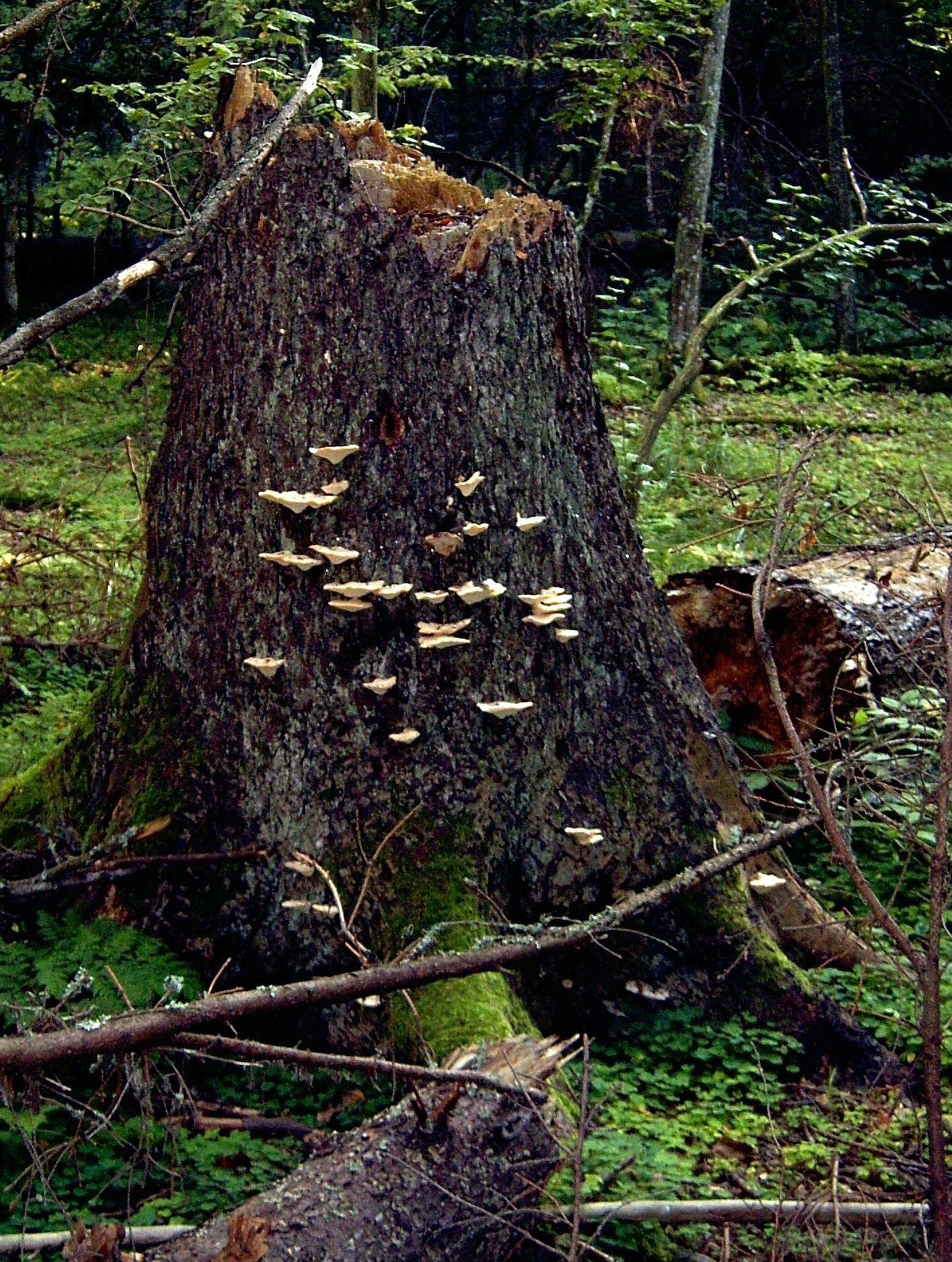
Fungus Climacocystis borealis on a tree stump in the Białowieża Forest, one of the last largely intact primeval forests in Central Europe

Fallen timber, or coarse woody debris, contributes carbon-rich organic matter directly to the soil, providing a substrate for mosses, fungi, and seedlings, and creating microhabitats by creating relief on the forest floor. In some ecosystems such as the temperate rain forest of the North American Pacific coast, fallen timber may become nurse logs, providing a substrate for seedling trees.

=== Soil ===
Intact soils harbor many life forms that rely on them. Intact soils generally have very well-defined horizons, or soil profiles. Different organisms may need certain well-defined soil horizons to live, while many trees need well-structured soils free of disturbance to thrive. Some herbaceous plants in northern hardwood forests must have thick duff layers (which are part of the soil profile). Fungal ecosystems are essential for efficient in-situ recycling of nutrients back into the entire ecosystem.

== Definitions ==
=== Ecological definitions ===
==== Stand age definition ====
Stand age can also be used to categorize a forest as old-growth. For any given geographical area, it is possible to determine the average time from disturbance until a forest reaches the old growth stage. This makes it possible to determine forest stage. The drawback of using this method to determine whether forests qualify as old-growth is that it does not account for forest characteristics, meaning that forests with old-growth attributes may be excluded due to being too young while forests without old-growth characteristics may be included solely because they are old.

Additionally, using stand age for old-growth categorization does not account for the diverse effects of human activity. For example, an old-growth forest logged at 30% needs less time to recover than an old-growth forest logged at 80%. On the other hand, a forest that recovers from a 30% harvest may consist of proportionately fewer hardwood trees than a forest logged at 80%, as more complete logging reduces competition from other tree species that could inhibit the regrowth of hardwoods.

==== Forest dynamics definition ====
From a forest dynamics perspective, old-growth forest is in a stage that follows an understory reinitiation stage. Those stages are:

1. Stand-replacing: Disturbance hits the forest and kills most of the living trees.
2. Stand-initiation: A population of new trees becomes established.
3. Stem-exclusion: Trees grow higher and enlarge their canopy, thus competing for the light with neighbors; light competition mortality kills slow-growing trees and reduces forest density, which allows surviving trees to increase in size. Eventually, the canopies of neighboring trees touch each other and drastically lower the amount of light that reaches lower layers. Due to that, the understory dies and only very shade-tolerant species survive.
4. Understory reinitiation: Trees die from low-level mortality, such as windthrow and diseases. Individual canopy gaps start to appear and more light can reach the forest floor. Hence, shade-tolerant species can establish in the understory.
5. Old-growth: Main canopy trees become older and more of them die, creating even more gaps. Since the gaps appear at different times, the understory trees are at different growth stages. Furthermore, the amount of light that reaches each understory tree depends on its position relative to the gap. Thus, each understory tree grows at a different rate. The differences in establishment timing and in growth rate create a population of understory trees that is variable in size. Eventually, some understory trees grow to become as tall as the main canopy trees, thereby filling the gap. This perpetuation process is typical for the old-growth stage. This, however, does not mean that the forest will be old-growth forever. Generally, three futures for old-growth stage forest are possible: 1) The forest will be hit by a disturbance and most of the trees will die, 2) Unfavorable conditions for new trees to regenerate will occur. In this case, the old trees will die and smaller plants will create woodland, and 3) The regenerating understory trees are different species from the main canopy trees. In this case, the forest will switch back to stem-exclusion stage, but with shade-tolerant tree species. 4) The forest in an old-growth stage can be stable for centuries, but the length of this stage depends on the forest's tree composition and the climate of the area. For example, frequent natural fires do not allow boreal forests to be as old as the coastal forests of western North America.

Of importance is that while the stand switches from one tree community to another, the stand will not necessarily go through old-growth stage between those stages. Some tree species have a relatively open canopy. That allows more shade-tolerant tree species to establish below even before the understory reinitiation stage. The shade-tolerant trees eventually outcompete the main canopy trees in stem-exclusion stage. Therefore, the dominant tree species will change, but the forest will still be in stem-exclusion stage until the shade-tolerant species reach old-growth stage.

Tree species succession may change tree species' composition once the old-growth stage has been achieved. For example, an old boreal forest may contain some large aspen trees, which may die and be replaced by smaller balsam fir or black spruce. Consequently, the forest will switch back to understory reinitiation stage. Using the stand dynamics definition, old-growth can be easily evaluated using structural attributes. However, in some forest ecosystems, this can lead to decisions regarding the preservation of unique stands or attributes that will disappear over the next few decades because of natural succession processes. Consequently, using stand dynamics to define old-growth forests is more accurate in forests where the species that constitute old-growth have long lifespans and succession is slow.

=== Social and cultural definitions ===
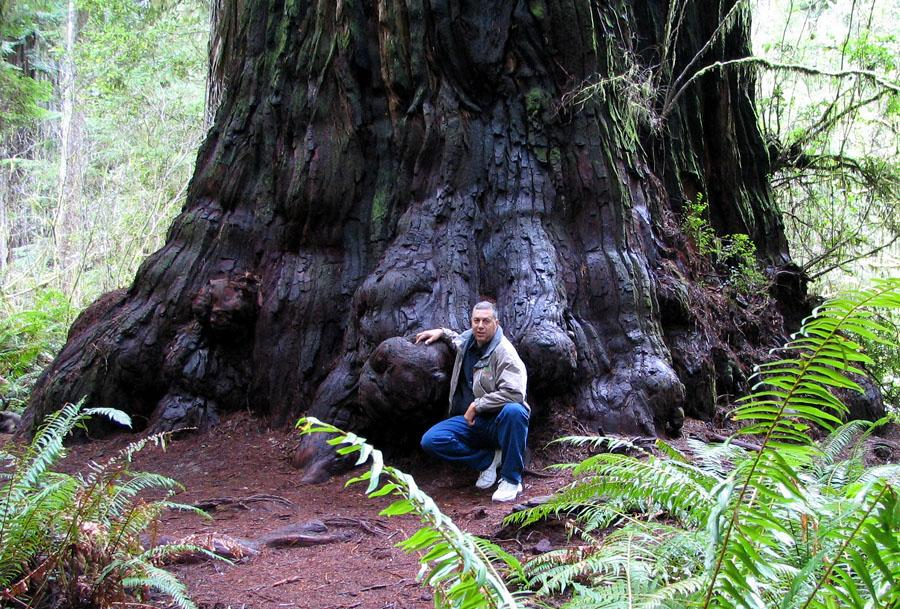
Redwood tree in northern California redwood forest: According to the National Park Service, "96 percent of the original old-growth coast redwoods have been logged."

Common cultural definitions and common denominators regarding what comprises old-growth forest, and the variables that define, constitute and embody old-growth forests include:

- The forest habitat possesses relatively mature, old trees;
- The tree species present have long continuity on the same site;
- The forest itself is a remnant natural area that has not been subjected to significant disturbance by mankind, altering the appearance of the landscape and its ecosystems, has not been subjected to logging (or other types of development such as road networks or housing), and has inherently progressed per natural tendencies.

Additionally, in mountainous, temperate landscapes (such as Western North America), and specifically in areas of high-quality soil and a moist, relatively mild climate, some old-growth trees have attained notable height and girth (DBH: diameter at breast height), accompanied by notable biodiversity in terms of the species supported. Therefore, for most people, the physical size of the trees is the most recognized hallmark of old-growth forests, even though the ecologically productive areas that support such large trees often comprise only a very small portion of the total area that has been mapped as old-growth forest. (In high-altitude, harsh climates, trees grow very slowly and thus remain at a small size. Such trees also qualify as old growth in terms of how they are mapped, but are rarely recognized by the general public as such.)

The debate over old-growth definitions has been inextricably linked with a complex range of social perceptions about wilderness preservation, biodiversity, aesthetics, and spirituality, as well as economic or industrial values.

=== Economic definitions ===
In logging terms, old-growth stands are past the economic optimum for harvesting—usually between 80 and 150 years, depending on the species. Old-growth forests were often given harvesting priority because they had the most commercially valuable timber, they were considered to be at greater risk of deterioration through root rot or insect infestation, and they occupied land that could be used for more productive second-growth stands. In some regions, old growth is not the most commercially viable timber—in British Columbia, Canada, harvesting in the coastal region is moving to younger second-growth stands.

=== Other definitions ===
A 2001 scientific symposium in Canada found that defining old growth in a scientifically meaningful, yet policy-relevant, manner presents some basic difficulties, especially if a simple, unambiguous, and rigorous scientific definition is sought. Symposium participants identified some attributes of late-successional, temperate-zone, old-growth forest types that could be considered in developing an index of "old-growthness" and for defining old-growth forests:

Structural features:

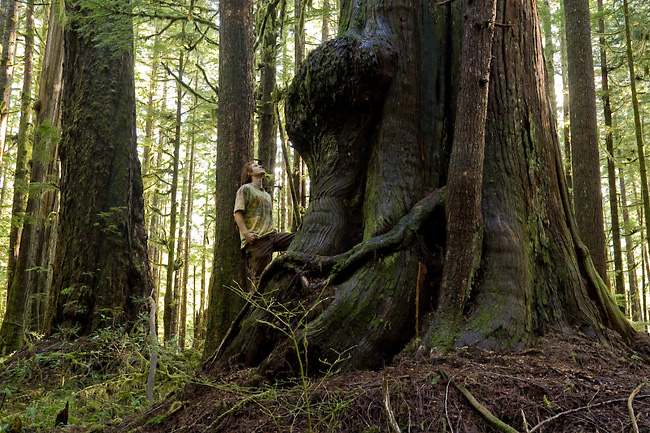
Avatar Grove near Port Renfrew, British Columbia: Giant Douglas firs (left) and red cedars (right) fill the grove.

- Uneven or multi-aged stand structure, or several identifiable age cohorts
- Average age of dominant species approaching half the maximum longevity for species (about 150+ years for most shade-tolerant trees)
- Some old trees at close to their maximum longevity (ages of 300+ years)
- Presence of standing dead and dying trees in various stages of decay
- Fallen, coarse woody debris
- Natural regeneration of dominant tree species within canopy gaps or on decaying logs

Compositional features:

- Long-lived, shade-tolerant tree species associations (e.g., sugar maple, American beech, yellow birch, red spruce, eastern hemlock, white pine)

Process features:

- Characterized by small-scale disturbances creating gaps in the forest canopy
- A long natural rotation for catastrophic or stand-replacing disturbance (e.g., a period greater than the maximum longevity of the dominant tree species)
- Minimal evidence of human disturbance
- Final stages of stand development before a relatively steady state is reached

== Importance ==
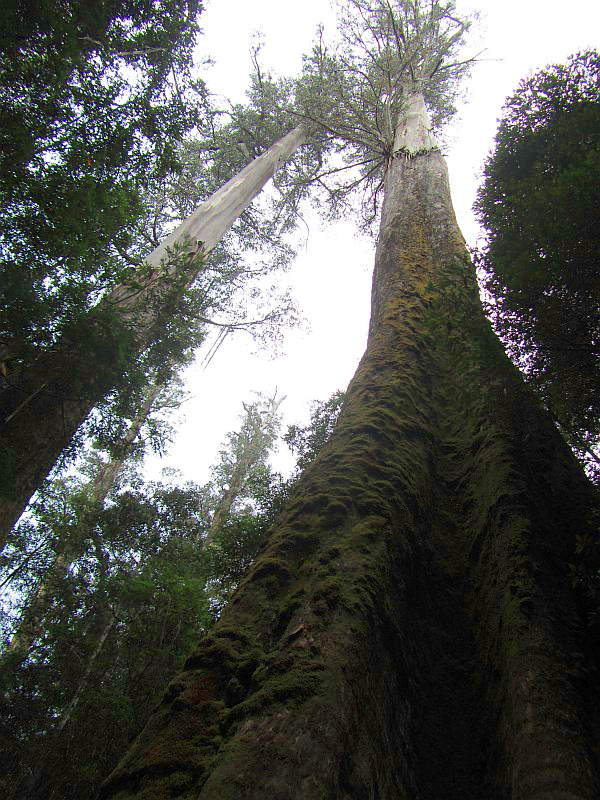
Eucalyptus regnans forest in Tasmania, Australia

- Old-growth forests often contain rich communities of plants and animals within the habitat due to the long period of forest stability. These varied and sometimes rare species may depend on the unique environmental conditions created by these forests.
- Old-growth forests serve as a reservoir for species, which cannot thrive or easily regenerate in younger forests, so they can be used as a baseline for research.
- Plant species that are native to old-growth forests may someday prove to be invaluable towards curing various human ailments, as has been realized in numerous plants in tropical rainforests.
- Old-growth forests also store large amounts of carbon above and below the ground (either as humus, or in wet soils as peat). They collectively represent a very significant store of carbon. Destruction of these forests releases this carbon as greenhouse gases, and may increase the risk of global climate change. Although old-growth forests serve as a global carbon dioxide sink, they are not protected by international treaties, because it is generally thought that aging forests cease to accumulate carbon. However, in forests between 15 and 800 years of age, net ecosystem productivity (the net carbon balance of the forest including soils) is usually positive; old-growth forests accumulate carbon for centuries and contain large quantities of it.

== Ecosystem services ==
Old-growth forests provide ecosystem services that may be far more important to society than their use as a source of raw materials. These services include making breathable air, making pure water, carbon storage, regeneration of nutrients, maintenance of soils, pest control by insectivorous bats and insects, micro- and macro-climate control, and the storage of a wide variety of genes.

== Climatic impacts ==
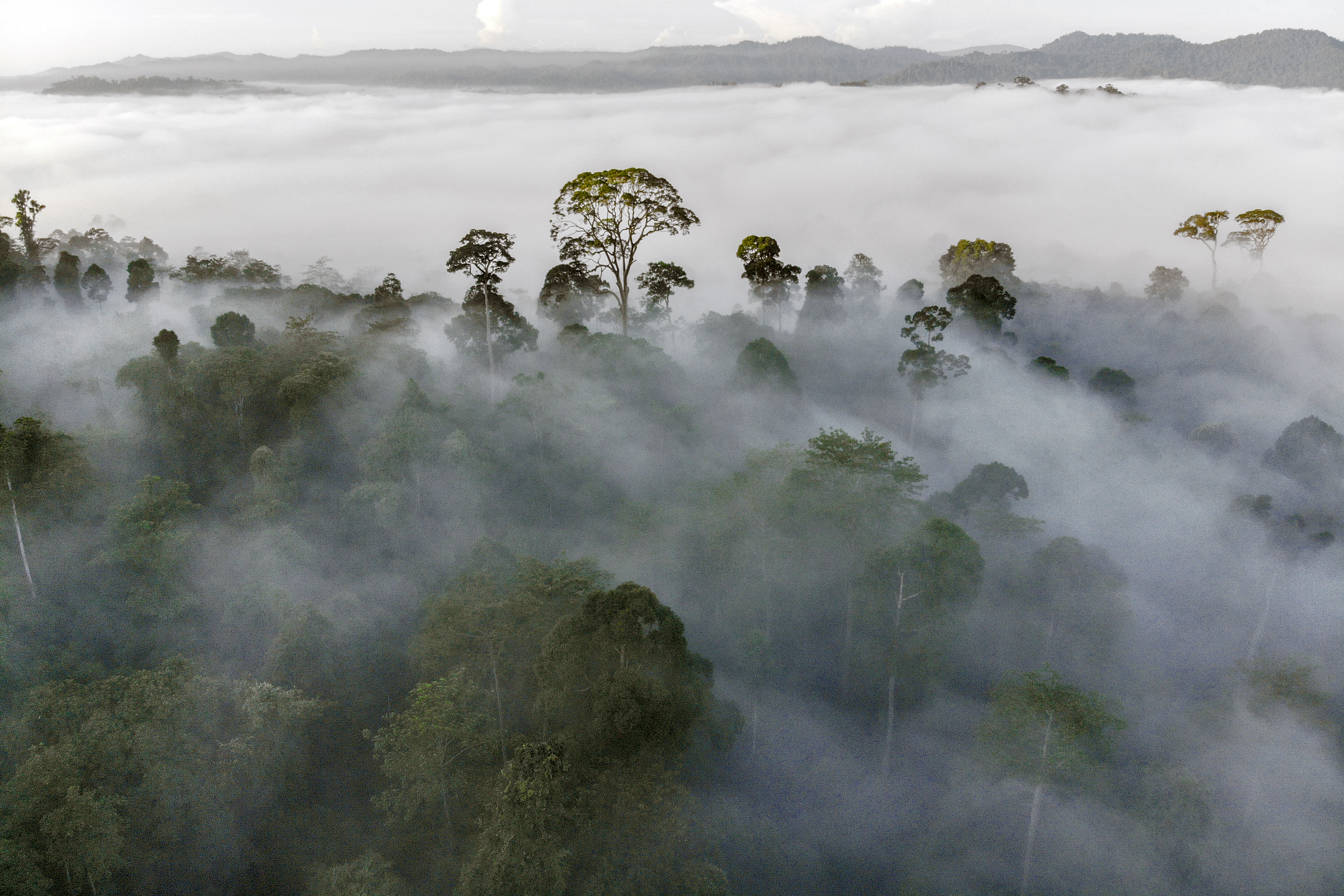
Mist condensing over rainforest in Danum Valley Conservation Area, Malaysia

The effects of old-growth forests in relation to global warming have been addressed in various studies and journals.

The Intergovernmental Panel on Climate Change said in its 2007 report: "In the long term, a sustainable forest management strategy aimed at maintaining or increasing forest carbon stocks, while producing an annual sustained yield of timber, fibre, or energy from the forest, will generate the largest sustained mitigation benefit."

Old-growth forests are often perceived to be in equilibrium or in a state of decay. However, evidence from analysis of carbon stored above ground and in the soil has shown old-growth forests are more productive at storing carbon than younger forests. Forest harvesting has little or no effect on the amount of carbon stored in the soil, but other research suggests older forests that have trees of many ages, multiple layers, and little disturbance have the highest capacities for carbon storage. As trees grow, they remove carbon from the atmosphere, and protecting these pools of carbon prevents emissions into the atmosphere. Proponents of harvesting the forest argue the carbon stored in wood is available for use as biomass energy (displacing fossil fuel use), although using biomass as a fuel produces air pollution in the form of carbon monoxide, nitrogen oxides, volatile organic compounds, particulates, and other pollutants, in some cases at levels above those from traditional fuel sources such as coal or natural gas.

Each forest has a different potential to store carbon. For example, this potential is particularly high in the Pacific Northwest where forests are relatively productive, trees live a long time, decomposition is relatively slow, and fires are infrequent. The differences between forests must, therefore, be taken into consideration when determining how they should be managed to store carbon. A 2019 study projected that old-growth forests in Southeast Asia, the majority of which are in Indonesia and Malaysia, are able to sequester carbon or be a net emitter of greenhouse gases based on deforestation scenarios over the subsequent decades.

Old-growth forests have the potential to impact climate change, but climate change is also impacting old-growth forests. As the effects of global warming grow more substantial, the ability of old-growth forests to sequester carbon is affected. Climate change showed an impact on the mortality of some dominant tree species, as observed in the Korean pine. Climate change also showed an effect on the composition of species when forests were surveyed over a 10- and 20-year period, which may disrupt the overall productivity of the forest.

== Logging ==
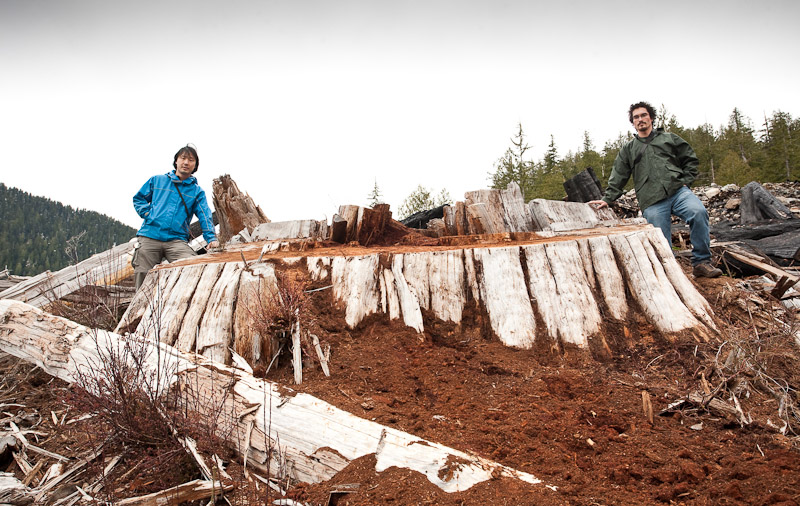
Old-growth red cedar stump near Port Renfrew, British Columbia

According to the World Resources Institute, as of January 2009, only 21% of the original old-growth forests that once existed on Earth are remaining. An estimated one-half of Western Europe's forests were cleared before the Middle Ages, and 90% of the old-growth forests that existed in the contiguous United States in the 1600s have been cleared.

The large trees in old-growth forests are economically valuable and have been subject to aggressive logging throughout the world. This has led to many conflicts between logging companies and environmental groups. From certain forestry perspectives, fully maintaining an old-growth forest is seen as extremely economically unproductive, as timber can only be collected from falling trees, and also potentially damaging to nearby managed groves by creating environments conducive to root rot. It may be more productive to cut the old growth down and replace the forest with a younger one.

The island of Tasmania, just off the southeast coast of Australia, has the largest amount of temperate old-growth rainforest reserves in Australia, with around 12,390 km^{2} (4,780 sq mi) in total. While the local Regional Forest Agreement (RFA) was originally designed to protect much of this natural wealth, many of the RFA old-growth forests protected in Tasmania consist of trees of little use to the timber industry. RFA old-growth and high conservation value forests that contain species highly desirable to the forestry industry have been poorly preserved. Only 22% of Tasmania's original tall-eucalypt forests managed by Forestry Tasmania have been reserved. Ten thousand hectares of tall-eucalypt RFA old-growth forest have been lost since 1996, predominantly as a result of industrial logging operations. In 2006, about 610 km^{2} (240 sq mi) of tall-eucalypt RFA old-growth forests remained unprotected. Recent logging attempts in the Upper Florentine Valley have sparked a series of protests and media attention over the arrests that have taken place in this area. Additionally, Gunns Limited, the primary forestry contractor in Tasmania, has been under recent criticism by political and environmental groups over its practice of woodchipping timber harvested from old-growth forests.

== Management ==
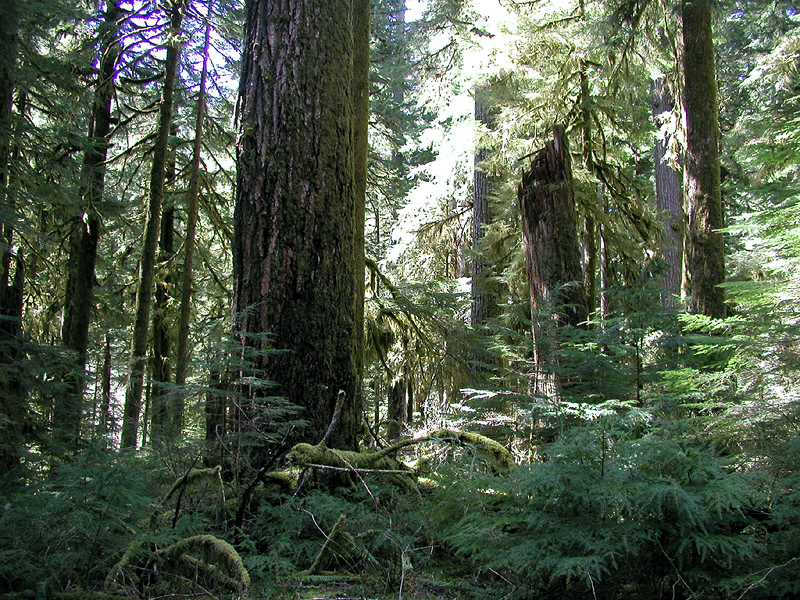
Old-growth forest in the Opal Creek Wilderness, a wilderness area located in the Willamette National Forest in the U.S. state of Oregon, on the border of Mount Hood National Forest. It has the largest uncut watershed in Oregon.

Increased understanding of forest dynamics in the late 20th century led the scientific community to identify a need to inventory, understand, manage, and conserve representative examples of old-growth forests with their associated characteristics and values. Literature around old growth and its management is inconclusive about the best way to characterize the true essence of an old-growth stand.

A better understanding of natural systems has resulted in new ideas about forest management, such as managed natural disturbances, which should be designed to achieve the landscape patterns and habitat conditions normally maintained in nature. This coarse filter approach to biodiversity conservation recognizes ecological processes and provides for a dynamic distribution of old growth across the landscape. And all seral stages—young, medium, and old—support forest biodiversity. Plants and animals rely on different forest ecosystem stages to meet their habitat needs.

In Australia, the RFA attempted to prevent the clearfelling of defined "old-growth forests". This led to struggles over what constitutes "old growth". For example, in Western Australia, the timber industry tried to limit the area of old growth in the karri forests of the Southern Forests Region; this led to the creation of the Western Australian Forests Alliance, the splitting of the Liberal Government of Western Australia and the election of the Gallop Labor Government. Old-growth forests in this region have now been placed inside national parks. A small proportion of old-growth forests also exist in South-West Australia and are protected by federal laws from logging, which has not occurred there for more than 20 years.

In British Columbia, Canada, old-growth forests must be maintained in each of the province's ecological units to meet biodiversity needs.

In the United States, from 2001, around a quarter of the federal forests are protected from logging. In December 2023, Biden's administration introduced a rule, according to which, logging is strongly limited in old growth forests, but permitted in "mature forests", representing a compromise between the logging industry and environmental activists.

== Locations of remaining tracts ==
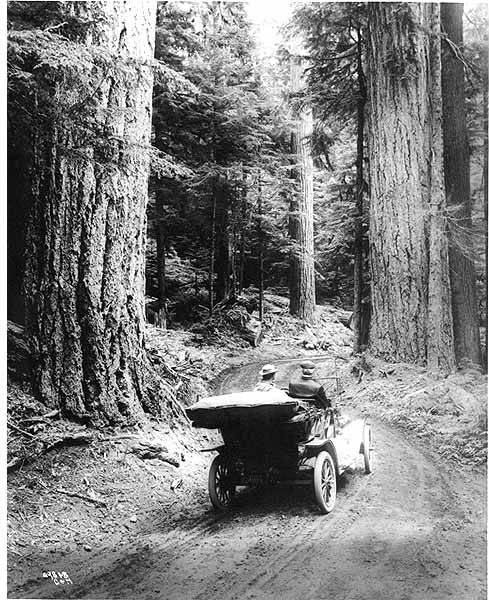
First-growth or virgin forest near Mount Rainier, 1914

Primary forests, which include old growth forests, cover at least 1.18 billion ha (29%) of the total forest area). Of the regions, Europe has the largest area of primary forest, at 311 million ha, followed by South America (299 million ha) and North and Central America (280 million ha). The area of primary forest worldwide decreased by 110 million ha between 1990 and 2025. Primary forests were lost at a rate of 1.61 million ha per year between 2015 and 2025, which was less than half the rate in 2000–2015, when it was 3.92 million ha per year.

In 2006, Greenpeace identified that the world's remaining intact forest landscapes are distributed among the continents as follows:

- 35% in South America: The Amazon rainforest is mainly located in Brazil, which clears a larger area of forest annually than any other country in the world.
- 28% in North America, which harvests 10,000 km^{2} (3,900 mi^{2}) of ancient forests every year. Many of the fragmented forests of southern Canada and the United States lack adequate animal travel corridors and functioning ecosystems for large mammals. Most of the remaining old-growth forests in the contiguous United States and Alaska are on public land.
- 19% in northern Asia, home to the largest boreal forest in the world.
- 8% in Africa, which has lost most of its intact forest landscapes in the last 30 years. The timber industry and local governments are responsible for destroying huge areas of intact forest landscapes and continue to be the single largest threat to these areas.
- 7% in the South Asia–Pacific, where the Paradise Forests are being destroyed faster than any other forest on Earth. Much of the large, intact forest landscapes have already been cut down, 72% in Indonesia, and 60% in Papua New Guinea.
- Less than 3% in Europe, where more than 150 km^{2} (58 mi^{2}) of intact forest landscapes are cleared every year and the last areas of the region's intact forest landscapes in European Russia are shrinking rapidly. In the United Kingdom, they are known as ancient woodlands.

== See also ==
- Clearcutting – Forestry/logging practice in which most or all trees in an area are uniformly cut down
- Cloud forest – Type of rainforest
- Conservation-reliant species – Type of species requiring human intervention
- Forest ecology – Study of interactions between the biota and environment in forests
- Forest migration
- Habitat conservation – Management practice for protecting types of environments
- History of the forest in Central Europe
- Illegal logging – Harvest, transportation, purchase, or sale of timber in violation of laws
- Kelp forest – Underwater areas highly dense with kelp
- List of countries by forest area
- List of superlative trees
- Old-Growth Forest Network – American non-profit organization
- REDD-plus – Climate change mitigation policy
- Sacred groves – Grove of trees of special religious importance to a particular culture
- Secondary forest – Forest or woodland area which has re-grown after a timber harvest
- Sky island – Geographic or environmental feature
- Subalpine – Ecosystems found in mountains forest
- Taiga – Biome characterized by coniferous forests
- Temperate broadleaf and mixed forest – Biome
- Temperate coniferous forest – Forests found in areas with warm summers and cool winters
- Tropical and subtropical coniferous forests – Tropical forest habitat type
- Tropical and subtropical moist broadleaf forests – Habitat type defined by the World Wide Fund for Nature
- Woodland management – Branch of forestry

== Sources ==
This article incorporates text from a free content work. Licensed under CC BY 4.0 (license statement/permission). Text taken from Global Forest Resources Assessment 2025, Food and Agriculture Organization of the United Nations (FAO).

== Sources ==
This article incorporates text from a free content work. Licensed under CC BY-SA 3.0 (license statement/permission). Text taken from Global Forest Resources Assessment 2020 Key findings, FAO, FAO. This article incorporates text from a free content work. Licensed under CC BY-SA 3.0 (license statement/permission). Text taken from The State of the World's Forests 2020. In brief – Forests, biodiversity and people, FAO & UNEP, FAO & UNEP.
