= Tree throw =

Soil depression created by a tree

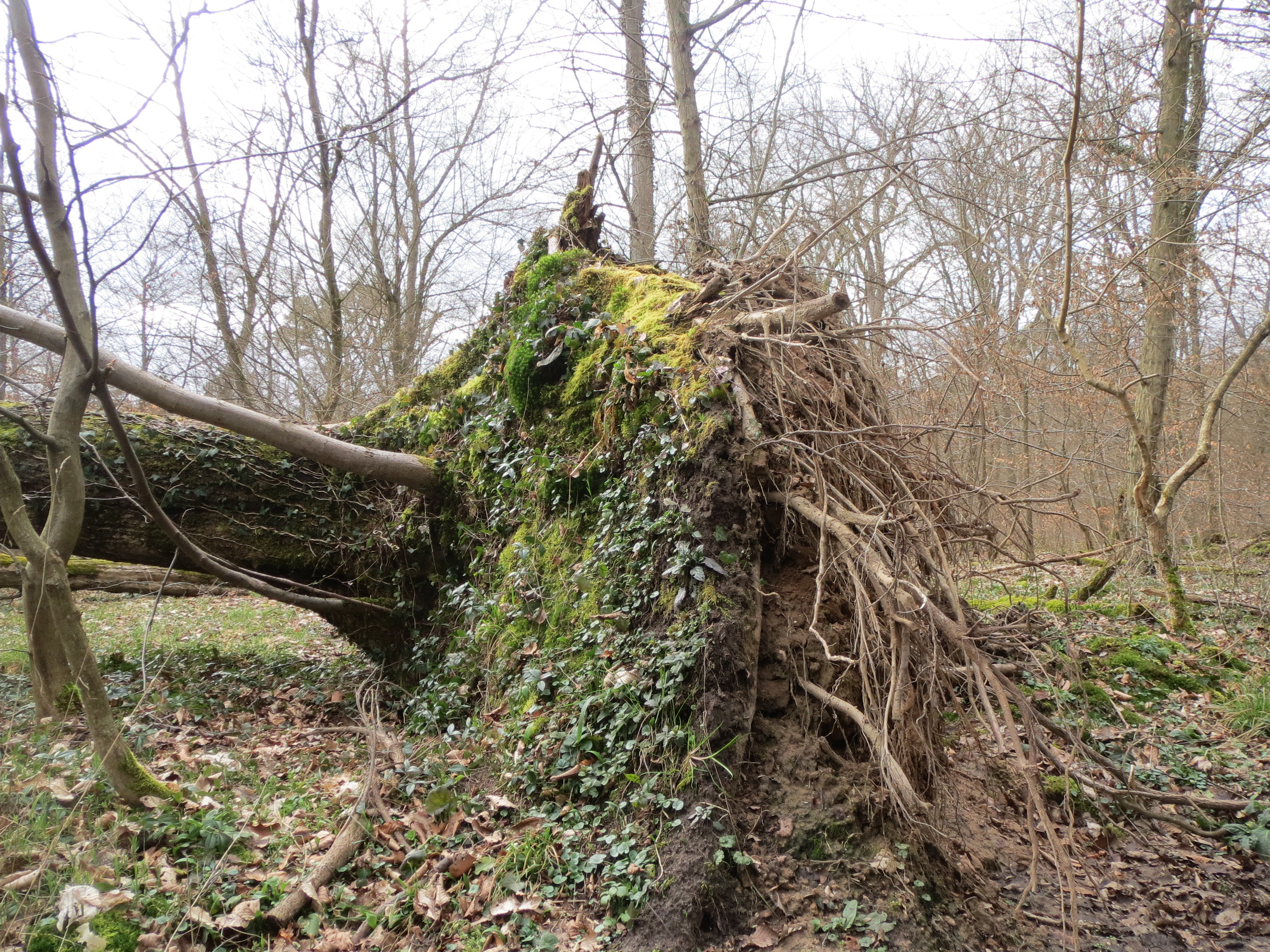
Soil pulled from the ground by the root ball of a linden tree that was blown over in a storm.

A tree throw or tree hole is a bowl-shaped cavity or depression created in the subsoil by a tree.

They are formed either by the long-term presence and growth of tree roots or when a large tree is blown over (as a windthrow) or has its stump pulled out which tears out a quantity of soil along with the roots. The resultant hole will often slowly fill with organic material and can be identified during archaeological fieldwork.

The pit left in the ground after a rootwad is removed can be several meters across and 1–2 metres (3.3–6.6 ft) deep.

Fresh tree throws also provide a degree of shelter amongst the roots for animals. Some also contain evidence of prehistoric human activity such as flint tools suggesting that they were sometimes used by people in the distant past.

Tree throws expose humus-poor, mineral-rich soil. Over time the hole will fill with rain water, fallen leaves, animal excrement and other organic matter which over time becomes a habitat for decomposers which soon form a community on the thick organic layer and so are able to nurture certain types of organisms.

Tree throws contribute to bedrock weathering and soil formation, and why it is fastest in soils of intermediate thickness. In thin soils, fresh bedrock fragments are a large proportion of the upturned rootwad, but trees are sparse; in deeper soils less rock is upturned, but trees are more common, and in soils deeper than the depth of roots, no bedrock is upturned. The advent of trees roughly 370 million years ago led to dramatic ecosystem changes, as before then bedrock weathering was too slow to maintain thick soils in hilly terrain.

Pits from tree throws, together with mounds from decaying fallen trees, are part of the characteristic pit-and-mound topography of old-growth forest.

== See also ==
- Nest box
- Reverse stratigraphy
- Snag
- Stonehenge
- Tree hollow
