= Tree uprooting =

Pulling a tree out of the ground with roots attached

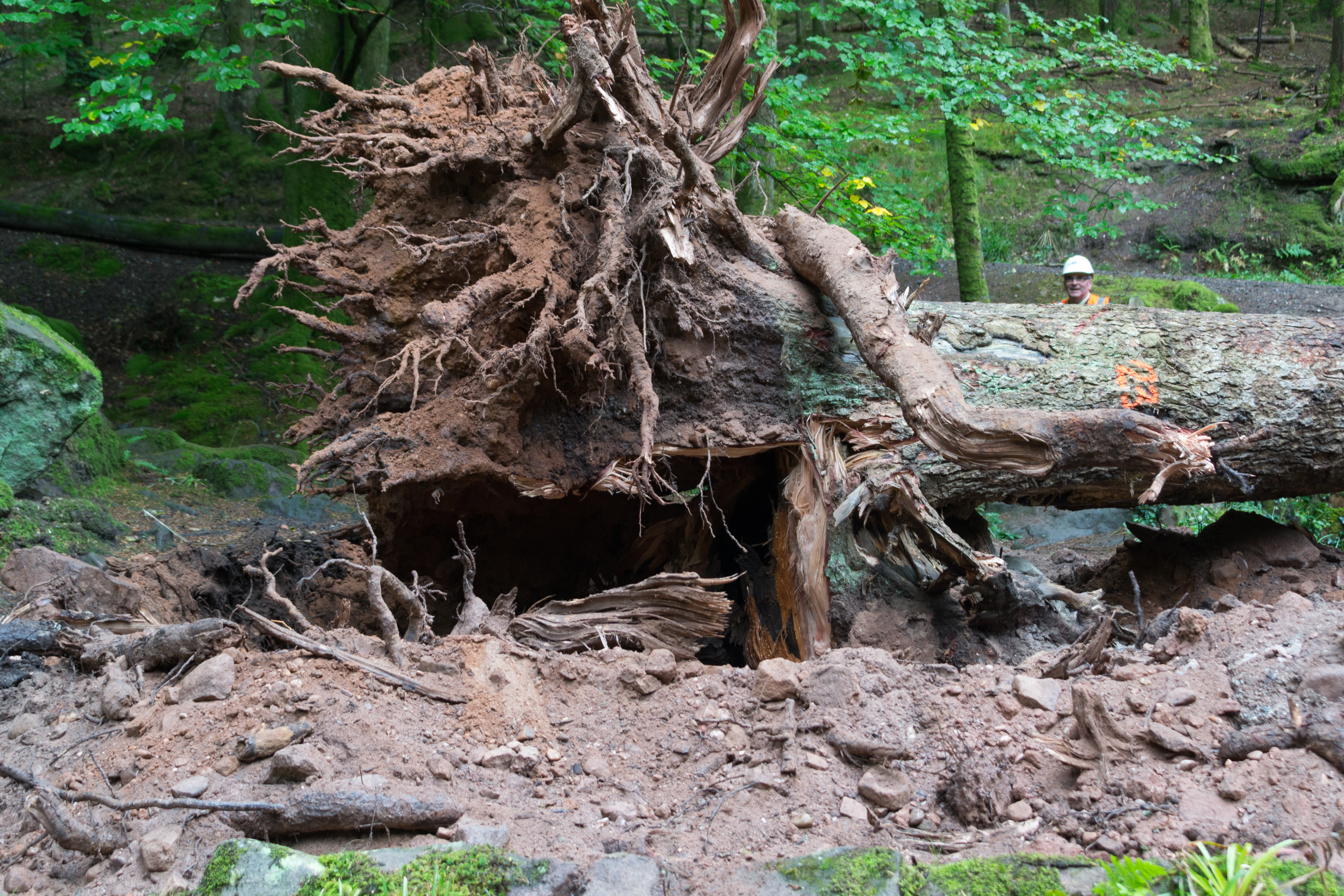
A fallen tree with exposed root plate

Uprooting is a form of treefall in which the root plate of a tree is torn from the soil, disrupting and mixing it and leaving a pit-mound.

== Purposes ==
=== Transplanting ===
Small trees can be replanted if their root system is well attached to the trunk. Trees can suffer from transplant shock when moved to a new environment, and that causes the tree not to be able to root itself properly.

=== Ecosystem maintenance ===
Uprooting can be an effective method for efforts to remove unwanted woody species from an ecosystem, e.g., in the context of woody plant encroachment.
