= Stratton, Biggleswade =

Former settlement in Biggleswade

Stratton was one of the three settlements in the parish of Biggleswade in Bedfordshire, England during the medieval period, but it has since been abandoned.

== Anglo-Saxon and Norman ==
Archbishop Stigand held the manor when the Norman Conquest came; it was made up of four manors having a coverage of 900 acres (360 ha).

Stratton was mentioned in the Domesday Book and had a recorded population of 27 households and is listed under four owners:

- Walter Giffard
- Walter of Flanders
- Ralph de L'isle
- Countess Judith

=== Archaeology ===
Stratton Moat is a scheduled ancient monument formed of a moat ditch circuit, counterscarp bank, central platform and walled garden compound located on the south-east edge of Biggleswade in Bedfordshire, England. The site marks the ancient manor of Stratton.

A report on the site by English Heritage concluded that it was probable that the site played an integrated role in a network of settlements: "Although the moated enclosure at Stratton now survives as an isolated structure within the modern landscape of farming, housing and residential development, this is a misleading picture." In particular the site appears not to have been built for defensive purposes, but as a manorial residence, chosen for commanding location: its slight elevation makes it highly visible and overshadows its immediate environment. The evidence found at the site indicates that a manor did once stand there, along with various auxiliary buildings, like barns. In recent years, the site has been damaged by a static mobile home park, with residents of the park making cuttings into the counterscarp bank to provide themselves with parking spaces or small areas of garden.

A date for the construction of Stratton Park Moated Enclosure has not been set (the oldest artefactual material found is a piece of 11th–14th century pottery); English Heritage states that the pinnacle of construction for similar sites occurred around 1250 to 1400.

=== Stratton Park House ===
Stratton Park House was built in the 16th century and was altered by enlarging it in the 17th century, with more modifications in the 19th century. Stratton Park Drive was the drive to the house, followed by its present line in 1838, and the park was underlain by grass. Most of it was ploughed around 1910, destroying surface earthworks; the Stratton Park moat and the earthworks to the northeast have remained. Stratton Park House was demolished in 1960, after its usage as an army barracks in World War II and a chicken house.

== Geography and geology ==
The village lies 300 m (980 ft) east of the Roman road, by a ridge of glacial gravels, surrounded by boulder clay.
