= Windthrow =

Trees uprooted by wind

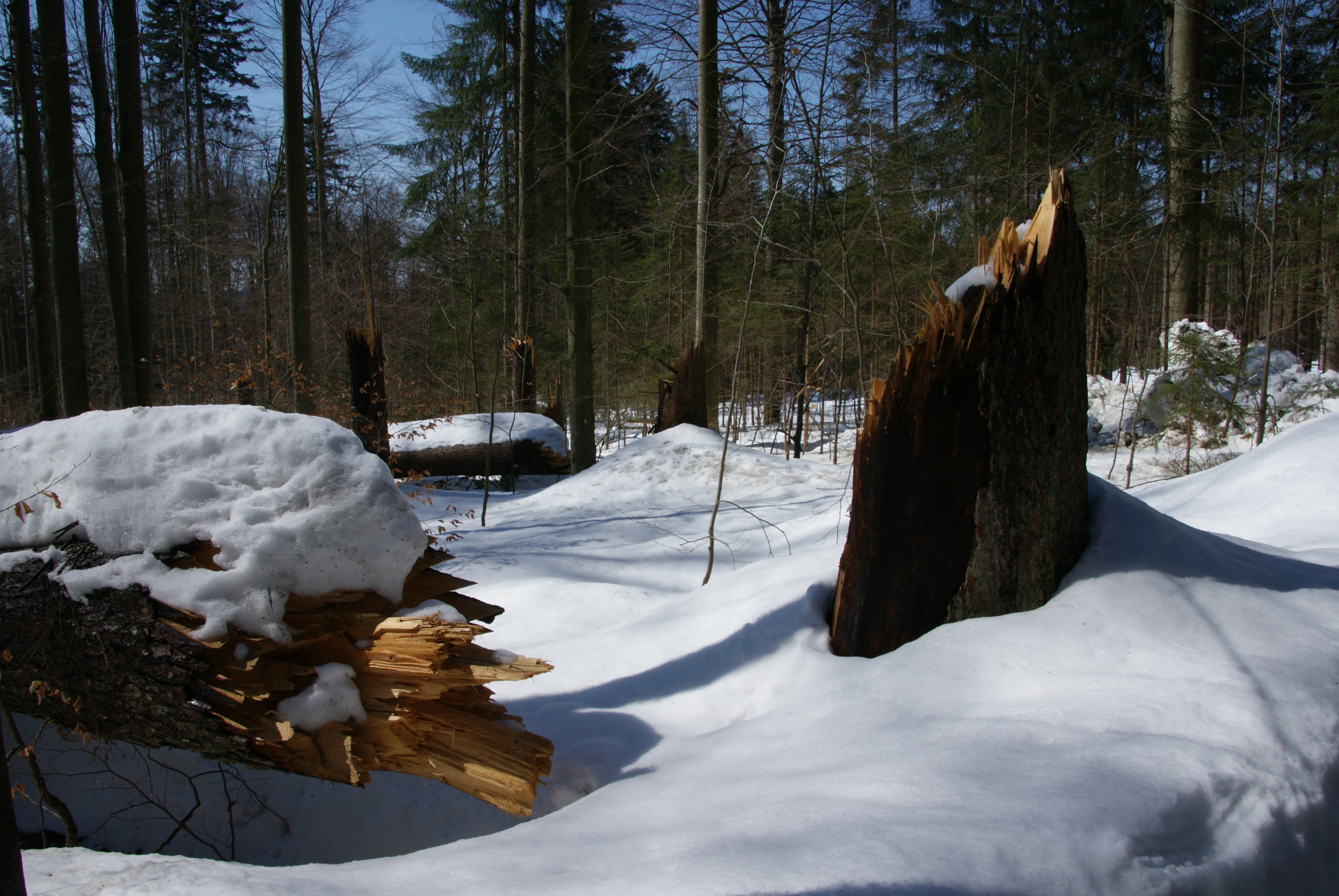
Windsnap in the Bavarian Forest National Park

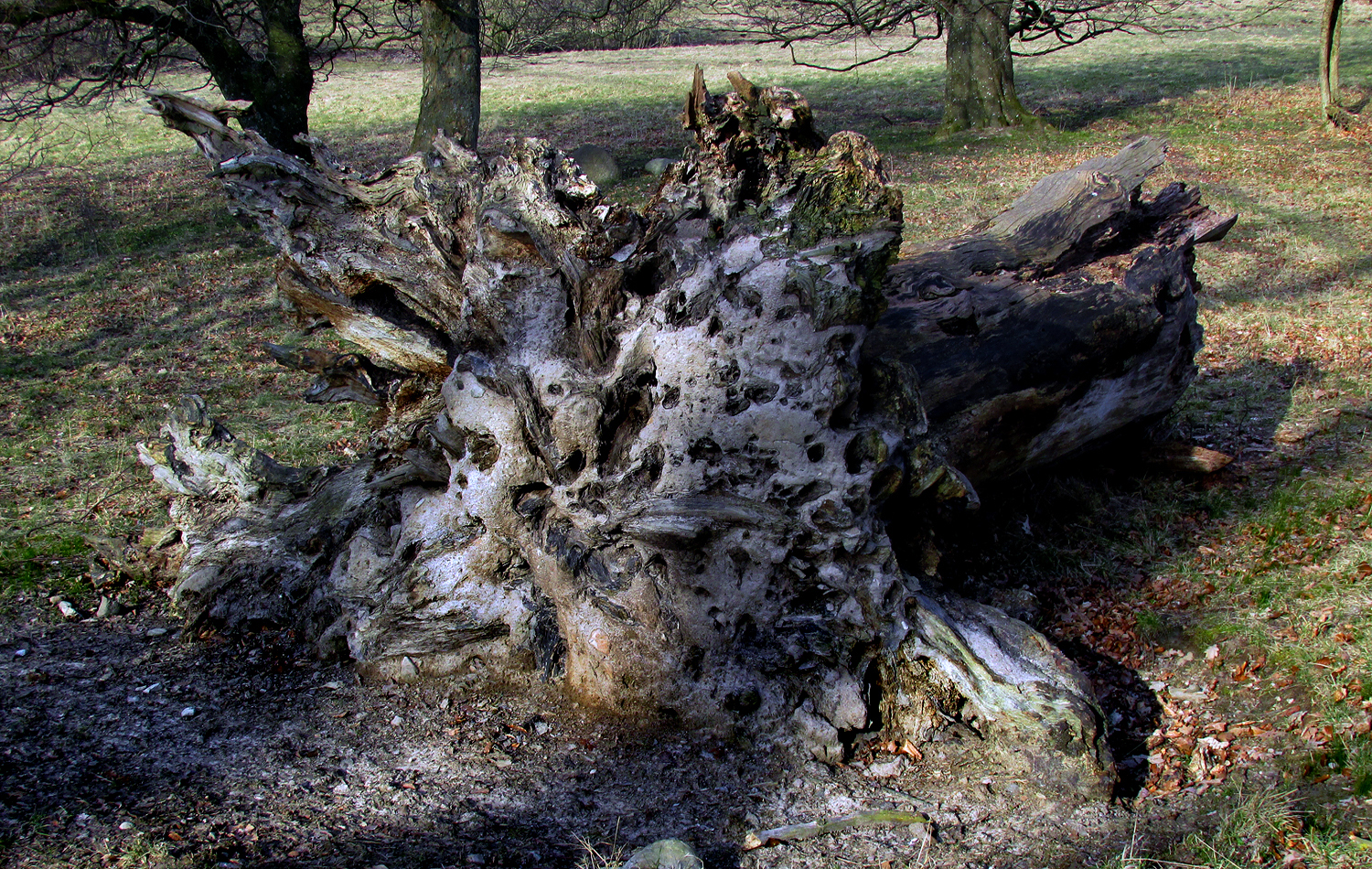
An old dried out windthrow. Ystad.

A large-scale event in the Sangre de Cristo Mountains

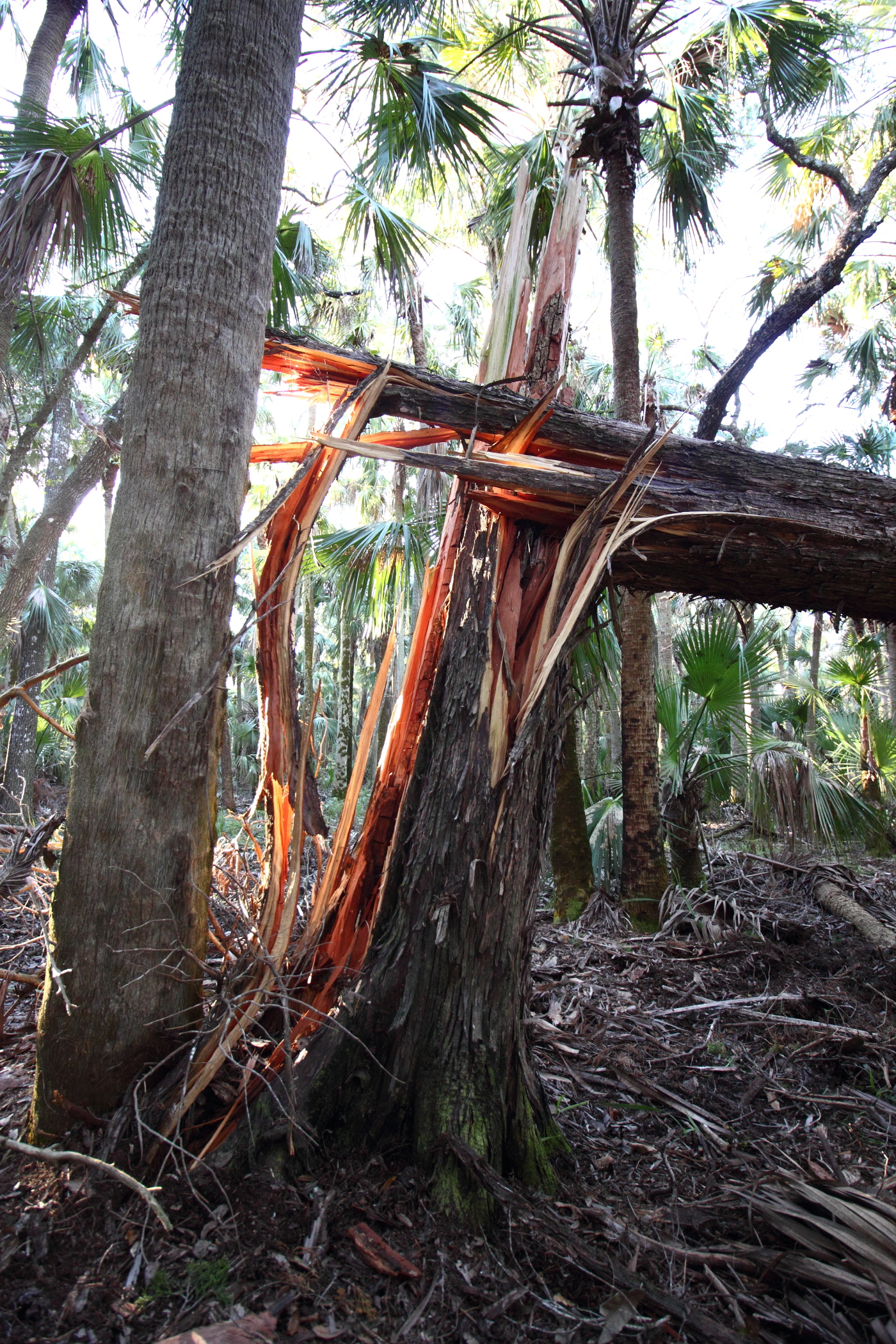
Juniperus virginiana var. silicicola windsnapped by Hurricane Irma

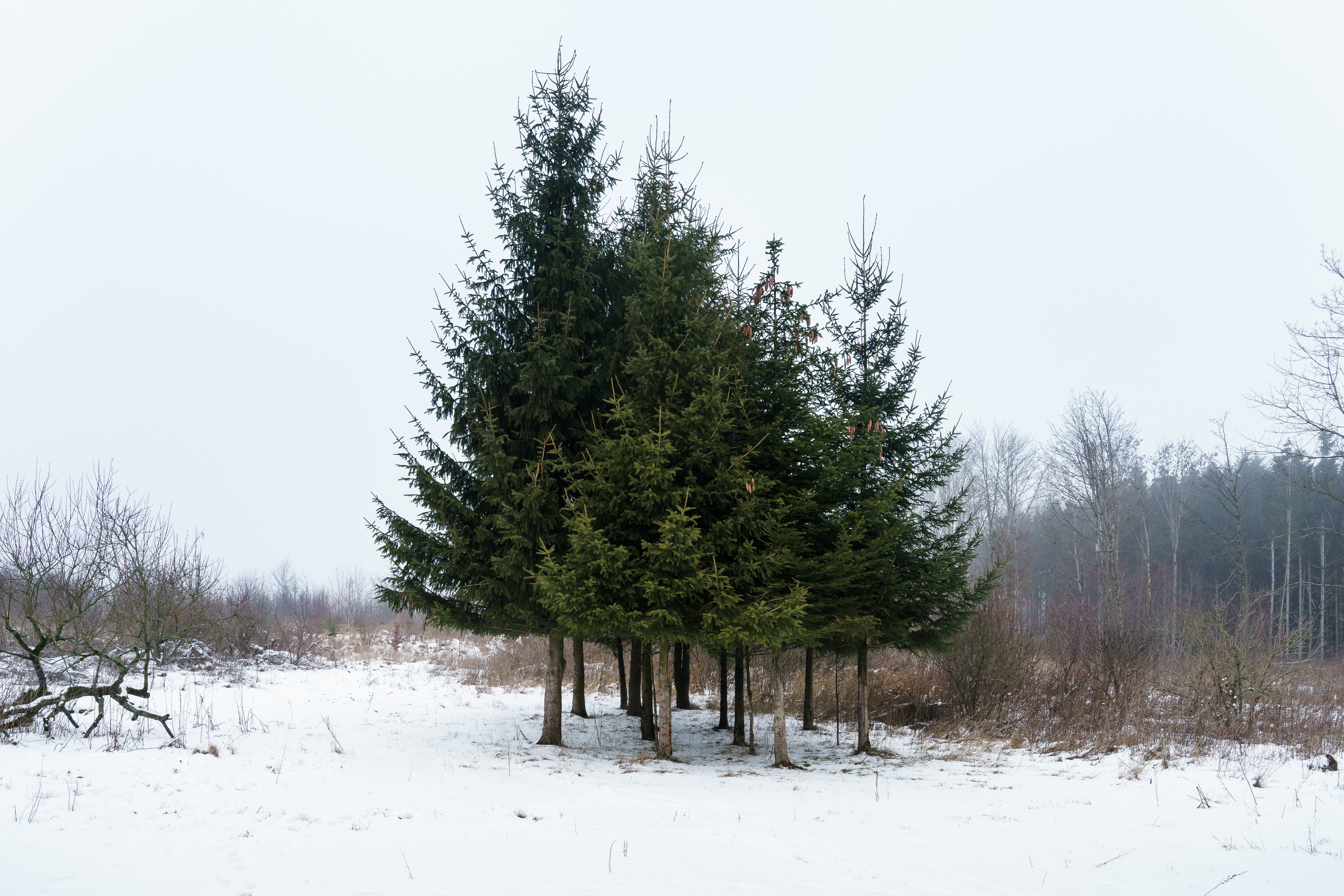
Young spruce group marginal windthrow area twelve years after Kyrill

Video of windthrow in Tammneeme, Estonia

In forestry, windthrow refers to trees uprooted by wind. Breakage of the tree bole (trunk) instead of uprooting is called windsnap. Blowdown refers to both windthrow and windsnap.

== Causes ==
Windthrow is common in all forested parts of the world that experience storms or high wind speeds. The risk of windthrow to a tree is related to the tree's size (height and diameter), the 'sail area' presented by its crown, the anchorage provided by its roots, its exposure to the wind, and the local wind climate. A common way of quantifying the risk of windthrow to a forest area is to model the probability or 'return time' of a wind speed that would damage those trees at that location. Another potential method is the detection of scattered windthrow based on satellite images. Tree senescence can also be a factor, where multiple factors contributing to the declining health of a tree reduce its anchorage and therefore increase its susceptibility to windthrow. The resulting damage can be a significant factor in the development of a forest.

Windthrow can also increase following logging, especially in young forests managed specifically for timber. The removal of trees at a forest's edge increases the exposure of the remaining trees to the wind.

Trees that grow adjacent to lakes or other natural forest edges, or in exposed situations such as hill sides, develop greater rooting strength through growth feedback with wind movement, i.e. 'adaptive' or 'acclimative' growth. If a tree does not experience much wind movement during the stem exclusion phase of stand succession, it is not likely to develop a resistance to wind. Thus, when a fully or partially developed stand is bisected by a new road or by a clearcut, the trees on the new edge are less supported by neighbouring trees than they were and may not be capable of withstanding the higher forces which they now experience.

Trees with heavy growths of ivy, wisteria, or kudzu are already stressed and may be more susceptible to windthrow, as the additional foliage increases the tree's sail area.

Trees with decayed trunk, fungus-induced cankers, and borer damages are more susceptible to windsnap.

Young trees (less than 100 years old) can snap when pushed by wind gusts, while older trees usually do not snap but are uprooted.

== Ecological effects ==
Windthrow disturbance generates a variety of unique ecological resources on which certain forest processes are highly dependent. Windthrow can be considered a cataclysmic abiotic factor that can generate an entire new chain of seral plant succession in a given area. Windthrow can also be considered to act as a rejuvenating process whereby regeneration is made possible with new resource availability.

Severe uprooting opens bare patches of mineral soil that can act as seed sinks. These patches have been shown, in the Pacific Northwest of the United States, to have higher biodiversity than the surrounding forest floor. Additionally, the gap created in the forest canopy when windthrow occurs yields an increase in light, moisture, and nutrient availability in near proximity to the disturbance.

Toppled trees have the potential to become nurse logs, nurturing habitats for other forest organisms.

Tree throws contribute to bedrock weathering and soil formation. In thin soils, fresh bedrock fragments are a large proportion of the upturned rootwad, but trees are sparse, so rates of weathering are low; in intermediate-depth soils less rock is upturned, but trees are more common, so weathering reaches a maximum; in soils deeper than the depth of roots, no bedrock is upturned, and weathering is slow. The advent of trees roughly 370 million years ago led to dramatic ecosystem changes, as before then bedrock weathering was too slow to maintain thick soils in hilly terrain.

== See also ==
- Derecho
- Krummholz: crooked, stunted trees
- Microburst: sinking air
- Pit-and-mound topography: terrain caused by windthrown trees
- Reaction wood

== Bibliography ==
- Nina G Ulanova, Forest Ecology and Management; Volume 135, Issues 1–3, 15 September 2000, Pages 155–167; The effects of windthrow on forests at different spatial scales: a review
- Canham, C.D. & Loucks, O.L. (1984) Catastrophic windthrow in the presettlement forests of Wisconsin. Ecology, 65, 803–809.
- Canham, C.D., Denslow, J.S., Platt, W.J., Runkle, J.R., Spies, T.A. & White, P.S. (1990) Light regimes beneath closed canopies and tree-fall gaps in temperate and tropical forests. Canadian Journal of Forest Research, 20, 620–631.
- Canham, C.D., Papaik, M.J. & Latty, E.J. (2001) Interspecific variation in susceptibility to windthrow as a function of tree size and storm severity for northern hardwood tree species. Canadian Journal of Forest Research, 31, 1–10.
- Mladenoff, D.J. (1987) Dynamics of nitrogen mineralization and nitrification in hemlock and hardwood treefall gaps. Ecology, 68, 1171–1180.
- Peterson, C.J. & Pickett, S.T.A. (1995) Forest reorganization – A case study in an old-growth forest catastrophic blowdown. Ecology, 76, 763–774.
- Pickett, S.T.A. & White (1985) Patch dynamics: a synthesis. The Ecology of Natural Disturbance and Patch Dynamics (eds S.T.A.Pickett & P.S.White), pp. 371–384. Academic Press, Orlando, FL.
- Metcalfe, D. J., Bradford, M. G., & Ford, A. J. (2008). Cyclone damage to tropical rain forests: Species‐and community‐level impacts. Austral Ecology, 33(4), 432-441.
