= Tree hollow =

Cavity in tree, often used as habitat

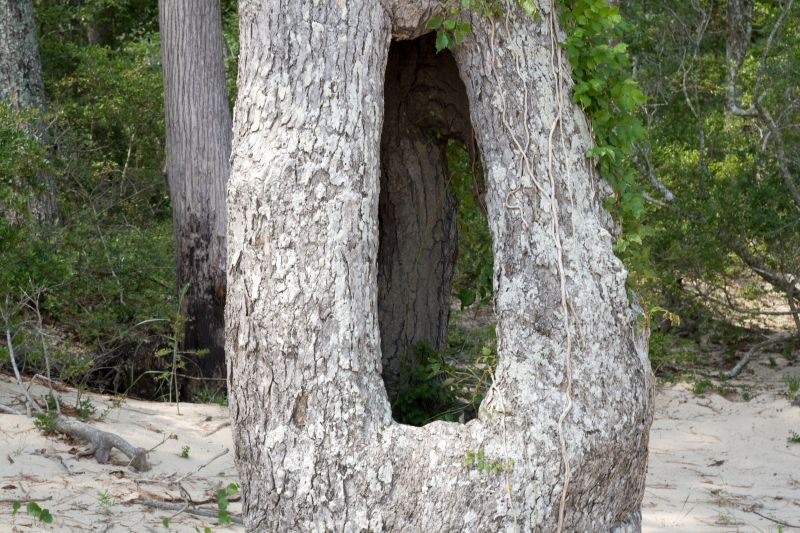
A naturally formed tree hollow at the base of the tree.

Water-filled tree hollow (dendrotelma) in a twinned sycamore, Dorset, U.K.

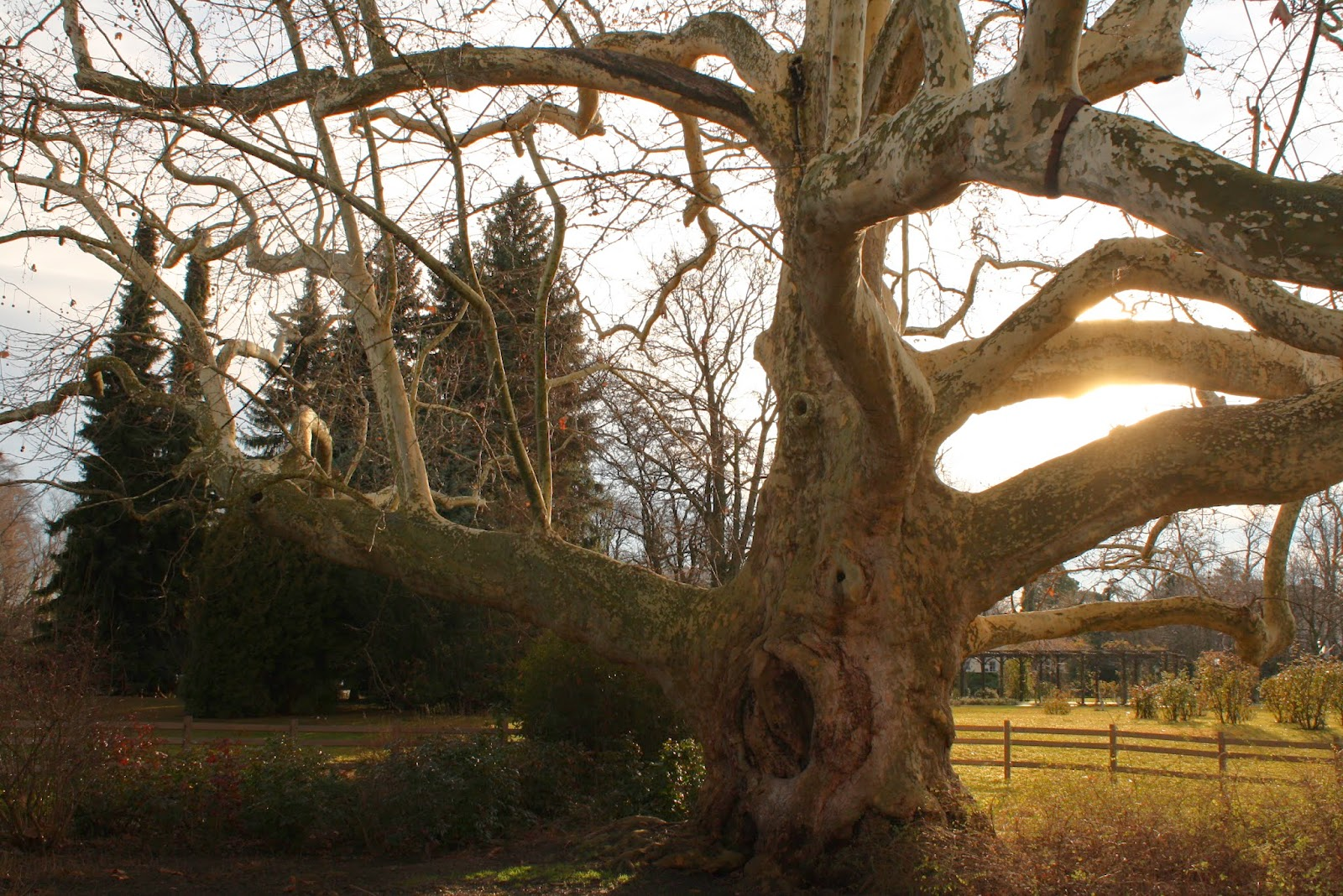
Multiple tree hollows in a plane tree in Baden, Austria

A tree hollow or tree hole is a semi-enclosed cavity which has naturally formed in the trunk or branch of a tree. They are found mainly in old trees, whether living or not. Hollows form in many species of trees. They are a prominent feature of natural forests and woodlands, and act as a resource or habitat for fungi and a number of vertebrate and invertebrate animals.

Hollows may form as the result of physiological stress from natural forces causing the excavating and exposure of the heartwood. Forces may include wind, fire, heat, lightning, rain, attack from insects (such as ants or beetles), bacteria, or fungi. Also, trees may self-prune, dropping lower branches as they reach maturity, exposing the area where the branch was attached. Many animals further develop the hollows using instruments such as their beak, teeth or claws.

The size of hollows may depend on the age of the tree. For example, eucalypts develop hollows at all ages, but only from when the trees are 120 years old do they form hollows suitable for vertebrates, and it may take 220 years for hollows suitable for larger species to form.

Hollows in fallen timber are also very important for animals such as echidnas, numbats, chuditch and many reptiles. In streams, hollow logs may be important to aquatic animals for shelter and egg attachment.

Hollows are an important habitat for many wildlife species, especially where the use of hollows is obligate, as this means no other resource would be a feasible substitute. Animals may use hollows as diurnal or nocturnal shelter sites, as well as for rearing young, feeding, thermoregulation, and to facilitate ranging behaviour and dispersal. While use may also be opportunistic, rather than obligate, it may be difficult to determine the nature of a species' relationship to hollows—it may vary across a species' range, or depend on climatic conditions.

Animals will select a hollow based on factors including entrance size and shape, depth, and degree of insulation. Such factors greatly affect the frequency and seasonality of hollow use.

Especially in Europe, entomologists are interested in the use of hollows by invertebrates. One beetle associated with hollow trees, Osmoderma eremita, has been given the highest priority by the European Union's Habitat Directive.

== Description ==
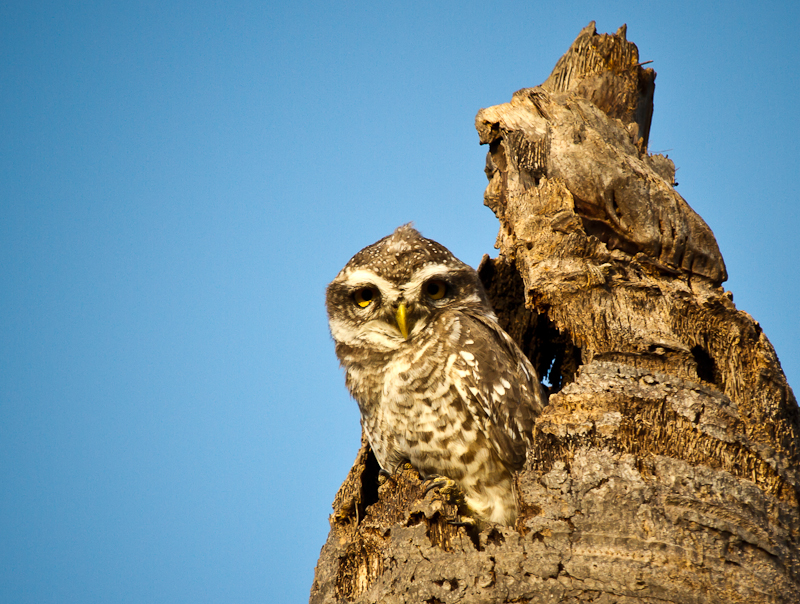
Indian spotted owlet in tree hollow

A tree hollow is a cavity in a living tree. Tree holes can be caused when an injury to the tree, such as breakage of a limb, creates an opening through the bark and exposes the sapwood. The sapwood is attacked by fungi and bacteria, which form a cavity in the bole of the tree. The resulting cavity can fill with water, thus becoming a type of phytotelma. Therefore, there are wet and dry tree holes. Tree holes are important habitats for many animals, such as Ceratopogonidae, Chironomidae, the common merganser, toucans, woodpeckers, and bluebirds. Tree holes can be important in the maintenance and spread of some diseases, for example La Crosse encephalitis. Hollows may be an adaptive trait for trees as animals provide the host tree with fertilizer.

== Non-excavated hollows ==
Contrary to excavated hollows that are directly caused by animals such as woodpeckers, non-excavated hollows are hollows that are created after a tree has been damaged and decays because of fungal growth. This damage can be caused by insects, foraging birds, fire, lightning, snow, frost, and physical abrasion from rocks, falling trees, dendrotelms, and, circumstantially, large herbivores such as red deer (Cervus elaphus) or the European bison (Bison bonasus). In North America, woodpeckers play a keystone role creating holes for other birds or mammals. In Asia, data is deficient but here woodpeckers do not seem to be as much of a keystone group. In Europe, woodpeckers are not seen as keystone species, as most cavities are non-excavated and these are where the majority of hole-nesting songbirds choose to nest.

=== Types of non-excavated hollows ===
- Knotholes: Created from a branch snapping off of a main stem
- Chimneys: Created when a stem snaps and makes an upward-facing entrance
- Cracks: Created when a trunk splits
- Trunk holes: Created when a cavity forms in the main stem. If it is narrow and elongate, it is called a slit.

== Artificial hollows ==
Animals have been found to use artificial structures as substitutes for hollows. For example, pygmy possums in the chute of a grain silo; or pardalotes in the top, horizontal pipe of a children's swing. Purpose-built nest boxes, such as birdhouses and bat tubes, are also constructed for conservation and for wildlife observation. The size of the nest box, entry hole and placement height may be chosen in consideration of certain species. However, nestboxes have different microclimatic conditions and can therefore not be treated as direct substitutes. Natural hollows are generally preferred for habitat conservation.

Actual tree hollows can be created artificially by cutting into trees with chainsaws and partly covering the resulting hollows with timber faceplates. These are readily used by arboreal animals including mammals and birds. Compared to nest boxes, they last longer and give better protection from external temperatures.

== Around the world ==
Conservation of hollow-using fauna is an issue in many parts of the world. In North America, recovery of the eastern bluebird (Sialia sialis) has required nest boxes due to the loss of natural hollows. The scarcity of dead, hollow-bearing trees in Scandinavian forests is a key threatening process to native bird life. In Sweden, almost half of red-listed species are dependent on dead hollow-bearing trees or logs.

=== Australia ===
In Australia, 304 vertebrate species are known to use tree hollows in Australia: 29 amphibians, 78 reptiles, 111 birds, 86 mammals. Approximately 100 of these are now rare, threatened or near-threatened on Australian State or Commonwealth legislation, in part because of the removal of hollow-bearing trees.

Threats to hollows include: native forest silviculture, firewood collection, rural dieback (such as from inundation and salinity), grazing by cattle, and land clearing. Additionally, pest and introduced species such as the common myna and western honey bee (Apis mellifera) compete with native species for hollows; domestic and feral cats and black rats prey on hollow-using animals and have been damaging especially to island populations; and some native hollow-using species have increased population densities or expanded their ranges since European settlement, such as the galah, common brushtail possum and the little corella and compete with less common native species.

=== Russia, China, Korea ===
Asian black bears, also known as Himalayan bears (Lat.: Ursus thibetanus), in northern parts of their range, such as Russian province Primorye, China, and both Koreas, prefer spend winter periods in large tree hollows, where females also give birth to cubs. Threats include massive deforestation in these countries, combined with direct poaching of wintering bears—with selective destruction of the best hollow trees. In Russia, attempts (sometimes successful) are made to restore such broken trees. Unfortunately, only a small portion of all damaged trees can be restored in Primorye, where forests are basically logged without taking to account needs of large fauna.

== Gallery ==
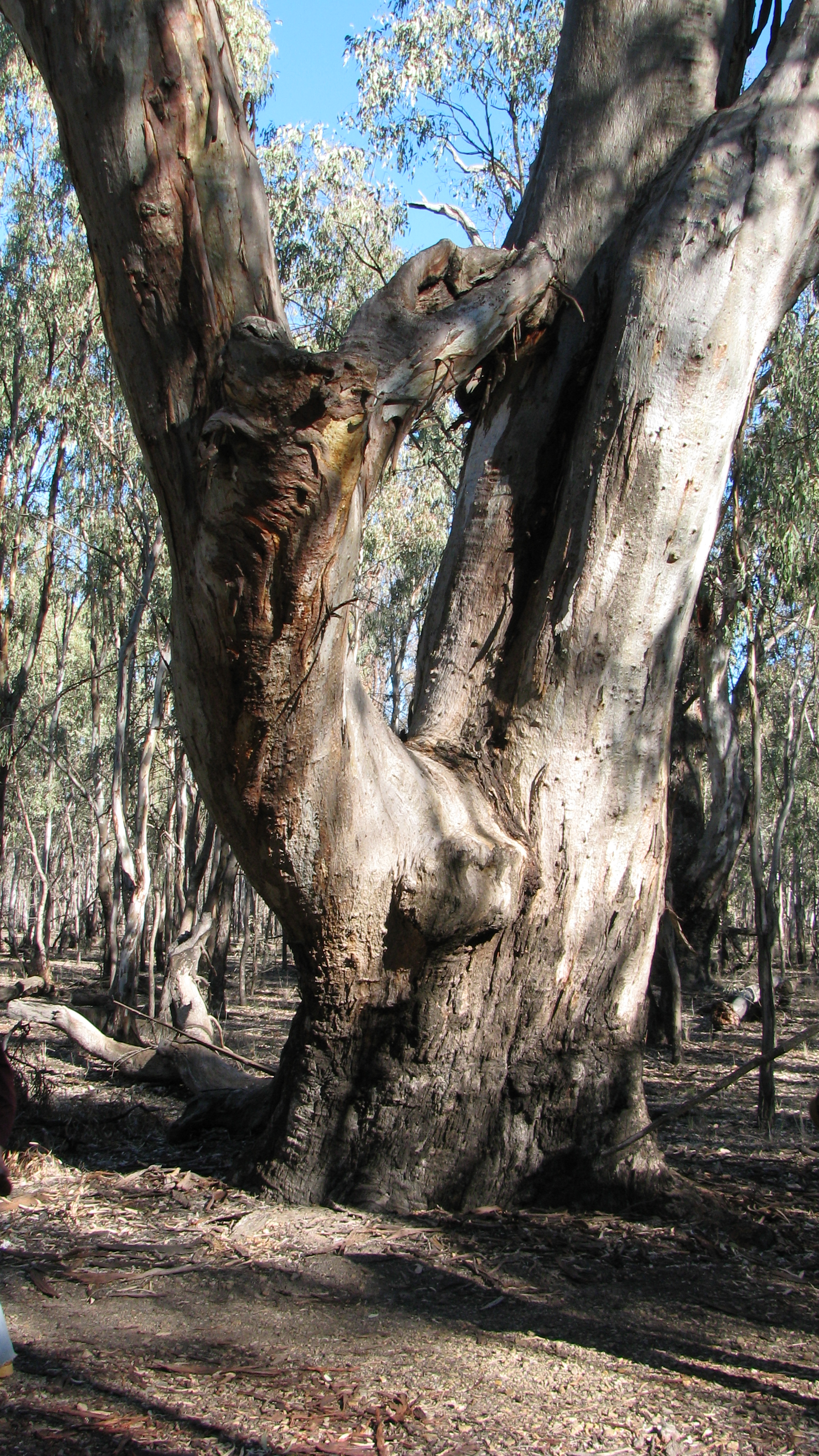
A river red gum, with hollows. The younger trees surrounding it would generally not yet have developed hollows suitable for vertebrate species.

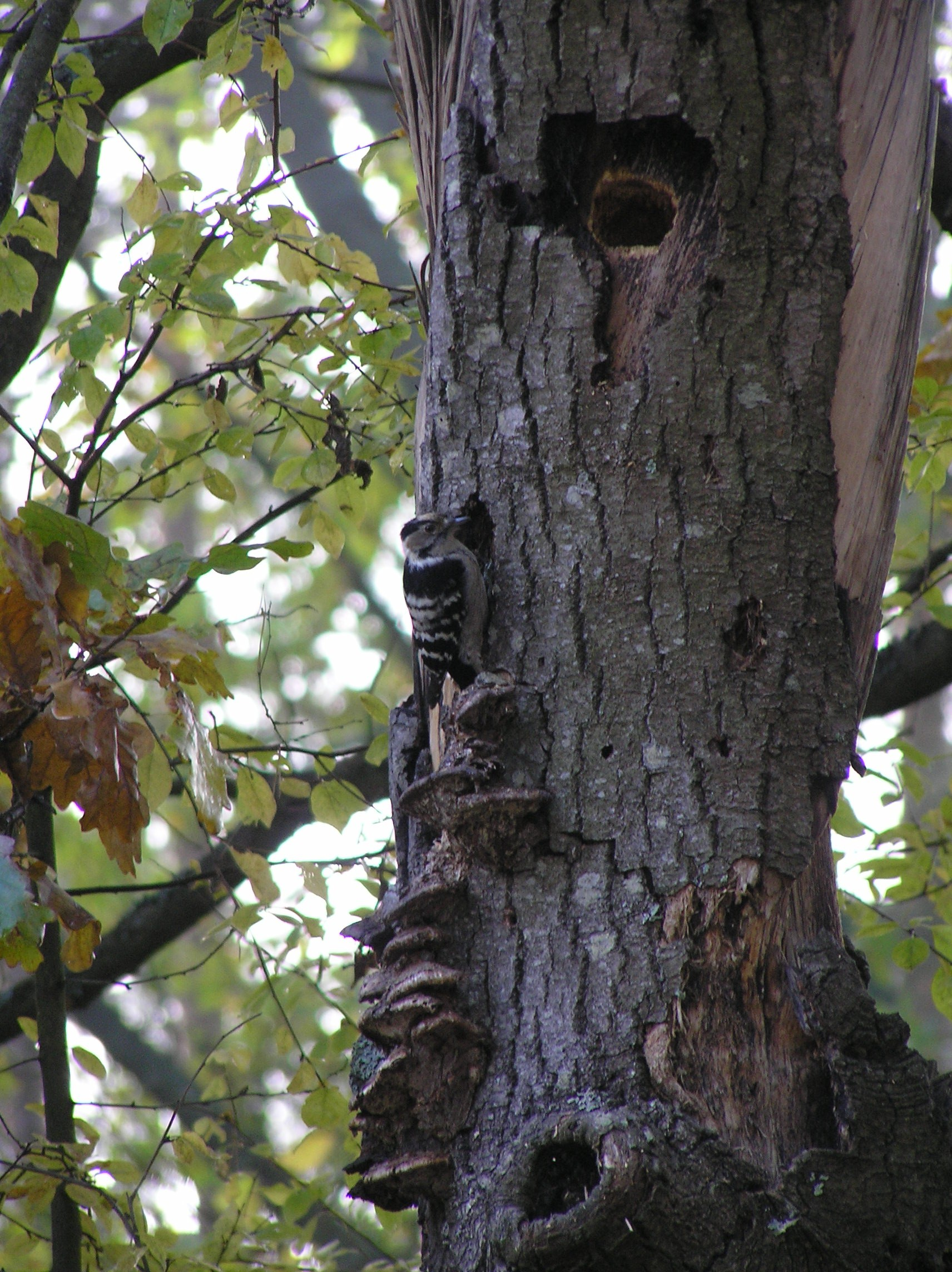
Hollows excavated by the lesser spotted woodpecker (Picoides minor). Also fungus, which may also help in the formation of hollows through the decomposition of heartwood.

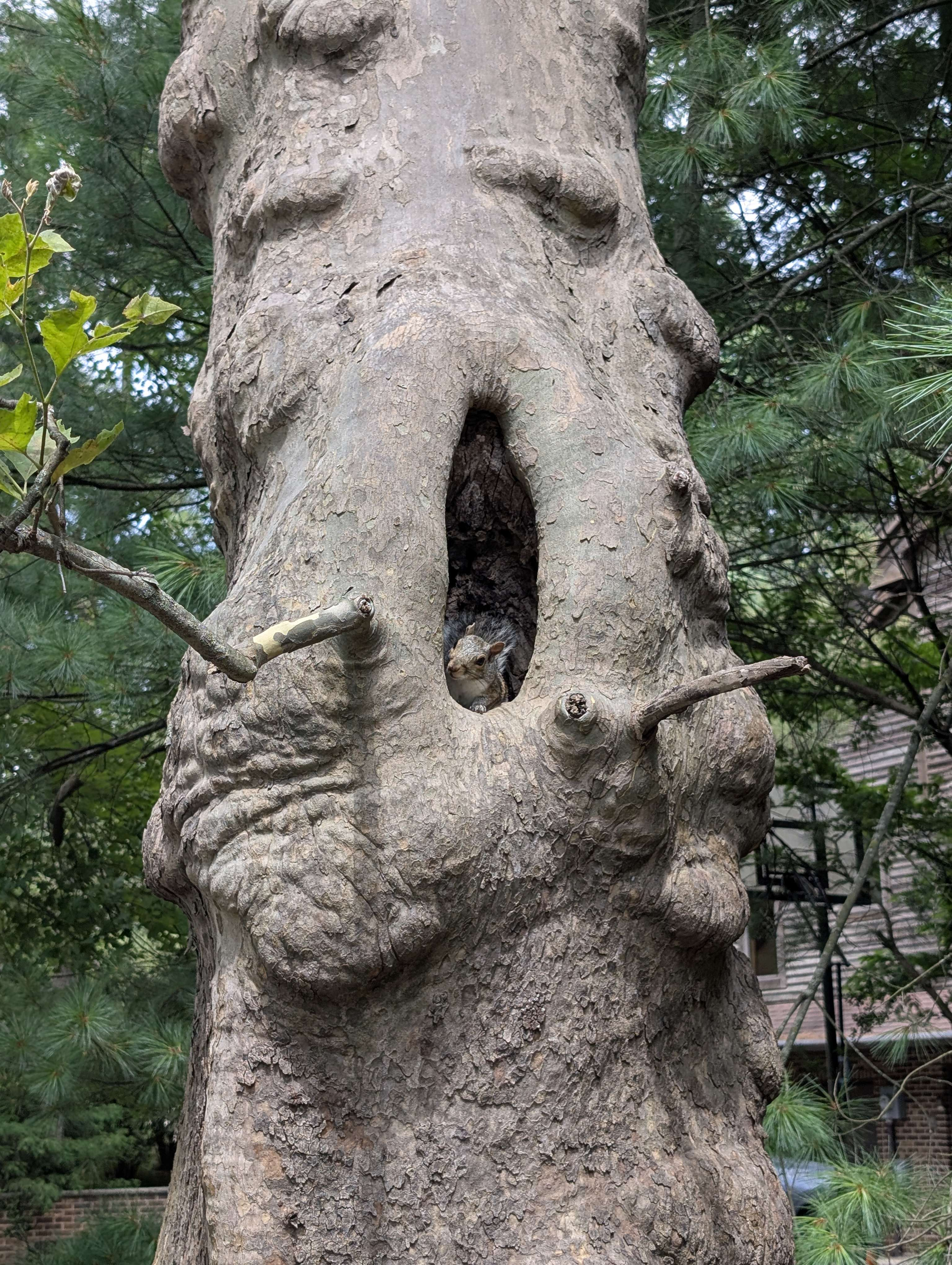
A hollow of an American beech inhabited by an Eastern gray squirrel. Hollows are commonly made into dreys by tree squirrel species.

== See also ==
- Nest box
- Snag
- Tree throw
