= Pit-and-mound topography =

Ground features formed by uprooted trees

Pit and mounds are small, persistent microtopographical features that present themselves after a disturbance event occurs and uproots trees via windthrow. The uprooted tree falls, and a pit forms in the forest floor where the root mass and associated soil matrix used to be. Eventually after a period of time in which the roots decay, the associated soil matrix that was pulled out of the ground with the roots falls back to the ground, creating a corresponding mound.

== Formation of a pit ==
A pit, as defined above, is formed when pressure is applied to the trunk and crown of the tree that is more powerful than the root and associated soil's ability to hold the tree upright and in place and knocks the tree down. This toppling of the tree can be caused by a multitude of different types of forest disturbance. Wind may blow the tree down; snow may accumulate and put excessive weight on the tree; the tree's roots may have decayed to a point where they are not strong enough to hold the tree upright. Soil conditions also play a role in the ability of the tree to remain upright. Wet soil can loosen the hold a tree's roots have on the soil, and dry soil can help hold the tree in place.

== Formation of a mound ==
A mound, as defined above, is formed on average from five to ten years after the formation of a pit. The root mass must decay to an extent where the soil matrix that was suspended with it when it toppled over can slough off on to the ground near the corresponding pit. The necessity of the decay of the root mass is what causes this lag time. In more cold or dry climates, the rate of decay is slower and this time lag may be extended.

== Disturbances ==
=== Disturbance scale ===
Pit and mounds always occur on a fine spatial scale, being the result of only one tree felling. Commonly they are a product of windthrow, but they can also be caused by other factors. Large amounts of snow accumulation on tree boughs or extensive root decay are other possible causes for tree uprooting. Pit and mounds have been analyzed on both on a small scale and larger scale forest systems. It has been observed that they can act as important soil disruptors and microsites for biodiversity and plant establishment.

=== Microclimatic conditions ===
It has been observed that pit and mounds on an individual basis generally have specific climatic and pedological characteristics. Mounds are generally observed to be warmer and drier than the forest floor or the corresponding pit; Similarly, the pit is generally found to be colder and have a higher soil moisture content than either the forest floor or the mound. One notable instance where there is an exception to the general observation is when a snow layer has fallen. The pit becomes insulated by the snow layer and then in some instances is observed to be warmer than the mound.

Mounds receive the highest amount of photosynthetically active radiation (PAR) and pits the lowest amount. Pits also have much higher amounts of leaf litter than mounds, who have high tendencies to erode.

=== Nutrient content and plant establishment ===
Studies on pit and mounds generally have at least five sampling sites per each pit and mound sampled. These areas, generally, are the top of the mound, bottom of the pit, side of the mound, edge of the pit, and an undisturbed forest floor area. Studies have observed that both pits and mounds generally have lower carbon and nitrogen soil content than the undisturbed forest floor, although they have carbon to nitrogen ratios that are not significantly different from the ratios observed on the forest floor.

Mounds are observed to be generally more nutrient poor and fewer plants establish on them in comparison to pits for several reasons. Mounds tend to erode and thus are more unstable than the forest floor or the pit. The surface of the mound also contains very little organic matter because it is mainly soil that was uprooted from the mineral horizons of the soil layer. This coupled with the observation that seed deposition rates are lower for mounds than pits, makes plant establishment on mounds unlikely and problematic for the plant.

Conversely, many studies have found that species richness and overall number of established plants is found to be statistically higher on mounds than in pits. It was experimentally determined that the leaf litter accumulation that occurs within a pit has a large effect on the lack of species diversity or establishment that occurs there. In fact, when scientists removed the leaf litter and monitored the species establishment within the pit, it was found that the diversity and number began to resemble that that occurred on mounds. Multiple studies have found that on the forest floor a high or dense amount of leaf litter or dead organic matter corresponds to a low amount of species diversity as well.

== Biodiversity ==
=== Macrofauna ===
Little information is available on how macrofauna are affected by the presence of pit and mounds in a forested landscape. One would believe they would benefit from the presence of coarse woody debris as habitat and new flora that establish in the pit and mounds, but there is a lack of published evidence.

One macrofauna species that has received attention is the earthworm population in a lowland temperate rainforest of Belgium. It was observed that both earthworm speciation and biomass differed based on location within the pit and mound microsites examined. Undisturbed sites near the pit and mounds had the highest amount of species diversity and biomass compared to either a pit or a mound. The undisturbed sites contained species of earthworm that were not present in either the pit or mound sample site. An explanation towards why there were less earthworms present in the pit or mound was that within the mound there was more dry, mineralized soil present and less organic matter due to the uprooting of the tree. The pits examined were found to generally only contain one species of earthworm that was known to inhabit very moist soils. It was concluded that the pit microhabitat was too humid and water containing for most other species of earthworm.

== Knowledge gaps ==
What aspects of pit and mounds can be generalized and what effects they exert of the dynamism of the forest can be generalized is a currently evolving narrative. As more scientific literature crops up from around the world, it becomes more apparent what aspects of the pit and mounds occur in most any biome they are found in. As it is, there is not enough scientific data to allow much extrapolation from forest to forest in regard to pit and mound knowledge.

=== Location of experimentation and data collection ===
Virtually all of the scientific knowledge about pit and mounds and their impact on forest heterogeneity and other dynamics comes from the Northern Hemisphere, particularly the Relic forests of Europe and the Temperate rainforests of Eastern Canada and Southeast Alaska. It can be argued that because pit and mounds occur on such a small scale, they may impact forest in the southern hemisphere in a different way. Until information is collected, it will be unknown.

=== Herbivory ===
Studies of pit and mound on a large time scale may be affected by the presence of herbivores in the area. A herbivore may preferentially browse certain seedlings that grow on either a pit or a mound and will mask any other variables that might be contributing to why those seedlings are establishing in a pit or mound by skewing the final counts of the growing plants.

=== Microbiological communities ===
One would assume that on a microbial level a disturbance that results in a pit and mound event would lead to a greater heterogeneity on the microbial level as multiple soil horizons are uplifted and mixed. However, little scientific data exists on the microbial population and its changes due to a pit and mound creation.

=== Impact on silviculture ===
There is no scientific data on the effects, if any, of either the synthetic or natural creation of pit and mounds in a managed forest and the effects it has on the growth or health of the forest.
