= Forest dynamics =

Biotic and abiotic ecosystem influences

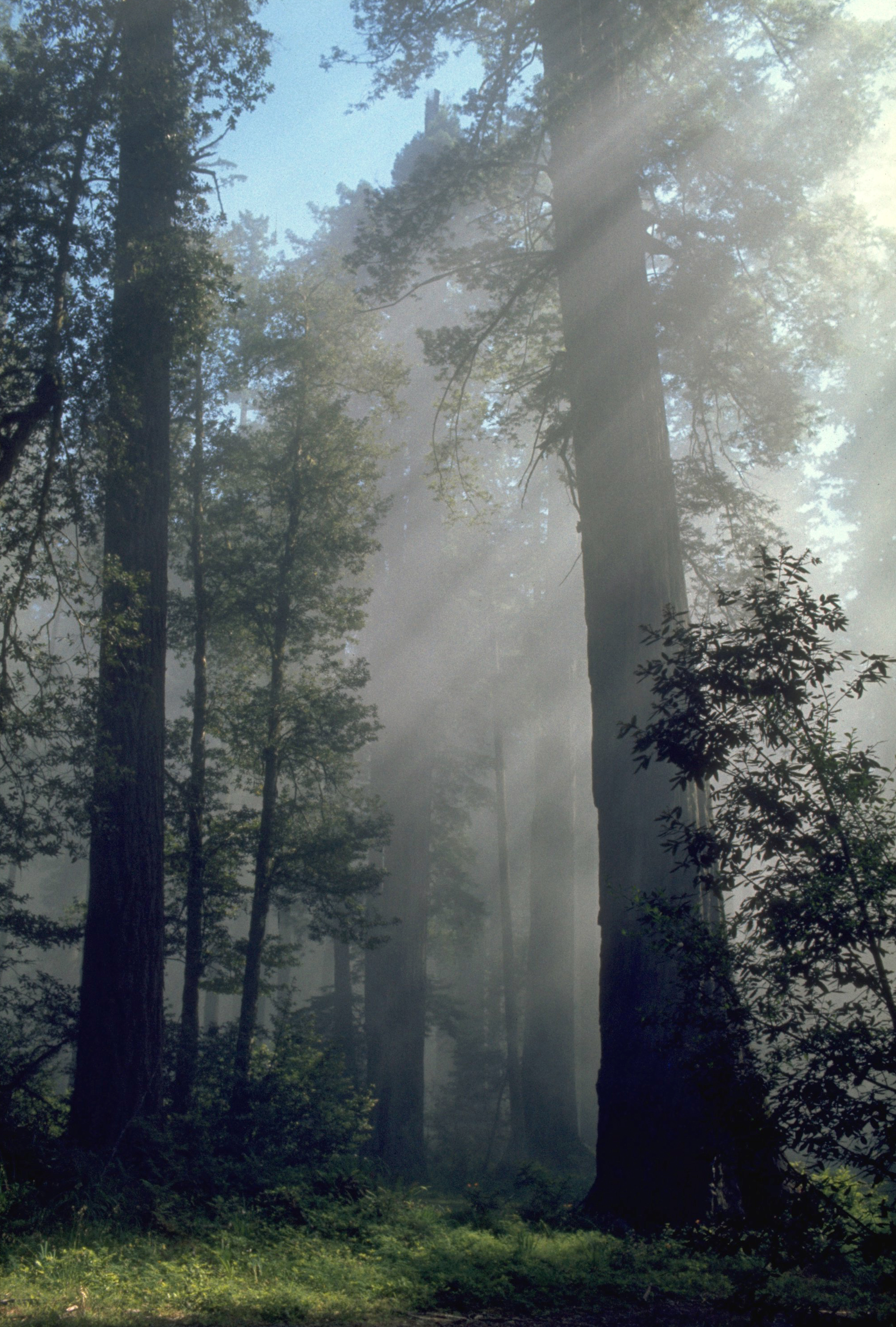
Sequoia sempervirens, that can live for 1000-2000 years, in Redwood National Park

Forest dynamics are the underlying physical and biological forces that shape and change a forest ecosystem. The continuous state of change in forests can be summarized with two basic elements: disturbance and succession.

== Disturbance ==
Forest disturbances are events that cause change in the structure and composition of a forest ecosystem, beyond the growth and death of individual organisms. Disturbances can vary in frequency and intensity, and include natural disasters such as fire, landslides, wind, volcanic eruptions, rare meteor impacts, outbreaks of insects, fungi, and other pathogens, animal-caused effects such as grazing and trampling, and anthropogenic disturbances such as warfare, logging, pollution, the clearing of land for urbanization or agriculture, and the introduction of invasive species. Not all disturbances are destructive or negative to the overall forest ecosystem. Many natural disturbances allow for renewal and growth and often release necessary nutrients.

Small-scale disturbances are the key to creating and maintaining diversity and heterogeneity within a forest. Small-scale disturbances are events such as single-tree blowdowns, which create gaps that let light through the canopy to the understory and forest floor. This available light allows early-successional shade-intolerant species to colonize and maintain a population within the dominant forest, leading to the complex spatial mosaic forest structure recognized as old-growth. This process is referred to as patch dynamics or gap dynamics and has been described across many types of forests, including tropical, temperate, and boreal.

The sets and patterns of natural disturbances that characterize a particular area or ecosystem are referred to as the ecosystem's disturbance regime. A natural community is closely linked with its natural disturbance regime. For example, temperate and boreal rainforests typically have a disturbance regime consisting of high-frequency but small-scale events, resulting in a highly complex forest dominated by very old trees. In contrast, forests that have a disturbance regime consisting of high-severity stand-replacing events, such as frequent fires, tend to be more uniform in structure and have relatively young tree stands.

== Succession ==
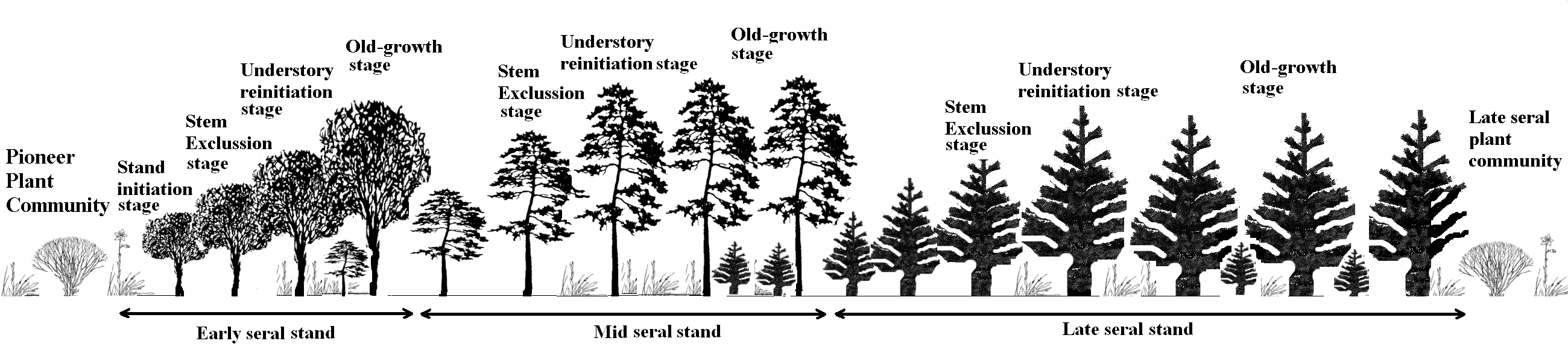
Stand dynamics stages during succession.

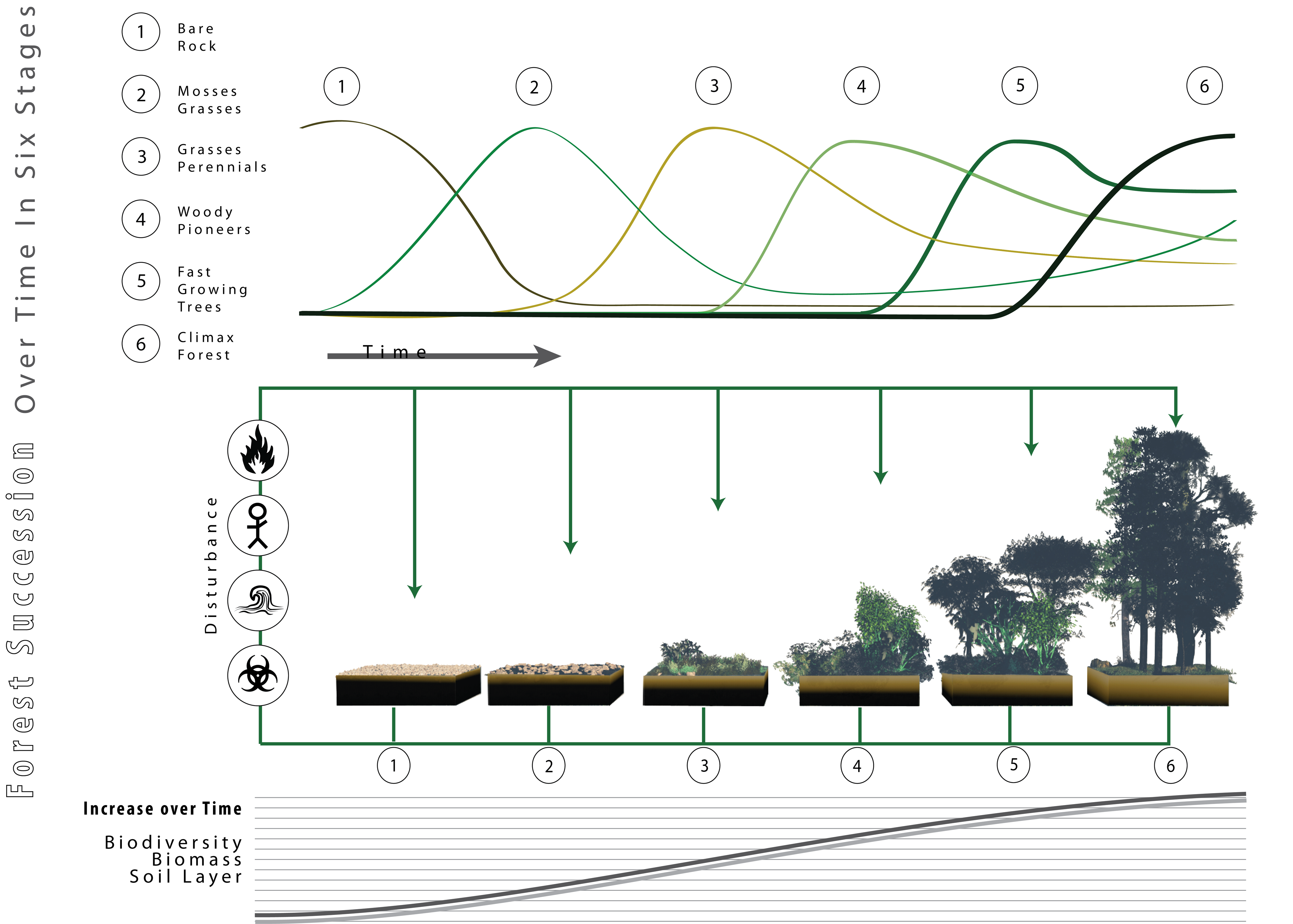
An abstract diagram showing forest succession over time. Increase in biomass, biodiversity and soil thickness are also shown, as well as the fluctuation of different plant communities over the process of succession.

Forest succession is the process by which species recover and regenerate after a disturbance. The type of disturbance, the climate and weather conditions, the presence of colonizing species, and the interactions among species all influence the path that succession will take. Species diversity and composition fluctuate throughout succession. The classic model of succession is known as relay floristics and refers to a relay of dominant species. After a stand-replacing disturbance, shade-intolerant species colonize and grow into a dominant canopy, but due to their shade-intolerance they are unable to regenerate under their own canopy; the understory (composed of shade-tolerant species) gradually replaces the canopy, and due to its shade-tolerance it can regenerate under its own canopy and therefore becomes the dominant species. Often succession is not so complete or directed as the relay floristics model describes. Species can be mid-tolerant of shade and survive by taking advantage of small amounts of light coming through the canopy, and further disturbances can create small gaps. These and other factors can lead to a mixture of dominant species and a not so obvious “end” to succession (climax community).

Many successional trajectories follow a basic four-stage development pattern. The first of these stages, stand initiation, occurs after a major disturbance and involves many species arriving in the area of abundant light and nutrients. The second stage, stem exclusion, describes the growth and competition of these species as resources become less available; likely one or a few species outcompetes and becomes stand-dominating. The third stage, understory reinitiation, involves further disturbance and the creation of gaps; at this point stratification develops, with layers of canopy, midstory, and understory appearing. The final stage, known as old-growth, is the extension and completion of the understory reinitiation; a complex multi-aged and multi-layered forest has developed.

== Considering climate change ==
Forests are sensitive to climate, and so climate change can have a great effect on the dynamics of the ecosystem. Rising carbon dioxide levels can increase the productivity and growth of trees, which will then decrease as other nutrients become limiting. Changes in temperature and precipitation can affect the success of various species and the resulting species assemblage. Many factors of climate change can also affect an ecosystem’s disturbance regime, making the forest more or less susceptible to different disturbances and altering or even preventing recovery after a disturbance.

== Importance ==
Forests offer many ecosystem services including timber, fresh water, carbon storage, and areas of recreation. To conserve these services, along with the natural habitat and biodiversity that forests provide, understanding the dynamics that are creating and maintaining the forests is a priority. Forestry and silviculture operations require a thorough comprehension of forest dynamics in order to implement effective management and conservation techniques.

== See also ==
- Afforestation
- Stand level modelling
