= Ian Mantle =

British motor vehicle engineer (1920-2010)

- Born: Benjamin Ian Gilmour Mantle; 6 June 1920; Biggleswade, Bedfordshire, England, United Kingdom
- Died: 2 August 2010 (aged 90); Cambridge
- Occupations: Businessman, Rally driver
- Years active: 1945–1990
- Known for: Chairman of Mantles Group Limited
- Spouse: Mary
- Children: Jill, Peter and John

Ian Mantle (1920-2010) was a motor vehicle engineer and motor trade entrepreneur who became an important post war influence in the development of touring caravans. He was also a notable rally driver of the Berkeley Sports Car made by Berkeley Cars, whose fibre glass frame prospered in races during the 1950s. During the 1960s Mantle specialised in caravan rallying winning the Ken Wharton Memorial Five Nations championship.

== Education and War Service ==
Ian Mantle was born in Biggleswade in 1920 the son of a local businessman who had started a motor vehicle company. He was educated at Bedford Modern School before joining the automobile engineering firm Caffyns in Brighton, East Sussex.

At the outbreak of the Second World War Mantle served with the Royal Air Force employed as an engineer tasked with solving logistical problems of keeping vehicles and armaments serviceable during the difficult campaigns of Italy and North Africa. On demobilization in 1945, he took over the family business in Biggleswade.

== Entrepreneurial and sporting career ==
Mantle spent the remainder of the 1940s and the 1950s establishing the Mantle Group to include dealerships for cars, caravans and mobile home parks in the Home Counties. A man prepared to innovate he worked with Sam Alper to improve and develop touring caravans making them more stable and easier to control through chassis, suspension and wheel design

In partnership with Sprite Caravans he established a world towing endurance record at Monza in Italy. This involved a Ford Zodiac towing a Sprite caravan around the aerodrome at Monza for 24 hours at an average speed of 70 mph. Mantle enjoyed rallying caravans and was good enough to win the Caravan Road Rally four times during the 1970s. In the mid 1950s Mantle was part of a team of engineers led by Lawrie Bond of Bond Cars notoriety who developed the Berkeley, a small sporting vehicle powered by an air-cooled motorcycle engine. Berkeley Cars were manufactured at the Berkeley Coachworks owned by Charles Panter in Biggleswade. The fibreglass structure proved an advantage and for some years the Berkeley won some important races including one at Goodwood in September 1956 where it was driven by Stirling Moss. Mantle was behind the wheel in the Netherlands Tulip Rally when the Berkeley engine failed whilst he was in the lead. Mantle’s association with Berkeley lasted until the firm was liquidated in 1960.

Mantle was a good enough rally driver to win a number of important races including the British Rallycross Driving Association Flather Star Autotest Championship in 1956. Autotesting involves a series of tests, generally around traffic cones, to measure precision driving skills and Mantle excelled captaining the England team in the Ken Wharton Memorial Five Nations championship on BBC Grandstand during the 1960s.

Mantle retired in 1990 and was succeeded by his son John Mantle as managing director of the Mantle Group. Mantle served as a magistrate in Biggleswade and from 1986 to 1991 he was chairman of the organising committee of the Caravan and Camping Exhibition at Earls Court.

== Cultural reference ==
The Ian Mantle Trophy is contested each year at the Sprite/Sterling National Autotest Championship.
