= Stratton Upper School =

British school in Biggleswade, Bedfordshire

Stratton School
- Biggleswade, Bedfordshire, SG18 8JB; United Kingdom

Information
- Type: Academy
- Established: 1950
- Trust: Cambridge Meridian Academies Trust
- Department for Education URN: 137886 Tables
- Ofsted: Reports
- Head teacher: Sam Farmer
- Executive headteacher: Andy Daly
- Staff: 112 total, 49 teachers
- Gender: Mixed
- Age: 11 to 18
- Capacity: 1320
- Houses: Adlam, Chaundler, Franklin, King, Turing
- Colours: Purple, green, blue, yellow, red
- Website: www.stratton.beds.sch.uk

Stratton School is a British mixed school and sixth form located in Biggleswade, Bedfordshire. It is an academy school, governed by the Cambridge Meridian Academies Trust.

== Profile ==
The main body of the school educates both male and female students aged between 11 and 16, mainly from the town of Biggleswade and some surrounding villages (including some from Cambridgeshire). In addition, the school offers further education facilities for students up to the age of 19 through its Sixth Form, singled out for praise in the school's most recent OFSTED inspection. The schools values are Respect, Responsibility and Pride.

The school has provision for STEM (science, technology, engineering and mathematics) subjects including a science centre containing twelve labs opened in 2017. The school site also features a playing field, a cafeteria, a music block, a drama studio, a sports hall and an assembly hall with a stage, often used to host various exhibitions and events. Some of these facilities are available to let via the school finance office.

Stratton Upper School is designated as a training school hosting trainees from various training providers including the Bedfordshire Schools Training Partnership SCITT and the University of Bedfordshire. As a training school the school offers a postgraduate programme as well as a Graduate Teacher Programme, and an Access to Education Scheme. The pedagogic practice within the school is also heavily focussed on leading educational research.

The school has an educational partnership with Norwich City FC to provide training in football alongside qualifications obtained within the sixth form. On the pitch, students take part in daily training sessions delivered by staff and represent Norwich City FC in a competitive fixture programme against other professional clubs, semi-professional sides and college programmes. In 2021, the school established itself as one of the best performing sixth forms in the country as its results placed it in the top ten per cent of schools nationally for value added performance.

== Controversy ==
In 2016, then head of sixth form at the school Mr Richard Merrett was found to be sending inappropriate messages to multiple pupils.

In 2018 Stratton Education trust was issued a Financial notice to improve (FNtI). It was found that there was generally poor management of finances and contracts. Invoices up to £51,395.22 were found with no description or details of its contents. Questions were also raised around the appointment of contracts for the new £8 million science block with no formal tender. It is speculated that this was involved in the sudden departure of the then headteacher Robert Watson.

In 2019 the closure of the school farm divided the community with a petition to keep it open reaching over 1600 signatures. It closed less than 1 year after the governors assured that the farm was at no risk of closing

== House system ==
The house system was introduced in 2021. Each house is linked to a curriculum area and the names are associated with inspirational people linked to that area.

The house names are:

- Adlam, (humanities),
  named after Tom Edwin Adlam, Bedfordshire soldier who survived WW1 and WW2 and was awarded the Victoria Cross
- Chaundler, (English and languages),
  named after Christine Chaundler, prolific children's author from Biggleswade
- Franklin, (science and technology),
  named after Rosalind Franklin, Biophysicist whose work led to understanding the molecular structure of DNA
- King, (PE/sport and creative arts),
  named after Matt King, an inspirational ex-student of Stratton who overcame exceptional challenges to achieve his aspirations
- Turing, (mathematics, and computing & commerce),
  named after Alan Turing, WW2 code breaker and the influence behind the development of theoretical computer science

== History ==
The school was originally constructed during the late 1940s, being built in such a fashion that it could be used as a hospital in the event of another major conflict akin to the Second World War. The school first opened its doors to students in 1950 as "Stratton Grammar Technical School," though much of the facility remained unfinished at this time and construction would continue over the following years, with the site not finally completed until 1956.

In 1976 the facility was one of many grammar schools in Britain during the period to become a comprehensive. This culminated in a transformative period during the mid-2000s, with the school consistently rated highly by Ofsted and achieving successful results. Stratton was subsequently the first school in the Biggleswade area to apply for and gain academy status in 2011. The Stratton Education Trust was formed a year later, and between 2012 and 2017 was also responsible for governing Gamlingay Village College. Gamlingay Village College then followed Gamlingay First School by joining Camtrust.

The school was designated as a training school in 2003.

An extensive expansion of the site was completed in 2018, with the opening of a new science block and the remodelling of the school's façade.

From 1955 till 2019 Stratton was one of only around 120 schools within the UK to have educational farms. Financial difficulties and lack of interest are cited as reason for the closure of the farm. As of April 2023 the farm is due to open as a community farm through a CiC.

The school joined the Cambridge Meridian Academy Trust in 2020.

The Norwich City FC partnership commenced in 2021.

== Headteachers ==
H. Blayney (1950–1973)
G. Suggitt (1973–1982)
B. Farman (1982–1996)
N. Bramwell (1996–2010)
R. Watson (2010–2018)
Ms R. Hodges (2018–2022)
Mr S. Farmer (2022–Present)

== Notable former pupils ==
- Chris Roycroft-Davis, Sun journalist
