= Biggleswade Urban District =

History of Bedfordshire

Coordinates: 52.087°N 0.266°W

Biggleswade
- Local Government District (1892–1894); Urban District (1894–1974)
- Population
  - 1901: 5,120
  - 1971: 9,390
- History
  - Created: 22 February 1892 (Local Government District); 31 December 1894 (Urban District)
  - Abolished: 31 March 1974
  - Succeeded by: Mid Bedfordshire
- Status: Local Government District (1892–1894); Urban District (1894–1974)
  - HQ: Biggleswade
- Contained within
  - County Council: Bedfordshire
- Map of boundary as of 1971

The town of Biggleswade in Bedfordshire, England, was administered as a Local Government District from 1892 to 1894 and an Urban District from 1894 to 1974.

== Formation ==
Prior to 1892 the town had formed part of the Biggleswade Rural Sanitary District, which had been created under the Public Health Acts of 1872 and 1875 covering the same area as the Biggleswade Poor Law Union. On 22 February 1892 a Local Government District was established for the town, covering the whole parish of Biggleswade, removing it from the Biggleswade Rural Sanitary District. The first meeting of the new Local Board was held at Biggleswade Town Hall on 22 April 1892. The first chairman was Charles Samuel Lindsell.

Under the Local Government Act 1894, Local Government Districts became Urban Districts from 31 December 1894. The Urban District Council first met under its new title on 16 January 1895, with Charles Lindsell continuing to serve as chairman. He had also been appointed chairman of the new Biggleswade Rural District Council the previous week, as well as serving as the chairman of the Board of Guardians.

== Premises ==
Until 1926 the council held its meetings at the Town Hall at 36 High Street, Biggleswade, which had been built in 1844 and occupies a prominent position in the town centre overlooking the Market Place. This building was privately owned but rented out to the council and other public bodies for meetings and other functions. The council held its last meeting at the Town Hall in September 1926. From October 1926 to February 1928 the council's meetings were held at the Masonic Rooms (also known as St Andrew's Rooms) on St Andrew's Street. The old Town Hall was sold by its owners, initially becoming a petrol station. The council did investigate whether it could purchase the building, but concluded that the estimated £4,000 cost was too high.

In October 1927 a new Magistrates' Court opened in Biggleswade. From March 1928 onwards the council held its meetings at this new Court House at 4 Saffron Road. The council's administrative office functions were carried out at 2 London Road, which was the office of the solicitor who acted as clerk to both the Biggleswade Urban District and the Biggleswade Rural District.

In 1952 the council purchased a large seventeenth-century house called Stratton House at 1 The Baulk. The council's staff moved into the building later that year, and a new council chamber was created there, being officially opened in February 1953. Stratton House remained the council's offices and meeting place until the council was abolished in 1974. The former gardens of Stratton House were used to provide a variety of other public buildings for the town, including a new library, fire station, ambulance station and police houses.

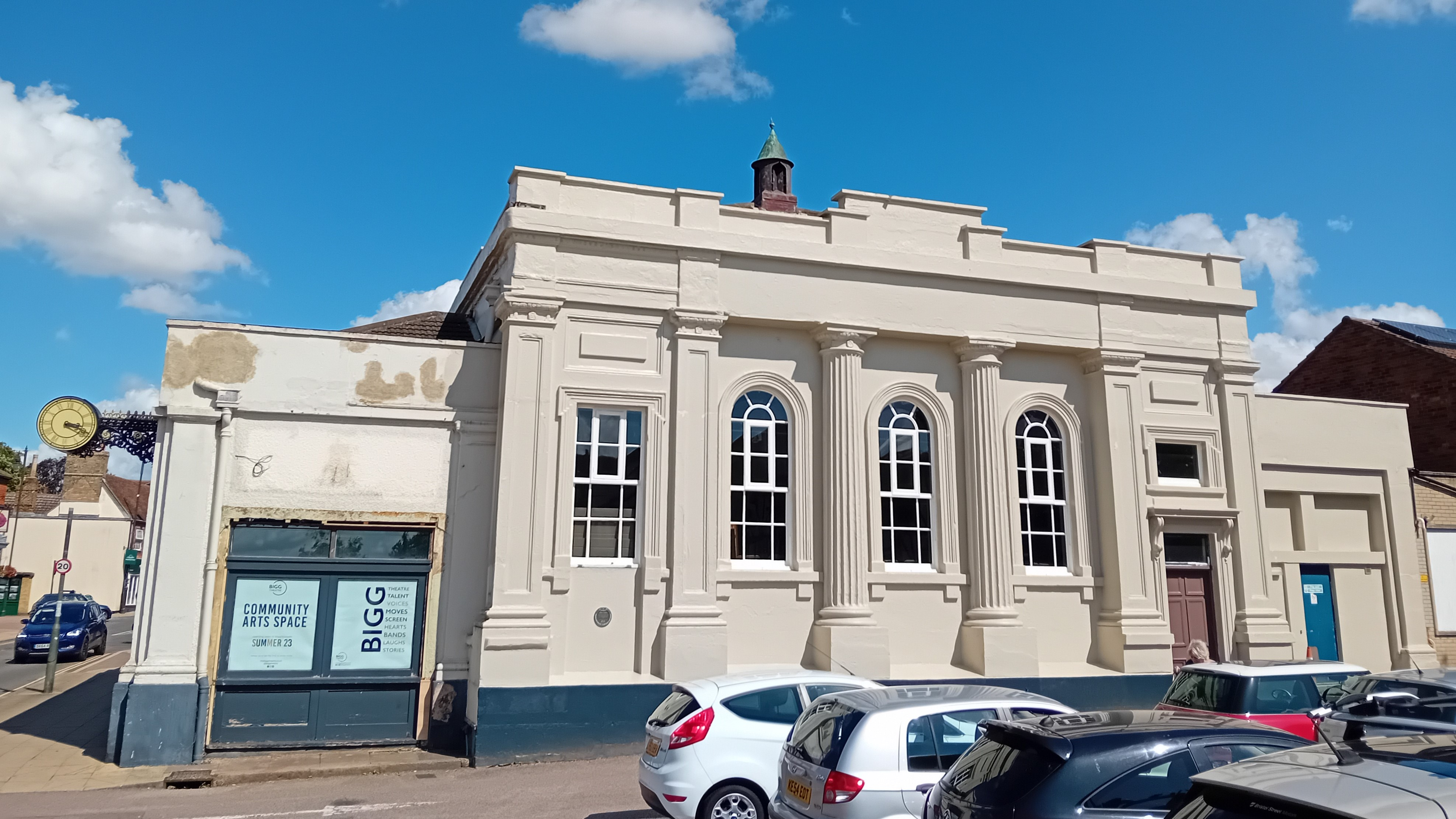
Town Hall, 36 High Street:
Meeting place 1892–1926

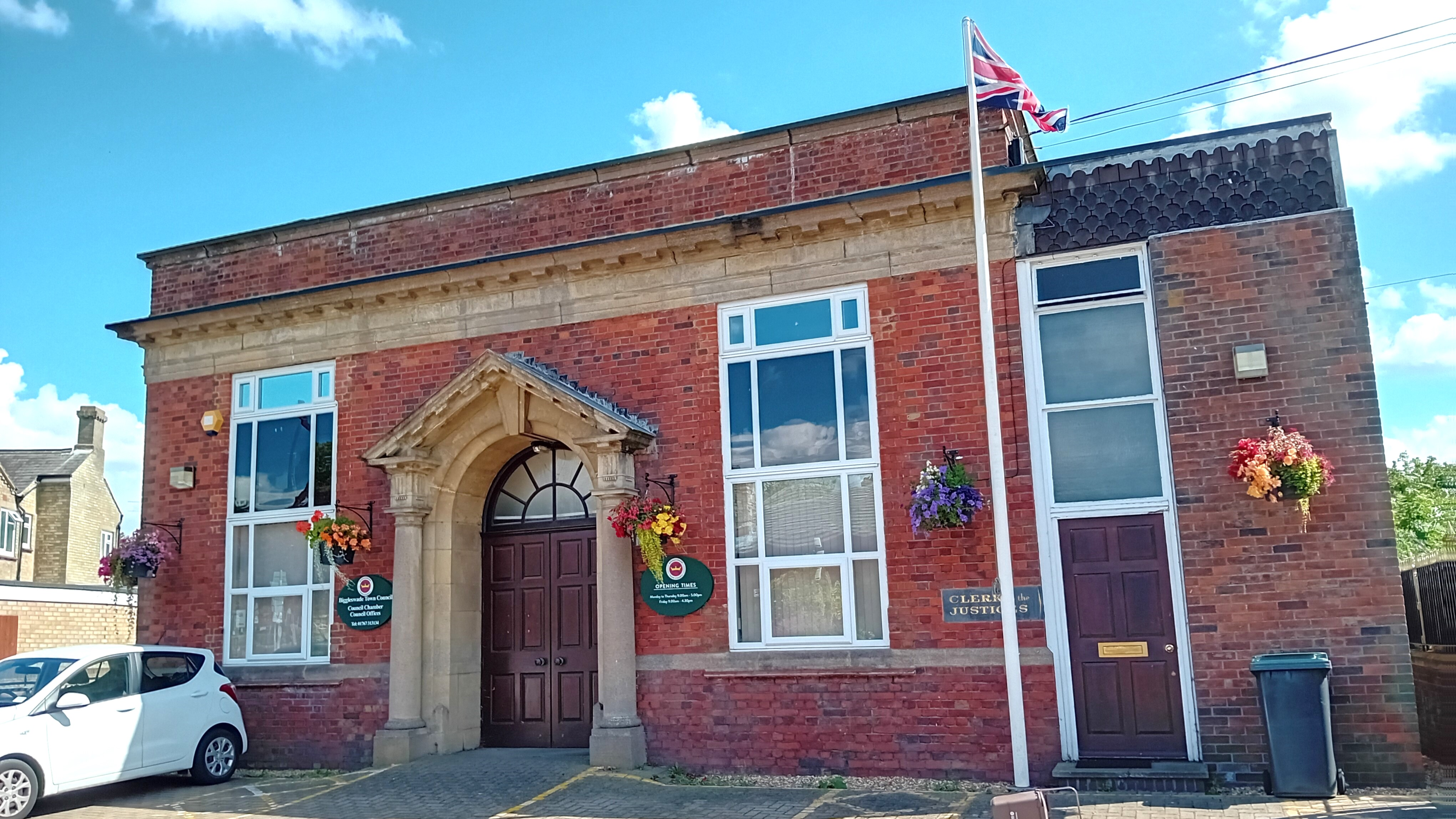
Court House, 4 Saffron Road:
Meeting place 1928–1952

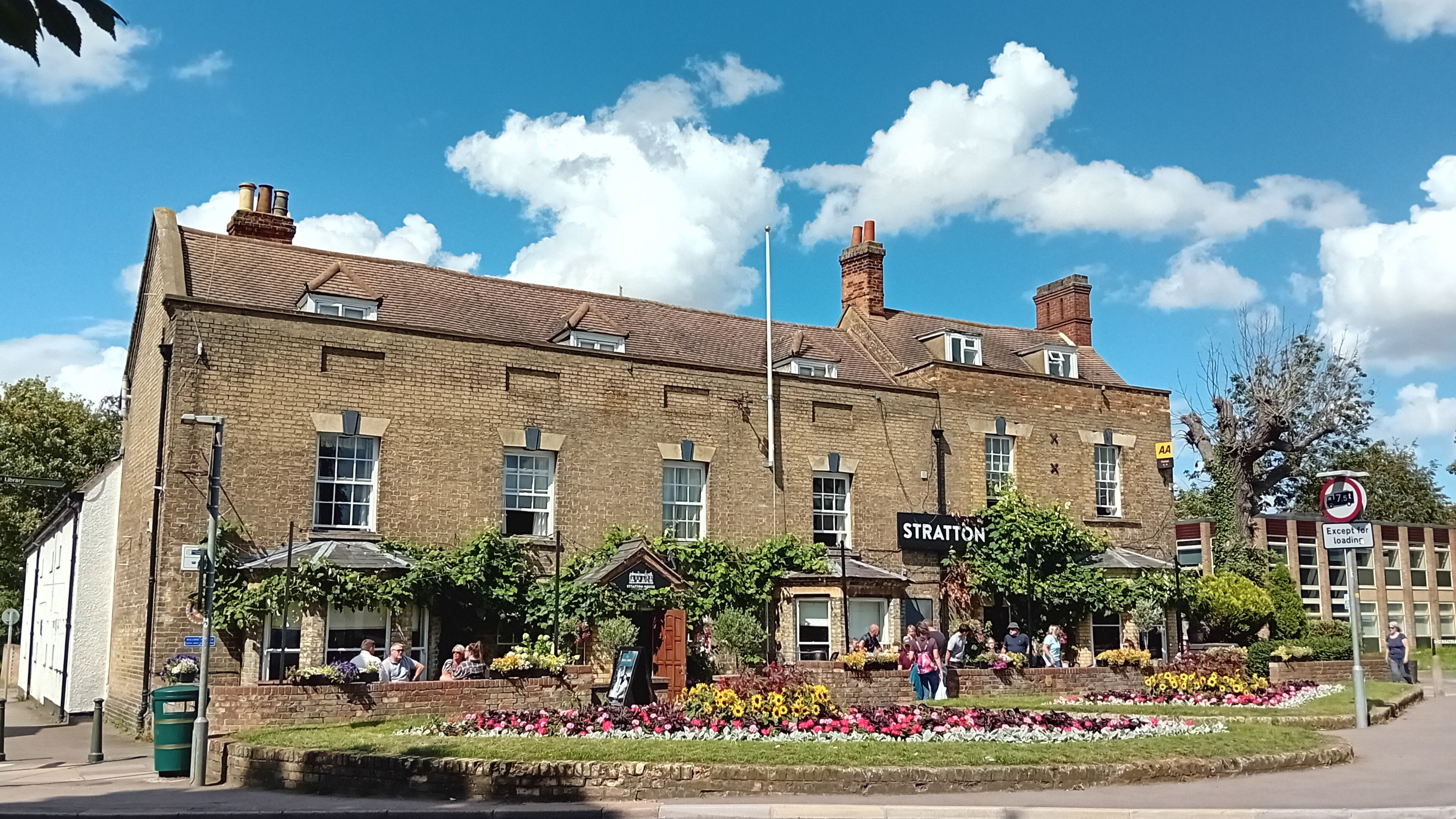
Stratton House, 1 The Baulk:
Offices and meeting place 1952–1974

== Abolition ==
Biggleswade Urban District was abolished in 1974 under the Local Government Act 1972, merging with other districts to form the new Mid Bedfordshire District. The area now forms part of Central Bedfordshire. A successor parish was created for the town, with its council taking the name Biggleswade Town Council. The new town council set up its offices at 1 Chestnut Avenue (one of the police houses behind Stratton House), being based there between 1977 and 2006. The Town Council then moved to the old Magistrates' Court building at 4 Saffron Road, which had closed as a court in 1999. In so doing, it moved to the building which had been its predecessor's meeting place over fifty years earlier.
