= Christine Chaundler =

English children's author

- Born: Christine Chaundler; 5 September 1887; Biggleswade, Bedfordshire, England
- Died: 15 December 1972 (aged 85); Fittleworth, Sussex
- Occupation: Writer
- Writing career
- Pen name: Peter Martin
- Language: English
- Period: 1912–1949
- Genre: Children's literature
- Notable works: Lancelot: The Adventures of King Arthur's Most Celebrated Knight; The Right St. John's; The Chivalrous Fifth; Bunty of the Blackbirds; The Madcap of the School

Christine Chaundler (5 September 1887 – 15 December 1972) was a prolific English children's author, who also wrote stories for boys as Peter Martin. Some of her hundreds of short stories were broadcast by the BBC.

== Life ==
Born in Biggleswade, Bedfordshire, the daughter of a solicitor, Henry Chaundler, and Constance Julia Chaundler (née Thompson), she was educated at Queen Anne's School, Caversham, until the age of sixteen, and then at St Winifred's School, Llanfairfechan.

Apart from a brief period in the Land Army during the First World War, Chaundler worked in editorial jobs as she built her writing career. By 1920, her earnings had allowed her to build a house on the Sussex Downs, where she lived until her death in 1972. She never married.

== Career ==
1n 1910, Chaundler adapted Sleeping Beauty as a children's play that was performed at the Biggleswade Town Hall. In 1912, she received 10s 6d, her first earnings, for a prize poem published in Girls' Realm, Chaundler's first earnings as a writer came in 1912, when she won 10s 6d in a Prize Poem competition run by Girls' Realm. From then on she made a growing income from writing girls' and boys' stories and books. She was a sub-editor for Little Folks from 1914 to 1917, before serving briefly in the Land Army. After the war, she edited juvenile books for James Nisbet and Company until 1922. During the 1930s, she reviewed children's books for The Quiver. She continued to write and became a prolific author of children's novels, for boys under her pseudonym "Peter Martin" and for girls under her own name. A census of young girls conducted by the Western Mail in 1927 ranked Chaundler sixth among popular authors. Although she was bested by Dickens, Shakespeare, and Kipling, she was listed above Alcott and Stevenson. She wrote hundreds of short stories for magazines and children's annuals, some of which were broadcast over the BBC's Children's Hour. However, the market for these types of children's books had changed by the late 1940s and Chaundler turned to reviewing books, reading books for publishers, and marketing her short stories to the BBC.

== Bibliography ==
- Lancelot: The Adventures of King Arthur's Most Celebrated Knight illustrated by Thomas Mackenzie and Eleanor Fortescue Brickdale (1995)
- Every Man's Book of Superstitions (1970)
- Everyman's Book of Ancient Customs (1968)
- A Year Book of Saints (1958)
- A Year Book of Legends (1954)
- Winkie Wee and the Silver Sixpences (1947)
- The Thirteenth Orphan (1947)
- The Odd Ones illustrated by Harry Rountree (1941)
- The Children's Author (1934)
- The Amateur Patrol illustrated by Jean Stuart (1933)
- Five B and Evangeline (1932)
- The Feud with the Sixth (1932)
- Jill of the Guides (1932)
- Two in Form Four (1931)
- The Story-Book School (1931)
- The Junior Prefect (1931)
- A Disgrace to the Fourth (1930)
- The Prize for Valour (1930)
- The Technical Fifth (1930)
- The Madcap of the School (1930)
- Friends in the Fourth illustrated by J. Dewar Mills (1929)
- My book of stories from the poets, told in prose (1927)
- Reforming the Fourth illustrated by J. Dewar Mills (1927)
- The Chivalrous Fifth illustrated by Anne Rochester (1927)
- A Credit to Her House A School Story for Girls illustrated by J. Dewar Mills (1926)
- Bunty of the Blackbirds (1925)
- Winning Her Colours (1924)
- Jill the Outsider illustrated by Elizabeth Earnshaw (1924)
- Dickie's Day (1924)
- Sally Sticks It Out: A Fourth Form Feud (1924)
- Jan of the Fourth (1923)
- Goblin Market ~ A Sensual Gothic Fantasy with Christina Rossetti, Constance Maud, Kent David Kelly (Editor) (2012)
- Blackie's Girls' Annual with Natalie Joan, Evelyn Smith, W. Kersley Holmes, Violet M. Methley (1929)
- Jan of the Fourth (1923)
- A Fourth Form Rebel illustrated by G. W. Goss (1922)
- The Fourth Form Detectives illustrated by G. W. Goss (1921)
- The Right St. John's (1920) Oxford University Press
- The Reputation of the Upper Fourth (Cara, #1) (1920)
- Arthur and his Knights illustrated by Thomas Mackenzie (1920)
- Just Gerry (1920)
- Pat's Third Term illustrated by Harold Earnshaw (1920)
- Ronald's Burglar illustrated by Helen Stratton (1919)
- Snuffles for Short illustrated by Honor Appleton (undated, c. 1921) (Nisbet & Co., London)
