= Wally Odell =

English footballer

Personal information
- Full name: Walter Reginald Odell
- Date of birth: 19 March 1912
- Place of birth: Biggleswade, England
- Date of death: 27 July 1971 (aged 59)
- Place of death: Bedford, England
- Height: 5 ft 7 in (1.70 m)
- Position: Left half

Senior career*
Years	Team	Apps	(Gls)
–	Sandy Albion		
1931	Biggleswade Town		
1931–1935	Hitchin Town		
1935–1937	Tottenham Hotspur	0	(0)
1935–1936	→ Northfleet United (loan)		
1937–1939	Wrexham	61	(0)
1939	Darlington (Note: Odell scored twice from three matches played in the 1939–40 Football League season before the outbreak of the Second World War forced the suspension of competitive football. These matches are not normally included in statistical sources, although Michael Joyce does count them in his Football League Players' Records.)	0	(0)
- * Club domestic league appearances and goals

Walter Reginald Odell (19 March 1912 – 27 July 1971) was an English footballer who played as a left half in the Football League for Wrexham. He was on the books of Tottenham Hotspur without playing League football for them, and his only appearances for Darlington were in the 1939–40 Football League season abandoned when war broke out. He played non-league football for Sandy Albion, Biggleswade Town, Hitchin Town and Northfleet United.

== Life and career ==
Odell was born in Biggleswade, Bedfordshire, and lived at nearby Upper Caldecote, where he attended the local Church of England school. As a young man he worked as a porter at Sandy railway station, played cricket for Caldecote Cricket Club and football for Sandy Albion and Biggleswade Town, before joining Spartan League club Hitchin Town during the 1931–32 season. He played at inside left and at centre forward before settling at left half. He was a member of the Hitchin team that won the Herts Senior Cup in 1934, and made 38 appearances in all competitions as Hitchin won the Spartan League title in 1934–35. He was also selected for the Hertfordshire County side that won the Southern Counties Amateur Championship.

Amid interest from other Football League clubs, including nearby Luton Town, for whose reserves he appeared, Odell signed for First Division club Tottenham Hotspur in June 1935. He was one of three members of the 1934–35 Hitchin side who went on to play in the Football League: the others were Cyril Walker and future England international Reg Smith. Odell never appeared in Tottenham's first team. He spent one season with their nursery club, Northfleet, and one with Tottenham's reserve team before being released on a free transfer. He then signed for Wrexham of the Third Division North, for whom he was a regular at left half in his first season, during which he made 40 league appearances. He appeared less frequently in the 1938–39 campaign, and was used at inside left and outside left as well as at left half. An ankle injury kept him out for several weeks towards the end of the season, during which he made 21 league appearances. He was not retained, and moved on to another Northern Section club, Darlington.

Odell scored twice in Darlington's three Northern Section matches before the Football League was suspended for the duration of the Second World War, and then returned to Bedfordshire. During the war he worked in a factory in Letchworth, and kept up his football with Biggleswade Town, occasional appearances for Darlington, and regular guest appearances for Clapton Orient, until a back injury put an end to his playing career.

When competitive football resumed after the war, Letchworth Town, a Hertfordshire County League club, appointed Odell as trainer-coach on the "strong recommendation" of Tottenham Hotspur. He remained in post until May 1950, when he resigned to concentrate on his business as licensee of a pub in nearby Ickleford. His wife Phyllis (née Bygrave), whom he married in 1937, had recently given birth to their second child. Odell returned to football on a part-time basis a year later as trainer-coach of one of his former clubs, Hitchin Town, then playing in the Athenian League. In November 1954, Odell and his wife took over the management of the Craufurd Arms pub in Wolverton, and remained there for more than ten years. After a brief spell running a grocery shop, they returned to the licensed trade at the Embankment Hotel in Bedford.

Odell died in Bedford in 1971 at the age of 59.
