= Ivel Valley School =

Coordinates: 52.088°N 0.257°W

Location
- Hitchmead Road; Biggleswade, Bedfordshire, SG18 0NL; England

Information
- Type: Community special school
- Established: 2010
- Local authority: Central Bedfordshire
- Department for Education URN: 109739 Tables
- Ofsted: Reports
- Principal: Joe Creswick
- Gender: Coeducational
- Age: 3 to 19
- Website: http://www.ivelvalley.beds.sch.uk/

Ivel Valley School is a coeducational special school, located in Biggleswade, Bedfordshire, England. The school accepts pupils from all over the Central Bedfordshire area, and was opened in September 2010 on the site of Sunnyside School.

== History ==
Sunnyside School and Hitchmead School were two separate schools for children with different levels of special educational needs. In June 2009, Central Bedfordshire Council launched a consultation on the future of special education provision in the district. The consultation included a proposal to merge the two schools. This was due to Sunnyside School having more pupils attending than the school buildings were designed for, while Hitchmead School had a falling roll call, which has fallen from 87 pupils to 51 in the previous five years.

In December 2009, Central Bedfordshire Council confirmed that a new combined special school would open on the current site of Sunnyside School in September 2010, with most pupils from Sunnyside and Hitchmead Schools transferring to the new school.

== The school today ==
The new school formally opened in September 2010 with the name of Ivel Valley School. Various modifications were made to the school site to accommodate the new range of pupils, while the old Hitchmead School site is still used for some educational activities by the school's pupils.

The school is currently for pupils between the ages of 3 and 19 years of age, whose special educational needs fall predominantly within the categories of Severe or Moderate Learning Difficulties. Some pupils may have additional medical, physical or sensory impairments or emotional and behavioural difficulties. All pupils attending the school will have an Education, Health and Care Plan (EHCP).

Following a reorganisation of the school, and additional classrooms being installed, in summer 2018 most pupils between 3 and 16 are now based on the Hitchmead Road site (the School site) and those between 16 and 19 are based at The Baulk (the College site). Some pupils are based in satellite classes at Biggleswade Academy.
