= Biggleswade Castle =

Castle in Bedfordshire, England

- Biggleswade, Bedfordshire, England

Site information
- Type: Ringwork and Bailey
- Condition: Earthworks

Location
- Shown within Bedfordshire
- Coordinates: 52°5′10.47″N 0°16′22.94″W

Site history
- Built: 12th century

Biggleswade Castle was a ringwork and bailey castle in the market town of Biggleswade in Bedfordshire, England.

The existence of this castle was discovered by aerial photography, in 1954. Some excavation of the site was done in 1962 and 1968. The excavations found evidence of timber structures, as well as pottery. The site was strategically positioned along a major road in the Ivel Valley, likely to regulate commerce and travel in and out of the area.

The site is composed of ringworks and baileys likely constructed in the 12th century. The main ringwork is made up of a central circular flat (30-35m in diameter) surrounded by two 6m ditches. Two baileys run to the west, each with a 10m surrounding ditch. A smaller ring ditch on the more southern Bailey is speculated to have been a funerary monument.

Only cropmarks and slight earthworks remain, as the land was altered by agricultural activity. This site is a Scheduled Monument, first listed in 1966.

== See also ==
- Stratton Park Moated Enclosure
- Castles in Great Britain and Ireland
- List of castles in England
