= Shortmead House =

Grade II listed English country house in the United kingdom

Coordinates: 52.0981°N 0.2653°W

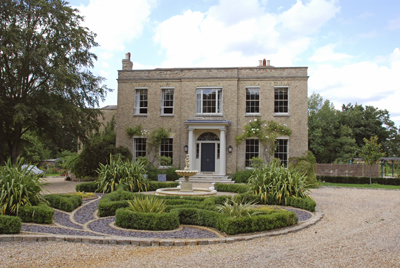
Shortmead House

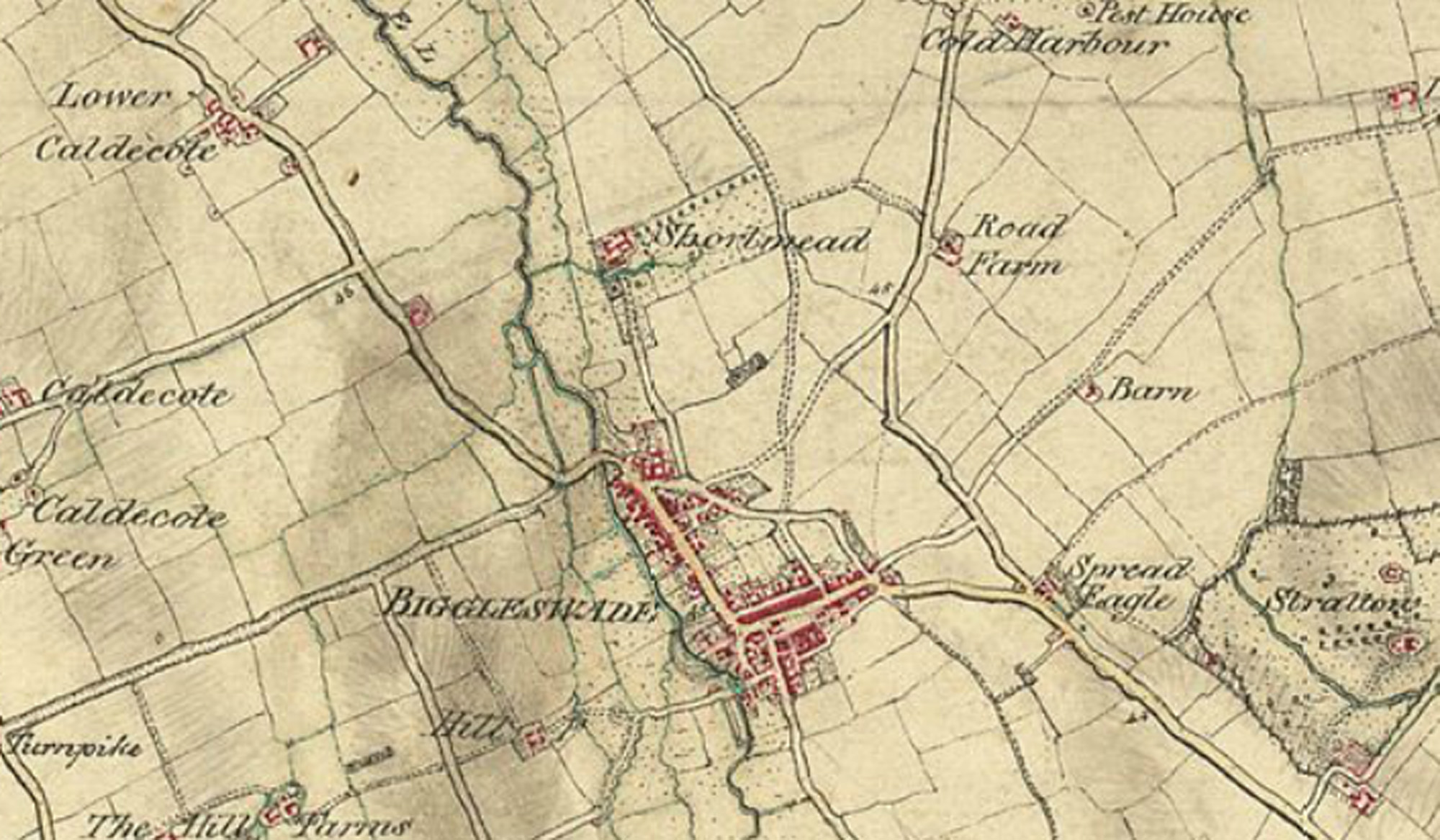
Map showing Shortmead Estate in 1804.

Shortmead House in Biggleswade, Bedfordshire, is a two-storey Georgian manor house, first mentioned in 1543. It is Grade II listed. It is lived in by the present owners as well as being used as business premises which are licensed as a wedding venue for civil ceremonies.

== History ==
There has been a house at Shortmead since the early 16th century with the first mention in 1543 when a Thomas Butcher, the owner of Shortmead Farm, gave money in his will to St Andrew's Church in Biggleswade. In the 1790s the house was remodelled into a Georgian manor house. In 1884 the house and estate, which covered 133 acres (54 ha) were auctioned in lots thereby reducing the total size. Today the estate covers only 24 acres (9.7 ha).

The estate was purchased by Ian Bond in 1999 with the house requiring major renovation both internally and externally to correct years of neglect. In 2002 Ian was joined by his wife Marilyn, who with the help of local volunteer groups like the British Trust for Conservation Volunteers systematically cleared, restored and developed the grounds into formal and informal gardens.

The estate is one of scientific interest, providing a safe haven for the Great Crested Newt, an endangered species in the United Kingdom, as well as the Wollemi Pine, a tree only discovered in 1994 in Australia.

== John and Elizabeth Bricheno ==
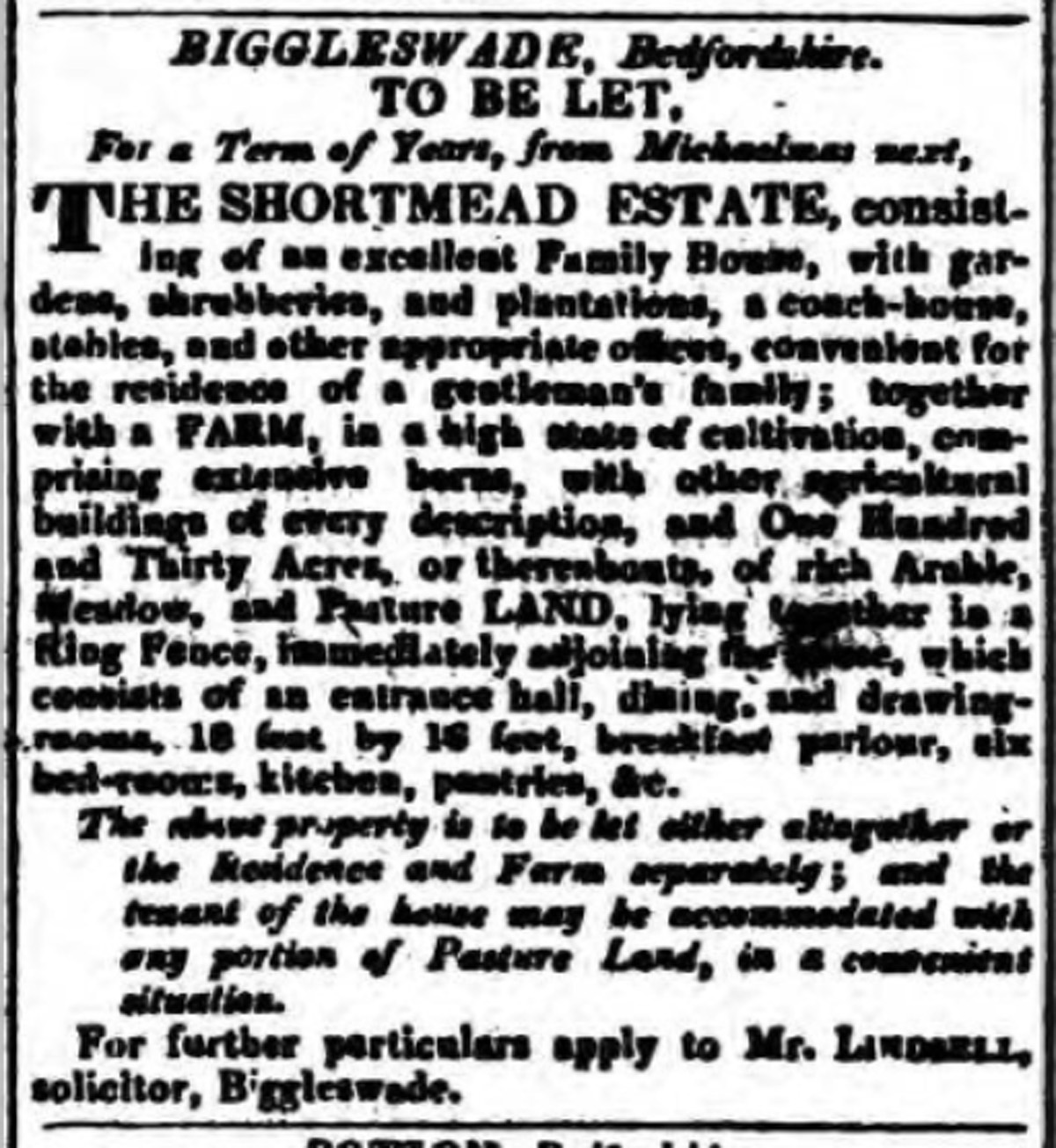
Rental Notice for Shortmead in 1830.

John Bricheno was one of the earliest residents of Shortmead House. He is noted in a social journal as being in residence in 1796. He is not mentioned in the 1791 Universal British Directory for Biggleswade so it is likely that he came to either build or buy Shortmead at this time. He is listed in some documents as being a “gentleman". and he owned a large number of properties in this area and other parts of England.

In 1796 he married Elizabeth Kent in St Leonards Church, Streatham, Surrey (see marriage certificate on the left). They lived at Shortmead for about 25 years and had several children. He sold Shortmead in about 1823 and moved to Bishopsgate. He died in 1838 and left a Will which outlines the many properties that he owned.

It appears that Robert Lindsell, who owned the nearby house of Fairfield, bought Shortmead after the Brichenos left but he rented it for many years. A rental advertisement in 1830 with a description of the house and surrounding land is shown on the right. Dr Abram Edward Gregory. was one of the tenants followed by William Wells Gardner who died there in 1859.

== Frances Lindsell ==
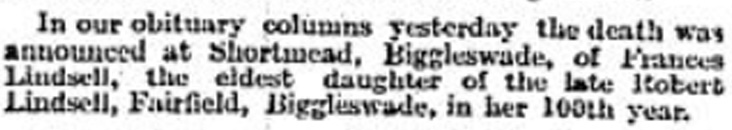
Obituary for Frances Lindsell in 1916.

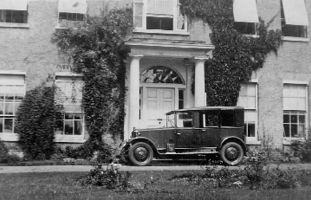
Shortmead House in 1939 at the time it was owned by Mrs Eva Ewbank-Morris

Robert Lindsell who was a solicitor and very wealthy land owner, died in 1856 and left Shortmead House to his eldest son Robert Henry Lindsell. He left an annuity to his wife and a substantial amount of money to his daughter Frances who never married. Frances and her mother moved to Shortmead House after it became vacant in 1859. Mrs Lindsell died in 1869 and Frances continued to live in the house until her death in 1916. She lived there until she was 100 years old. An obituary notice appeared in The Times which is shown on the left. The house during this time was inherited in 1891 by Henry Martin Linsell, the son of Robert Henry Lindsell. Upon his death in 1925 the house was sold.

The next long-term resident was Eva Frances Ewbank-Morris who lived there until about 1946. She was the daughter of Rev. Christopher Cooper Ewbank who lived in Biggleswade. In 1910 she had married William Richard Morris, an Irish surgeon who was 15 years her senior. They lived in Waterford, Ireland but unfortunately he died in 1921 leaving her a widow. She returned to Biggleswade some years after his death and bought Shortmead.
