= Reginald Ward =

English cricketer

Personal information
- Full name: Reginald Valentine Ward
- Born: 14 February 1902; Biggleswade, Bedfordshire, England
- Died: 1 May 1968 (aged 66); Yeovil, Somerset, England
- Batting: Right-handed

Domestic team information
- Years: Team
- 1931: Minor Counties
- 1929–1939: Bedfordshire

Career statistics
Competition	First-class
Matches	1
Runs scored	4
Batting average	4.00
100s/50s	–/–
Top score	4
Balls bowled	150
Wickets	2
Bowling average	38.50
5 wickets in innings	–
10 wickets in match	–
Best bowling	2/77
Catches/stumpings	–/–
- Source: Cricinfo, 23 May 2012

Reginald Valentine Ward (14 February 1902 – 1 May 1968) was an English cricketer. Ward was a right-handed batsman. He was born at Biggleswade, Bedfordshire.

Ward made his debut in county cricket for Bedfordshire against Oxfordshire at Bedford School in the 1929 Minor Counties Championship. He played minor counties cricket for Bedfordshire from 1929 to 1939, making a total of 48 appearances for the county, the last of which came against Cambridgeshire at Wardown Park, Luton. In 1931, he was selected to represent a combined Minor Counties cricket team in a first-class match against the touring New Zealanders at the Rose Brothers Ground, Gainsborough. Winning the toss and electing to bat first, the Minor Counties made 191 all out, with Ward the last man out, dismissed for 4 by Cyril Allcott. The New Zealanders then made 361/8 declared in their first-innings, during which Ward took the wickets of Lindsay Weir and Tom Lowry to finish with figures of 2/77 from 25 overs. The Minor Counties reached 115/3 in their second-innings, at which point the match was declared a draw.

He died at Yeovil, Somerset, on 1 May 1968.
