= Caffyns =

United Kingdom–based motor retailers

Caffyns plc
- Traded as: LSE: CFYN
- Founded: 1865
- Founder: William Morris Caffyn
- Headquarters: United Kingdom
- Products: Motor dealers
- Website: www.caffynsplc.co.uk

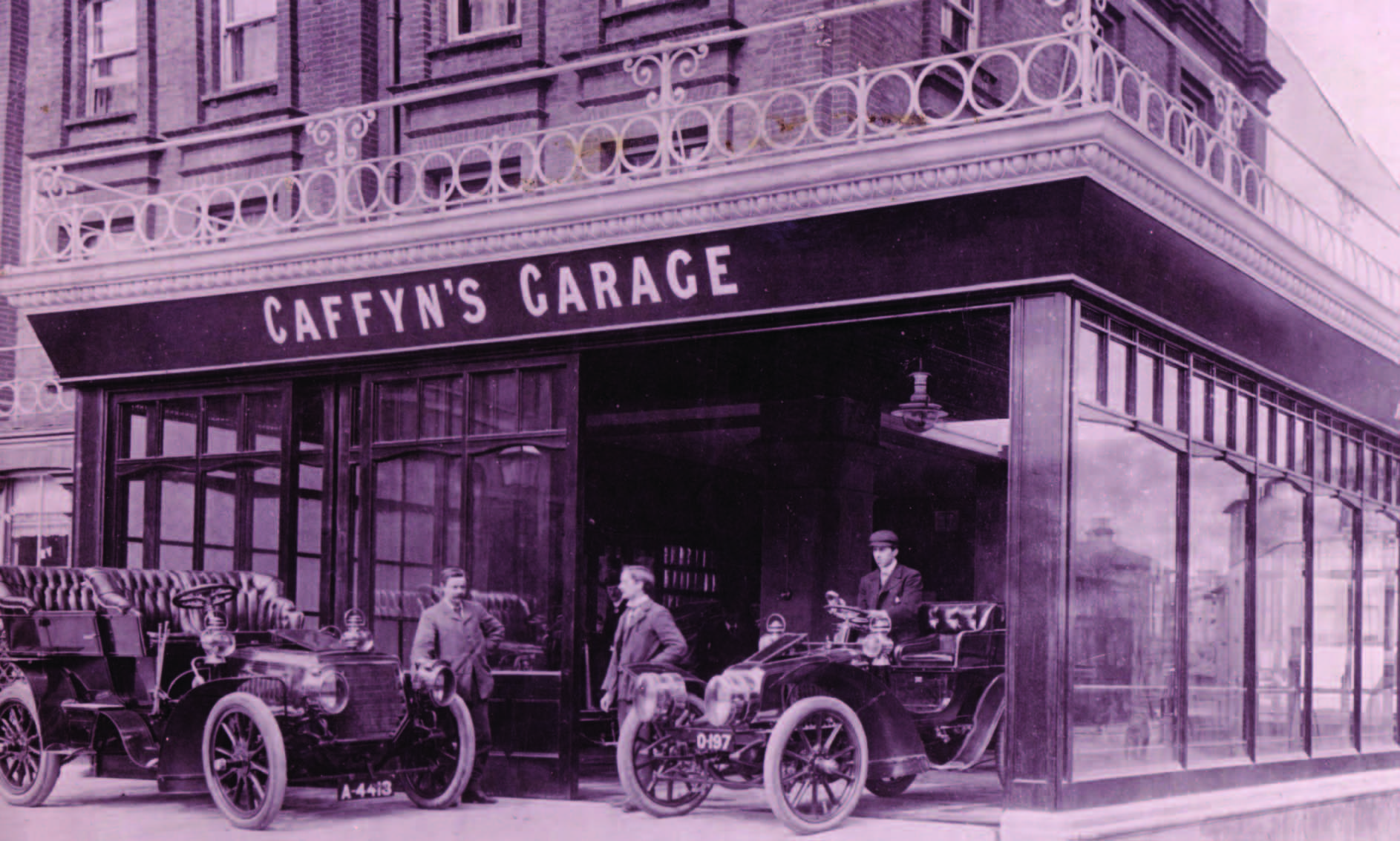
The first garage, at 12 The Colonnade, Eastbourne in 1904. Mr H.B. Caffyn is on the left, Mr P.T. Caffyn in the centre.

Caffyns plc are United Kingdom based motor retailers. The company is listed on the FTSE Fledgling Index of the London Stock Exchange under the ticker CFYN in the general retailers sector. Caffyns have dealerships in Ashford, Brighton, Eastbourne, Lewes, Tunbridge Wells and Worthing.

The firm was founded in 1865 by William Morris Caffyn as a "Gas and hot water fitter, Bell Hanger, Brass Finisher Tinman & Brazier", but by 1903 began to deal in motor cars. Members of the Caffyn family are still among the board of directors.

== History ==
Caffyn was founded in 1856 by William Morris Caffyn in Eastbourne, East Sussex. William Caffyn was a trained plumber and coppersmith. His company was initially licensed as a gas and water supplier. A little later, Caffyn also maintained a petroleum store, became an oil and lamp dealer and was also an electrician at the turn of the century. In 1903, the sons of the founder took over the business; the company has since traded as Caffyn Bros. At this time, the Caffyn brothers were expanding into the automotive sector. A repair shop for automobiles, which was temporarily called Caffyn's Garage, soon became an automobile dealership, with more than 100 vehicles in the showroom by 1906. Caffyn was a dealer for the Argyll, Belsize, Clement-Talbot, Siddeley and Wolseley brands. The company serviced automobiles, sold accessories, some of which it had developed itself, and offered driving lessons. In 1909 the company was converted into a corporation; it now traded as Caffyns Garages Ltd.

After the end of the First World War, during which Caffyn manufactured armaments, the company began producing automobile bodies. Caffyn's activity was not limited to one or a few chassis manufacturers; Rather, the company dressed up any chassis “like a typical coachbuilder from the province”, according to the customer’s wishes. These included Lancias, Darracqs, Wolseleys and Sunbeams; occasionally, Caffyn also manufactured bodies for Rolls-Royce.

The company grew steadily in the 1930s. In 1929 Caffyn sold more than 1000 vehicles. Body construction was also expanded. In order to increase its own capacities, Caffyn took over the rival companies Rock, Thorpe & Watson and Maltby. Immediately before the outbreak of war, Caffyn employed 450 people and had an annual turnover of £610,000.

During the Second World War, large parts of the production facilities were damaged or destroyed. After the end of the war, the production of vehicle bodies was not resumed; only individual chassis were re-bodied or revised at the customer's request. The company focused on the sale of passenger cars and commercial vehicles. In the 1960s and 1970s, Caffyns sold the brands of the British Leyland Motor Corporation, but was also a Rolls-Royce dealer for a time. In the 21st century, Caffyn is a dealer of the Volkswagen Group and also sells Vauxhall, Volvo and Land Rover.
