= Old Town Hall, Biggleswade =

Municipal building in Biggleswade, Bedfordshire, England

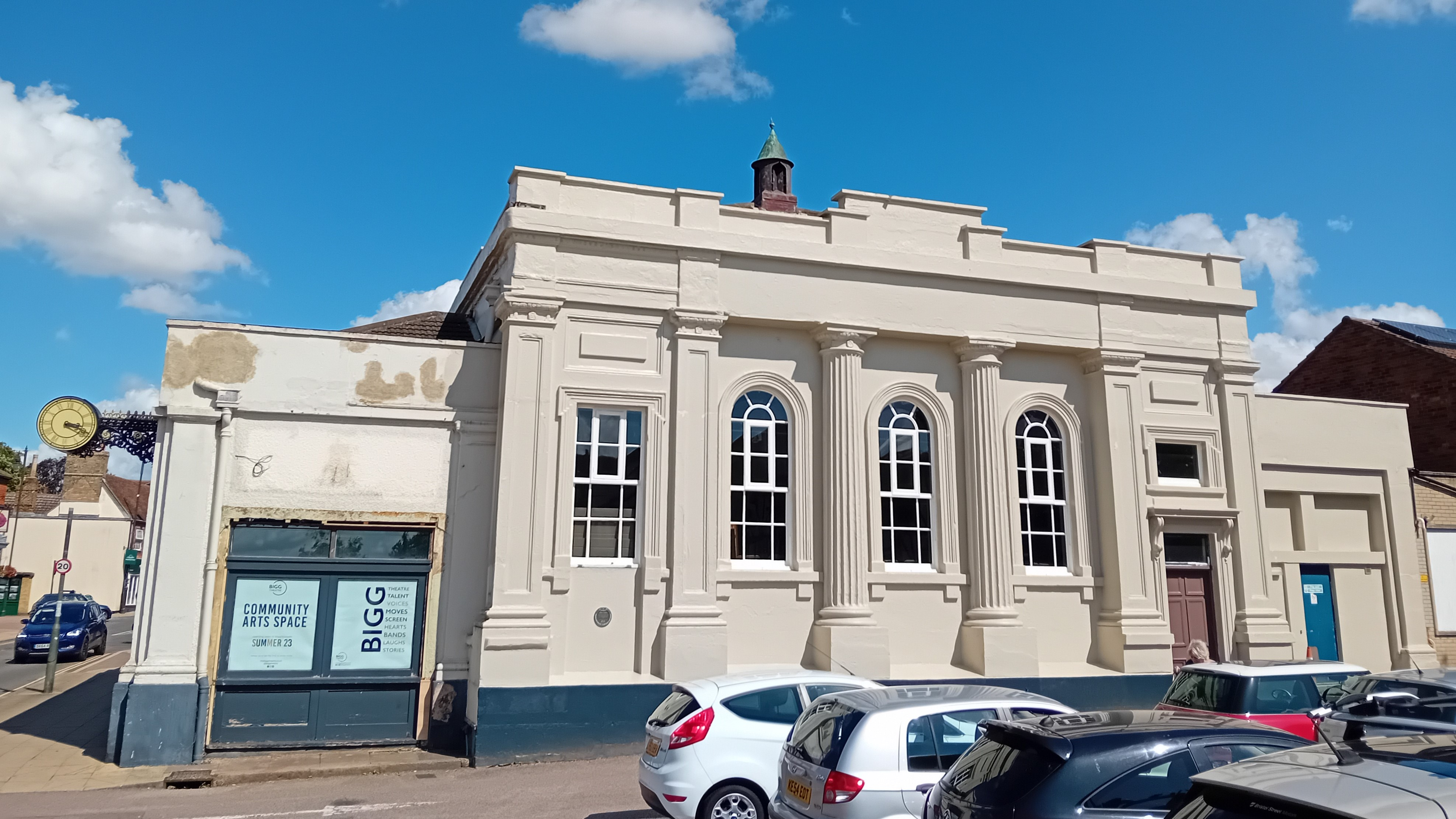
- Old Town Hall, Biggleswade

- Shown in Bedfordshire
- 52.0867°N 0.2626°W
- Location: High Street, Biggleswade

History
- Built: 1844

Site notes
- Architect: James Tacy Wing
- Architectural style: Neoclassical style

Listed Building – Grade II
- Official name: 36, High Street
- Designated: 7 December 1978
- Reference no.: 1321421

The Old Town Hall is a former municipal building in the High Street, Biggleswade, Bedfordshire, England. The structure, which most recently operated as a restaurant, is a Grade II listed building.

== History ==
The site, on the east side of the Market Square, was previously occupied by the garden of the Old Vicarage. The first town hall in the site, described as "a rather unattractive stone building", was completed in 1814. By the 1840s, the earlier building had become dilapidated and civic leaders decided to replace it with a new structure. The new building was designed by James Tacy Wing of Bedford in the neoclassical style, built by William Twelvetrees of Biggleswade in brick with a stucco finish at a cost of £800 and was completed in 1844.

The design involved a near symmetrical main frontage of five bays facing onto the Market Square. The central section was fenestrated by three round headed casement windows with architraves, while the left hand bay contained a square headed window with an architrave with a panel above, and the right hand bay contained a doorway with a rectangular window and a panel above. The central bay was flanked by fluted Doric order columns, while the other bays were flanked by Doric order pilasters supporting an entablature, a cornice and a parapet. The building was surmounted by a central roof lantern.

In the 1880s, a group of local businessmen, decided to form a company, to be known as the Biggleswade Town Hall Company, to acquire and expand the building. Low-level extensions were erected at both ends of the building at a cost of £900 and completed in 1888. Following significant population growth, largely associated with the status of Biggleswade as a market town, the area became a local government district under a local board of health in 1892 and became an urban district in 1894. The new urban district council rented rooms in the town hall for its meetings. A projecting clock, made by Richard Cawse of Biggleswade, was installed on the north wall in 1898. The building also served as a public events venue and the entertainer, Albert Chevalier, regularly performed there in the late 19th century and early 20th century.

After the Biggleswade Town Hall Company got into financial difficulties, it was wound up in 1924. The council moved its meetings to the Masonic Rooms (also known as St Andrew's Rooms) on St Andrew's Street in October 1926, and the local magistrates' court hearings, which had also been held in town hall, moved to a new courthouse in Saffron Road in October 1927. The old town hall was used a petrol filling station from 1927, as a dance hall from 1935 and as an electrical store, operated by Horace Gale, from 1939.

Following an extensive programme of refurbishment works the building re-opened as an ASK Italian restaurant in December 2002. It was re-branded as PizzaExpress a few years later, but closed in 2020. A programme of works, to convert the building into a performing arts venue known as The Bigg Theatre, was initiated in June 2023.
